= Malmö Stadion =

Multi-purpose stadium in Malmö, Sweden

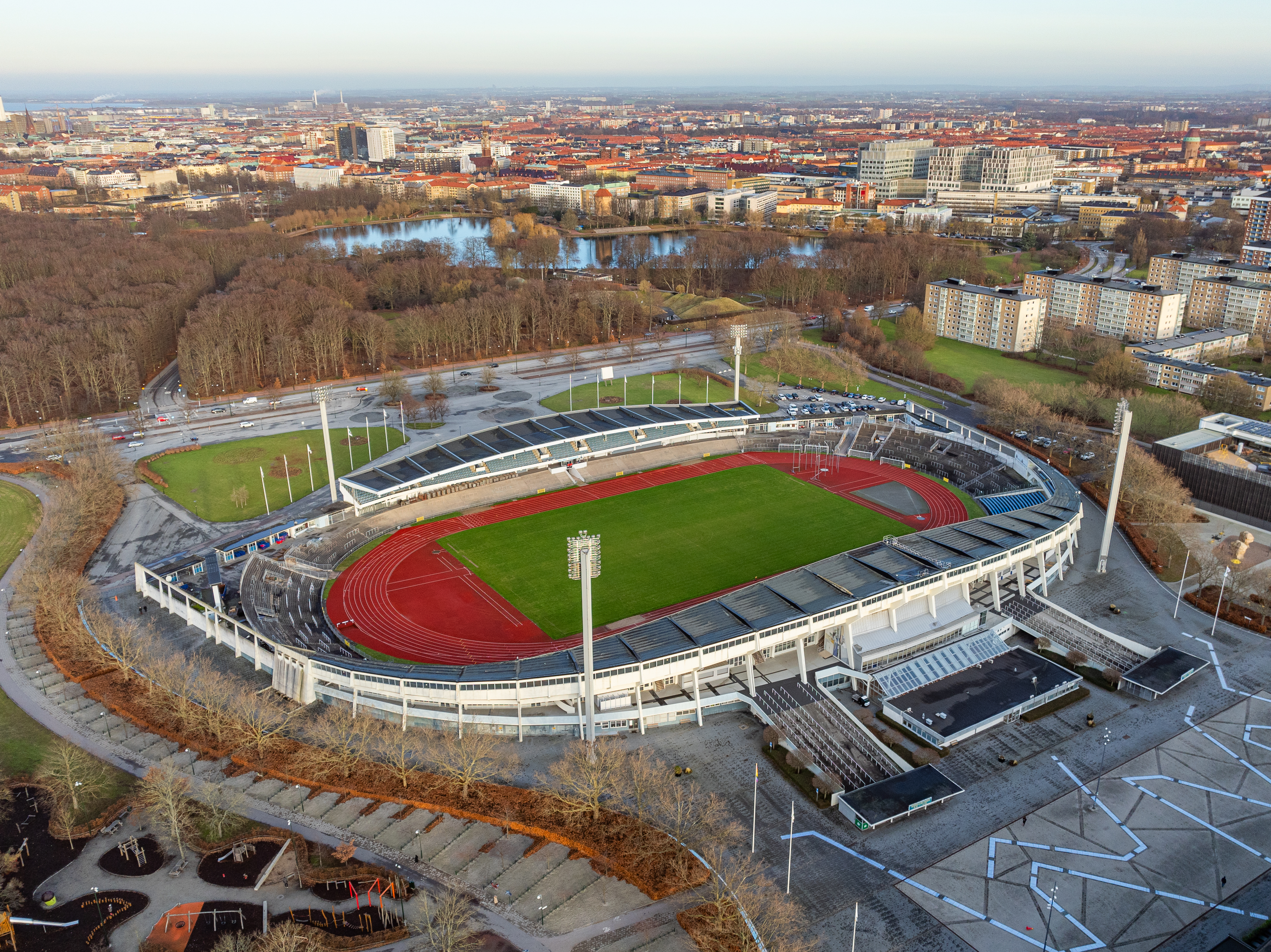
- 2023 aerial view
- Interactive map of Malmö Stadion
- Location: Eric Perssons väg 31, 217 62 Malmö
- Coordinates: 55°35′10″N 12°59′21″E
- Owner: Malmö Stad
- Operator: Malmö Stad
- Capacity: 26,500, of whom 14,000 were seated
- Surface: Grass
- Scoreboard: Yes
- Field size: 100 by 65 metres (328 ft × 213 ft)

Construction
- Groundbreaking: 5 June 1956
- Built: 1956–1958
- Opened: 28 May 1958
- Expanded: 1992
- Closed: November 2025
- Demolished: June 2026
- Architects: Fritz Jaenecke; Sten Samuelson
- Structural engineer: Skånska Cementgjuteriet
- Main contractor: Skånska Cementgjuteriet

Tenants
- IFK Malmö (1958–1999) (2009–2025); MAI (1958–2025); Malmö FF (1958–2008); Malmö FF Dam (1970–2005); KSF Prespa Birlik (2016)

Malmö Stadion, often known simply as Stadion before the construction of the new Stadion between 2007 and 2009, is a defunct multi-purpose stadium in Malmö, Sweden. The stadium served as the home ground for Malmö FF, an association football team in Sweden's top flight, Allsvenskan, from its opening in 1958 until 2009, when the club moved to the newly constructed Stadion, built beside Malmö Stadion, in 2009. Malmö FF continued to use the stadium for training purposes and youth matches between 2009 and 2025. It was also used by association football club IFK Malmö, presently of Division 2, and athletics club MAI. Besides being used for sports, the stadium also hosted various concerts and other events. The ground's record attendance, 30,953, was set in the first match played at the ground, a 1958 FIFA World Cup match between Argentina and West Germany.

Malmö Stadion was originally built for the 1958 FIFA World Cup, during which it hosted four matches. It replaced Malmö IP as Malmö's main sports stadium, where IFK Malmö, MAI and Malmö FF had been based since the early 20th century. It also hosted three matches during the 1992 UEFA European Football Championship. The stadium held 26,500 spectators when in its sporting configuration, with 14,000 fans seated and 12,500 standing. For concerts, the ground held up to 40,000 people depending on the location of the stage. On 2 February 2015 Malmö Stad decided to approve the demolition of the stadium for redevelopment of the area. Malmö Stad has previously decided that a new public swimming arena is to be built on the site in the near future. Demolition of the stadium started in November 2025 and finished in June 2026.

== History ==
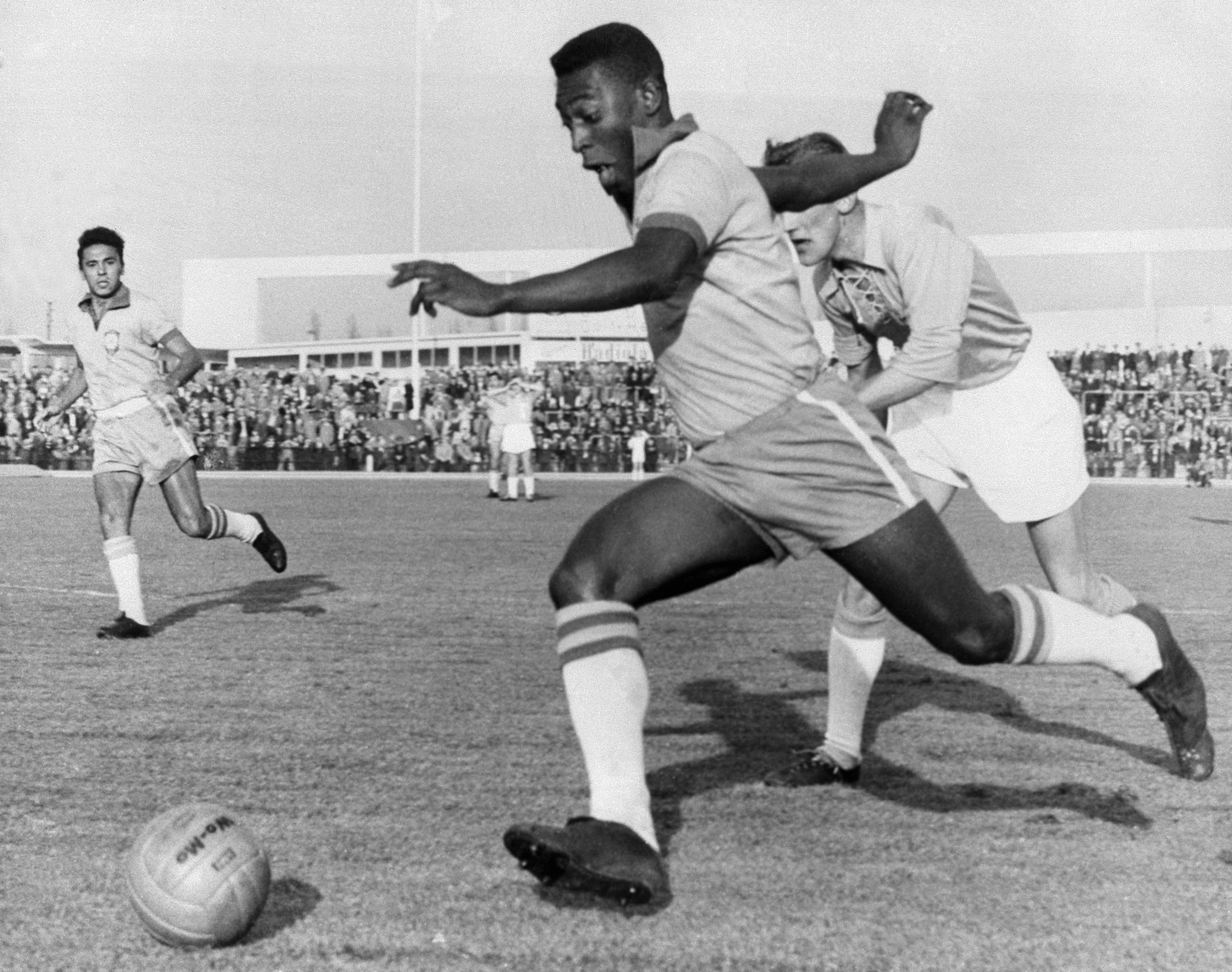
Pelé playing for Brazil at Malmö Stadion in an exhibition match against Malmö FF in 1960

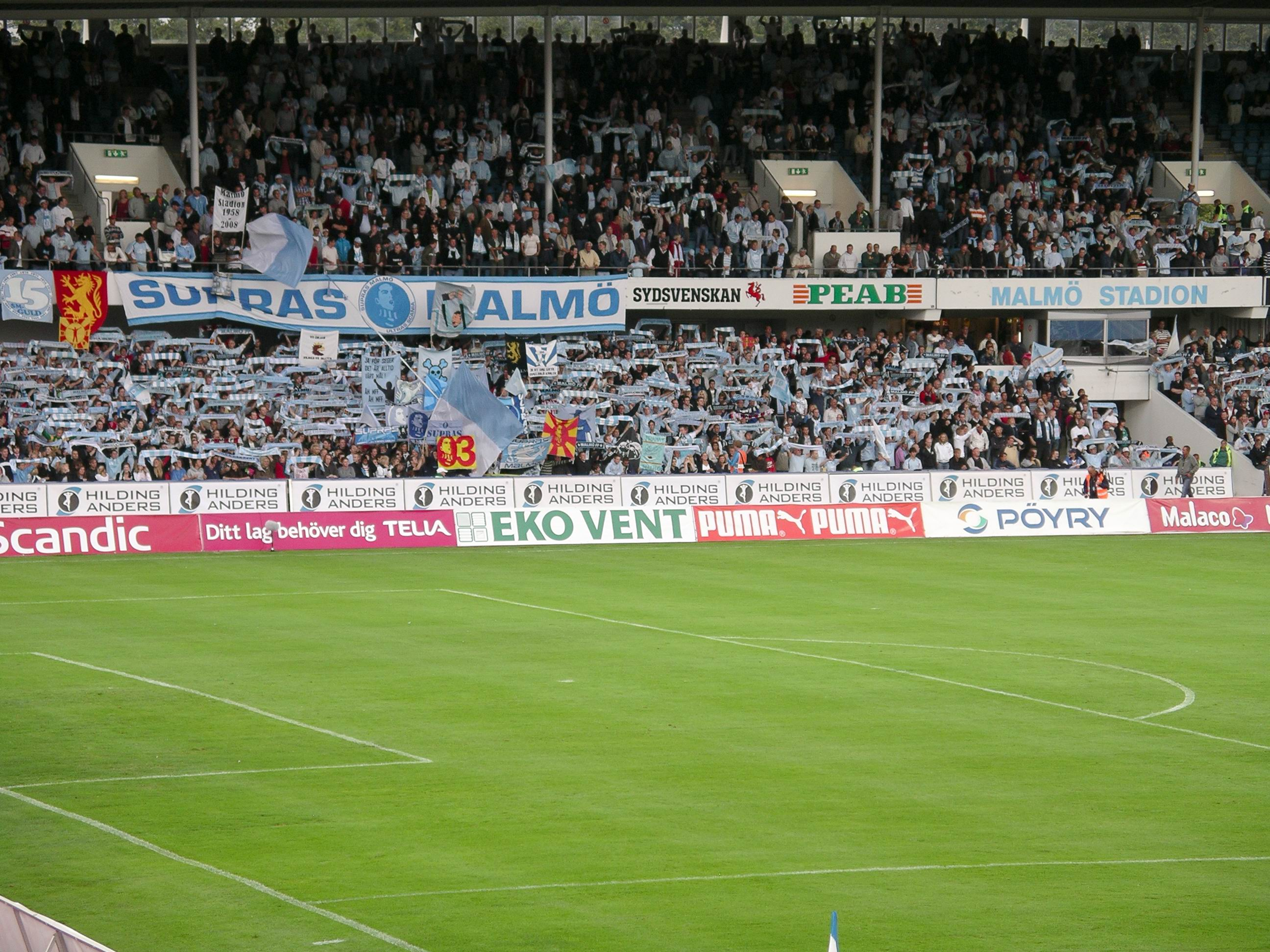
Malmö FF supporters in an Allsvenskan match against Hammarby IF in 2008

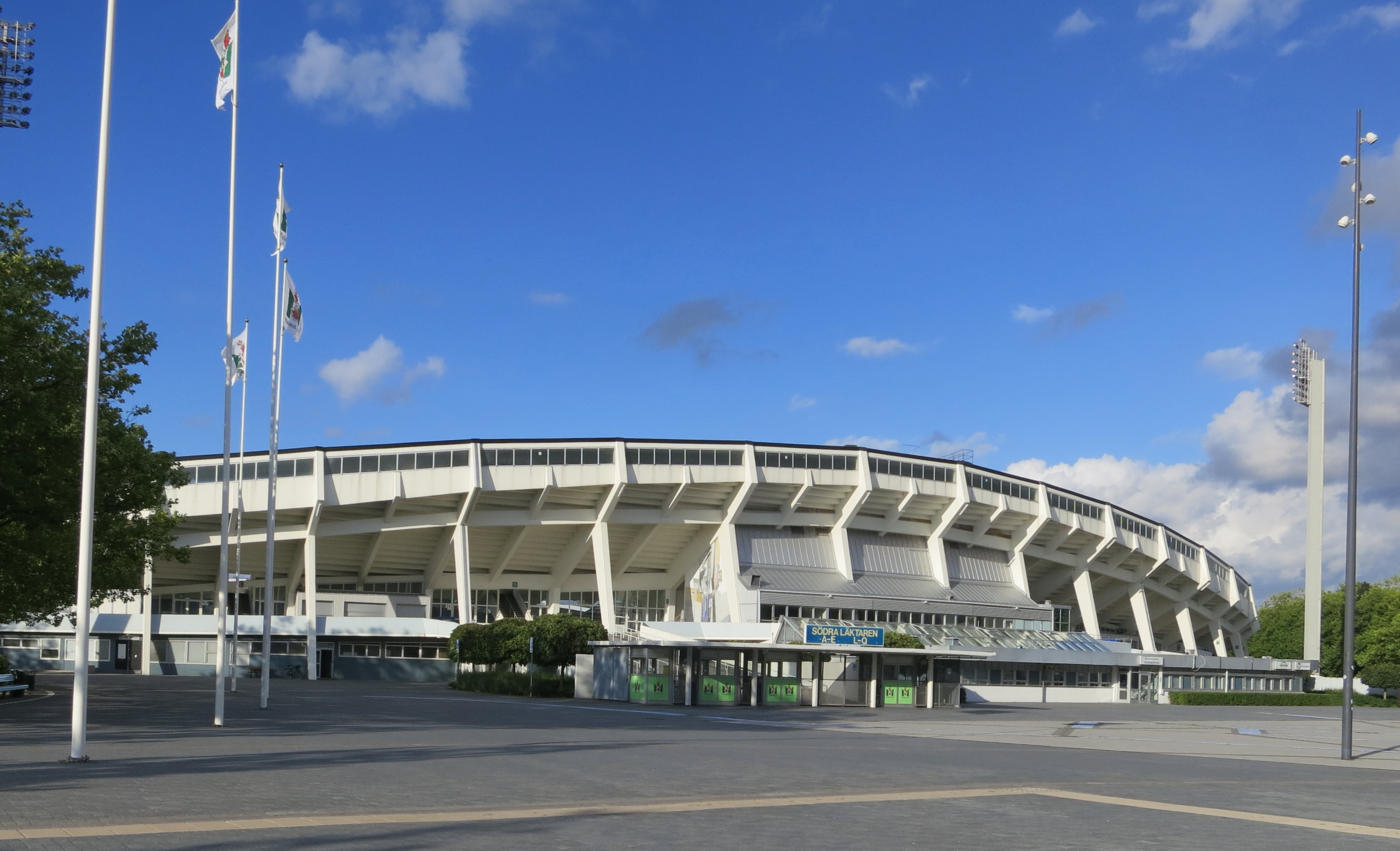
The exterior of the Southern Stand of Malmö Stadion in 2014

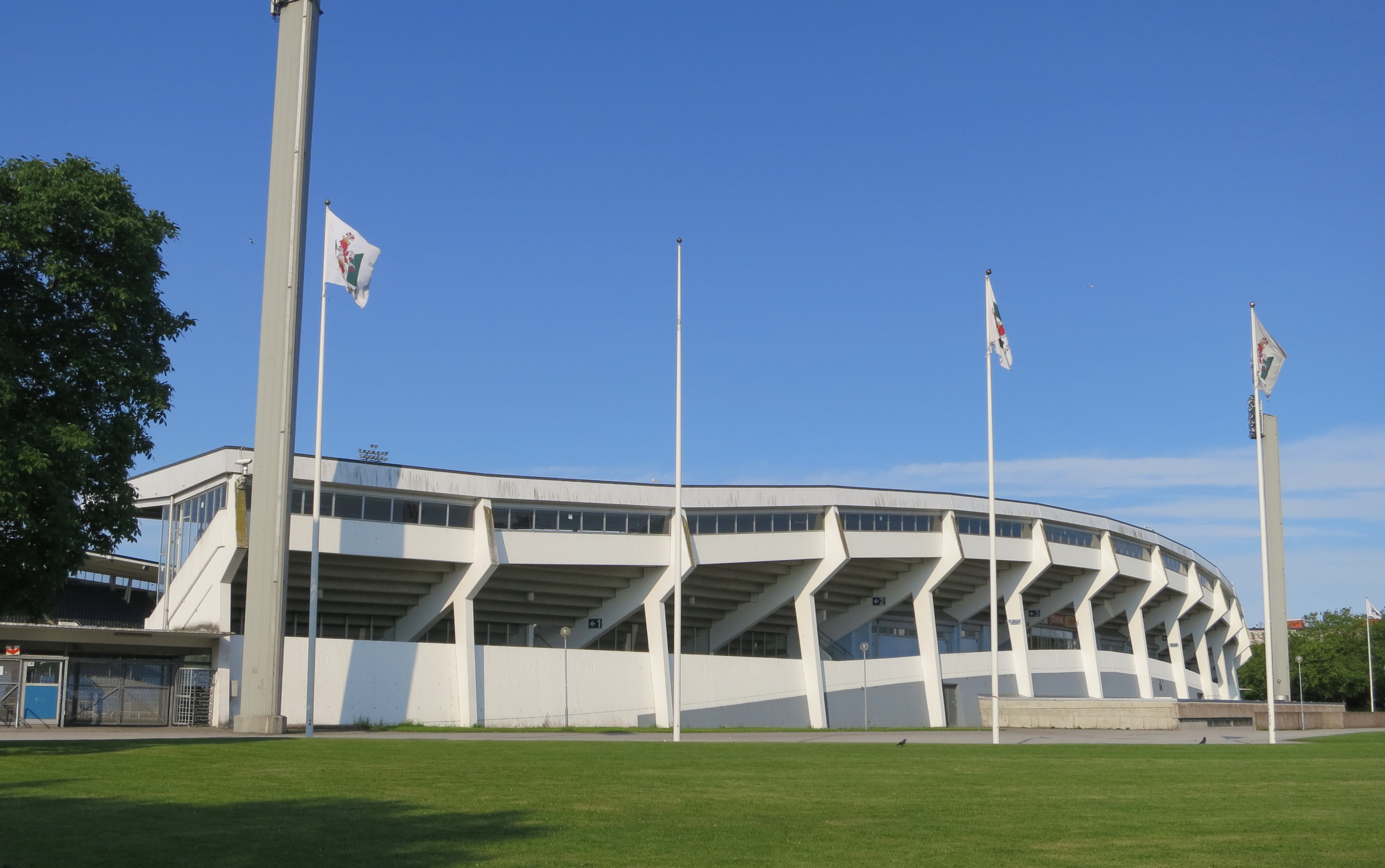
The exterior of the Northern Stand of Malmö Stadion in 2013

Plans to build a new stadium in Malmö originated in 1943, when local officials deemed Malmö IP to be too small for major events. However, the city council could not agree where to build the new stadium, and the matter was dropped for the time being. It was not until Sweden was chosen to host the 1958 FIFA World Cup that the question resurfaced. The location of the stadium was a main subject of discussion: some suggested a suburban location in Jägersro, while others thought that the stadium should be located in central Malmö, near the neighbourhood of Pildammsparken. Proponents of a central location ultimately won the day; the site was confirmed in 1954.

The plans were agreed upon in 1956, and building started on 5 June that year, when the chairman of the city's sports committee turned the first sod. The ground officially opened about two years later, on 28 May 1958. At the time of the stadium's inauguration, it held 31,000 spectators. It was designed by architects Sten Samuelsson and Fritz Jaenecke, who also designed another of the World Cup stadiums, Ullevi in the city of Gothenburg; as a result, the two grounds share many architectural features. During the World Cup, the stadium hosted four matches: West Germany vs Argentina in Group 1, which was the inaugural match of the stadium; West Germany vs Northern Ireland, also in Group 1; Northern Ireland vs Czechoslovakia, in the Group 1 play-off; and, finally, West Germany vs Yugoslavia in the quarter-final round.

During the 1992 UEFA European Football Championship (commonly called Euro 1992), Malmö Stadion hosted three matches in Group 1, which comprised the national teams of Sweden, Denmark, England and France. None of the matches played in Malmö involved Sweden, however, as the host nation played all of their matches at Råsunda, a stadium in the capital city Stockholm.

Malmö Allmänna Idrottsförening (MAI), the largest athletics club in Malmö, have used the stadium for training purposes and outdoor competition since the stadium's inauguration in 1958. MAI organises its own international athletic competition, the MAI Gala, which has been held since the 1930s. It was originally hosted at Malmö IP, but moved to Malmö Stadion after its construction. Some notable athletes who have competed in the gala are Marion Jones, Maurice Greene, Sergej Bubka and Kajsa Bergqvist.

Malmö Stadion served as the home ground of association football club Malmö FF between 1958 and 2008. The team moved to the stadium on its opening in 1958, leaving its original home ground at Malmö IP to do so. The first Malmö FF match at the new ground was played on 8 August 1958; in an Allsvenskan fixture, Malmö FF took on their cross-town rivals, IFK Malmö, who had also moved to the stadium from Malmö IP. Played in front of 17,368 fans, the game ended with a 4–4 draw. IFK were relegated from Allsvenskan in 1962, and have not returned to the first tier since, but the club continues to play at Malmö Stadion nonetheless. Malmö FF experienced an average attendance of around 13,000 for the first ten years at the stadium; average crowds then dropped to below 10,000 by the end of the 1970s. By the 1990s, attendances were at an all-time low, with less than 5,000 people on average coming to Malmö FF matches. The club therefore let Malmö Stadion for the newly renovated Malmö IP in 1999, IFK Malmö followed in August the same year. By this time IFK Malmö were playing in Division 2, then the third tier in the Swedish league system. During their seasons in Allsvenskan, IFK Malmö had attracted an average attendance of around 10,000 spectators between 1957–58 and 1962. IFK Malmö's attendance at Malmö Stadion reached its peak during the 1960 season when the club finished as runners-up in Allsvenskan and attracted 12,787 spectators on average to the stadium. The attendance had decreased to around 1,000 spectators per match in 1999 when the club had dropped in the league.

Malmö FF's move to Malmö IP occurred during the second half of the 1999 Allsvenskan. It soon became apparent to the club that Malmö IP was too small, and lacked the safety facilities that Malmö Stadion offered. When Malmö FF were relegated to the second tier of Swedish football at the end of the 1999 season, the club board decided to move the team back to Malmö Stadion before the next season started. IFK Malmö, however stayed at Malmö IP. After Malmö FF were promoted back to Allsvenskan after one season in the second division, Superettan, the average attendance began to rise. Malmö FF's average crowd during the 2001 Allsvenskan season was 11,315; it was the first time since the 1970s that the club had drawn an average crowd of more than 10,000 spectators. Average attendances then increased year on year as Malmö FF experienced a successful period. In the 2004 Allsvenskan season, as Malmö FF won their first Swedish championship since 1988, the team also set a new club record for attendances over a season, with an average of 20,061 spectators watching Malmö FF matches. Around this time, both club and fans began to feel that Malmö Stadion had served it purpose, as the ageing stadium began to deteriorate. Some fans also expressed their discontent with the distance between the pitch and the stands, necessitated by the running tracks surrounding the playing area.

Malmö Stad, the city council, announced on 25 April 2005 its intention to either help the club renovate Malmö Stadion, or build a new stadium in the same area. Four days later, five different scenarios were laid out by the municipality: the first proposed the construction of an entirely new, football-specific stadium to the south of Malmö Stadion, while the second suggested the demolition of Malmö Stadion, and the erection of a new ground for football and athletics on the same site. The third, fourth, and fifth ideas all proposed the building of two stadiums, one for football and one for athletics, on various local plots. The municipality chose the first option on 3 December 2005: the new football ground would be built south of Malmö Stadion, with a capacity of 20,000 to 25,000, on a 399 million kronor budget. Malmö Stadion, meanwhile, would be renovated into an athletics stadium for 50 million kronor. Stadion was completed in 2009. As of 2012, no renovation has been done on Malmö Stadion.

Malmö FF left Malmö Stadion at the end of the 2008 Allsvenskan season. The last Allsvenskan match played at the stadium was the team's final game of the season, against GIF Sundsvall on 9 November 2008. The match was won 6–0 by Malmö FF, who wore a special kit designed to honour the legacy of the stadium. Malmö FF still uses the stadium for training purposes and youth matches. IFK Malmö returned to Malmö Stadion for the 2009 season. The move was done in protest against Malmö Stad's decision to lay out an artificial turf at Malmö IP. Since returning to Malmö Stadion, IFK Malmö's average attendance has been around 100–200 spectators per match. The team currently plays in Division 4, the sixth tier of Swedish football.

In June 2011, Malmö Stad decided that a new public swimming arena is to be built in the same area as the stadium in the near future. This leaves the stadium's future clouded in uncertainty. Recent occurrences have indicated that Malmö Stadion might continue to be used as an athletics arena, as MAI intends to revive the MAI Gala. In November 2012, MAI lobbied to attract 100 metres Olympic champion Usain Bolt to the stadium for the proposed MAI Gala in August 2014. MAI are also working towards hosting the European Athletics Junior Championships in 2015, and have written to the European Athletic Association to express their interest. On 31 January 2015 new reports suggested that the city council had reached an agreement that Malmö Stadion is to be demolished. The decision to approve the demolition of the stadium was taken on 2 February 2015. As of February 2015 it is still unknown when the demolition process will start and what will become of the area.

== Structure and facilities ==
Malmö Stadion had an overall capacity of 26,500 spectators for sports, of which 14,000 were sitting spectators. When hosting concerts, the stadium could host 25,000 spectators when the stage was on either long side of the stadium, or up to 40,000 when it was placed in front of either short side. It comprised two main stands on each of the long sides of the pitch: the Southern Stand and the Northern Stand, both of which had two tiers. The lower tier of the Northern Stand was terraced, and was the only tier of the stand until the upper, seated tier was built in 1992. The short sides of the pitch featured two minor terracing sections, respectively named the Eastern Stand and the Western Stand. When Malmö FF were based at the ground, the Northern Stand terracing was the section with the most season ticket holders, while the Eastern Stand was the section used to house away fans.

The stadium featured a 100 by 65 metres (328 ft × 213 ft) association football pitch, and eight all-weather running tracks, which surrounded the pitch. The tracks were certified for national and international athletic competitions. Also available at the stadium were areas on each short side of the pitch for the high jump, javelin throw, pole vault and shot put events. In front of the Southern Stand there were pits for long jump and triple jump. When the stadium was used for association football, two dugouts were placed at the edge of the pitch in front of the Southern Stand. Behind the two dugouts, on the other side of the running tracks, was the entrance and exit to the players' changing rooms, which were located in the Southern Stand. There were a total of 12 changing rooms inside the stand, as well as facilities for referees and media. There were reserved seats for officials and media in the Southern Stand. In the respective corridors behind the Southern and Northern Stands, as well as in the open area between the Northern and Western Stands, there were several vendors selling snacks, light meals, and beverages. The entrances to the stadium were located along the Southern and Northern Stands. A ticket office, formerly used for selling the tickets for Malmö FF home matches, was connected with the Southern Stand.

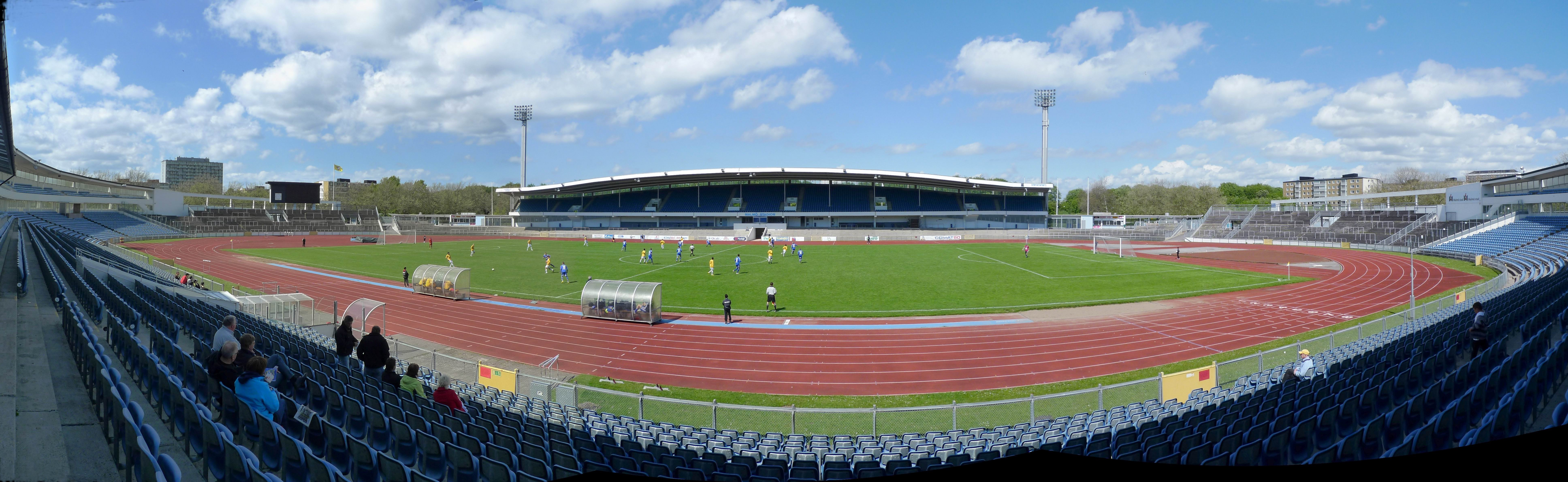
A panorama of Malmö Stadion from the Southern Stand, showing, from left to right, the Western Stand, the Northern Stand and the Eastern Stand

== International football ==
=== 1958 FIFA World Cup ===
The following 1958 FIFA World Cup matches were held at Malmö Stadion:

8 June 1958 Group 1	West Germany	3–1	Argentina	Malmö
19:00 (CET)	Rahn 32', 79'; Seeler 42'	Report	Corbatta 3'	Stadium: Malmö Stadion; Attendance: 31,156; Referee: Reginald Leafe (England)

15 June 1958 Group 1	West Germany	2–2	Northern Ireland	Malmö
19:00 (CET)	Rahn 20'; Seeler 78'	Report	McParland 18', 60'	Stadium: Malmö Stadion; Attendance: 21,990; Referee: Joaquim Fernandes Campos (Portugal)

17 June 1958 Group 1 Play-offs	Northern Ireland	2–1 (a.e.t.)	Czechoslovakia	Malmö
19:00 (CET)	McParland 44', 97'	Report	Zikán 18'	Stadium: Malmö Stadion; Attendance: 6,196; Referee: Maurice Guigue (France)

19 June 1958 Quarter-finals	West Germany	1–0	Yugoslavia	Malmö
19:00 (CET)	Rahn 12'	Report		Stadium: Malmö Stadion; Attendance: 20,000; Referee: Raymon Wyssling (Switzerland)

=== UEFA Euro 1992 ===
The following UEFA Euro 1992 matches were held at Malmö Stadion:

11 June 1992 Group 1	Denmark	0–0	England	Malmö
20:15		Report		Stadium: Malmö Stadion; Attendance: 26,385; Referee: John Blankenstein (Netherlands)

14 June 1992 Group 1	France	0–0	England	Malmö
17:15		Report		Stadium: Malmö Stadion; Attendance: 26,535; Referee: Sándor Puhl (Hungary)

17 June 1992 Group 1	France	1–2	Denmark	Malmö
20:15	Papin 60'	Report	Larsen 8'; Elstrup 78'	Stadium: Malmö Stadion; Attendance: 25,673; Referee: Hubert Forstinger (Austria)

=== Sweden matches ===
The stadium also hosted several matches played by the Sweden national team. This is a list of all competitive matches played by Sweden at Malmö Stadion:

2 August 1959 Nordic Championship	Sweden	3–1	Finland	Malmö
		Report		Stadium: Malmö Stadion; Attendance: 19,555; Referee: Carl Frederik Jörgensen (Denmark)

4 November 1962 UEFA Euro qualification	Sweden	1–1	Norway	Malmö
	Eriksson 49'	Report	Krogh 60'	Stadium: Malmö Stadion; Attendance: 8,726; Referee: Werner Bergmann (West Germany)

18 September 1963 UEFA Euro qualification	Sweden	3–2	Yugoslavia	Malmö
	Persson 30', 60'; Bild 72'	Report	Zambata 21'; Galić 64'	Stadium: Malmö Stadion; Attendance: 20,774; Referee: John K. Taylor (England)

28 June 1964 Nordic Championship	Sweden	4–1	Denmark	Malmö
		Report		Stadium: Malmö Stadion; Attendance: 25,678; Referee: Birger Nilsen (Norway

8 August 1971 Nordic Championship	Sweden	3–0	Norway	Malmö
		Report		Stadium: Malmö Stadion; Attendance: 15,011; Referee: Martti Hirviniemi (Finland)

29 June 1972 Nordic Championship	Sweden	2–0	Denmark	Malmö
		Report		Stadium: Malmö Stadion; Attendance: 27,632; Referee: Anders Mattsson (Finland)

25 September 1975 Nordic Championship	Sweden	0–0	Denmark	Malmö
		Report		Stadium: Malmö Stadion; Attendance: 22,187; Referee: Svein-Inge Thime (Norway)

11 August 1976 Nordic Championship	Sweden	6–0	Finland	Malmö
		Report		Stadium: Malmö Stadion; Attendance: 11,737; Referee: Torben Månson (Denmark)

7 June 1979 UEFA Euro qualification	Sweden	3–0	Luxembourg	Malmö
	Grönhagen 15'; Cervin 28'; Borg 53' (pen.)	Report		Stadium: Malmö Stadion; Attendance: 7,298; Referee: Alexander Suchanek (Poland)

14 May 1981 Nordic Championship	Sweden	1–2	Denmark	Malmö
		Report		Stadium: Malmö Stadion; Attendance: 12,807; Referee: Volker Roth (West Germany)

15 May 1983 UEFA Euro qualification	Sweden	5–0	Cyprus	Malmö
	Prytz 54', 77'; Corneliusson 58'; Hysén 62'; A.Ravelli 73'	Report		Stadium: Malmö Stadion; Attendance: 19,801; Referee: Juhani Smolander (Finland)

== Other uses ==
In 1961, the stadium had been considered suitable for a motorcycle race, and it was ultimately chosen as the host for the Speedway World Championship Final. The 15 September 1961 event (the first of its kind not to be staged at Wembley Stadium in England) was won by Swedish rider and defending champion Ove Fundin, who won the third of his five Individual World Championships. This race would prove to be the one and only World Final staged at Malmö Stadion. Beginning in 1964, any World Finals held in Sweden would be run at Ullevi Stadium, Gothenburg.

Malmö also hosted other World Championship Motorcycle speedway meetings. In 1967 it hosted the Final of the Speedway World Team Cup. The host nation Sweden won their 5th WTC title with riders Göte Nordin, Bengt Jansson, Torbjörn Harrysson and Ove Fundin. They defeated Poland, Great Britain and the Soviet Union. In 1970 Malmö hosted the Speedway World Pairs Championship which was won by New Zealand riders Ivan Mauger and Ronnie Moore. The Kiwis defeated Sweden (Ove Fundin and Bengt Jansson), and England who were represented by brothers Nigel and Eric Boocock. 1970 was the final time the stadium was used for World Championship speedway. Mauger would go on to break Ove Fundin's record of 5 World Championships by winning the title on 6 occasions. Sweden later regained a share of the record when Tony Rickardsson would win 6 World Championships between 1994 and 2005.

The use of Malmö Stadion for concerts increased since the construction of Stadion and Malmö FF's departure. After 2007, several known artists such as Ozzy Osbourne, Elton John, Dolly Parton, The Eagles, Kiss, and Rod Stewart performed at the stadium. Due to the climate in Sweden and the lack of a retractable roof at the ground, all of these concerts have been held during the height of summertime in Northern Europe, usually between June–August. The main stage for musical artists was usually placed either facing the Southern Stand or situated along one of the short sides of the stadium. The pitch was covered up with wooden floorboards during the performances, simply to minimize the damage done to the grass and the work put towards its maintenance throughout the year. Many fans and concertgoers at the shows of Elton John (as well as Dolly Parton) complained about the "less-than-impressive" sound quality of the venue, citing the stadium's layout as "unsuitable" for this kind of concert.

== Records ==
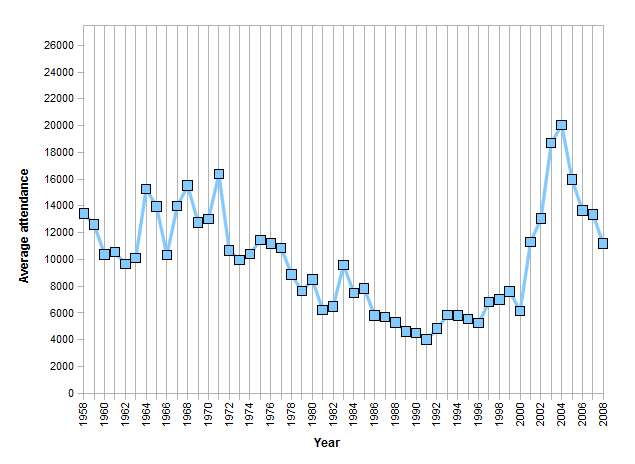
A graph of Malmö FF's average attendances over the period from 1958 to 2008

The ground's attendance record was set during the 1958 World Cup, when 30,953 spectators saw the first game ever played at the stadium, the Group 1 match between Argentina and West Germany. The match ended 3–1 in West Germany's favour. The record crowd for a Malmö FF match played at the ground was set on 24 September 1967, when 29,328 attended the Allsvenskan match between Malmö FF and Scanian rivals Helsingborgs IF. Helsingborg won the match 2–1. IFK Malmö's record attendance was set on 10 September 1969 in a Division 2 Scanian derby fixture against Helsingborgs IF which attracted 25,624 spectators to the stadium, the match ended 1–0 in Helsingborg's favour.

Malmö FF's average attendance at Malmö Stadion initially lay steady at around 15,000 per season from the mid-1960s to the early 1970s, before decreasing to around 10,000 spectators per season for the remainder of that decades. During the 1980s and the 1990s, attendances decreased even further down to an average of around 5,000 fans per season; the general interest in Swedish football was also very low at the time. Attendance took a sharp turn upwards during the 2001 season, Malmö FF's first season back in Allsvenskan after a season in Superettan. Average crowds then increased annually, and reached their peak during the 2004 season, when Malmö FF reached an all-time record average attendance of 20,061. Attendances afterwards decreased each year, and were down to a seasonal average of 11,182 by the time of Malmö FF's final season at the ground. Only 6,580 attended Malmö FF's last Allsvenskan match at the stadium, on 9 November 2008.

IFK Malmö played five Allsvenskan seasons at Malmö Stadion between 1957–58 and 1962 before being relegated to Division 2. The average attendance during these years stayed around 10,000 fans, reaching its peak at 12,787 spectators in average during the 1960 Allsvenskan season when IFK Malmö finished as runners-up.

== Transportation ==
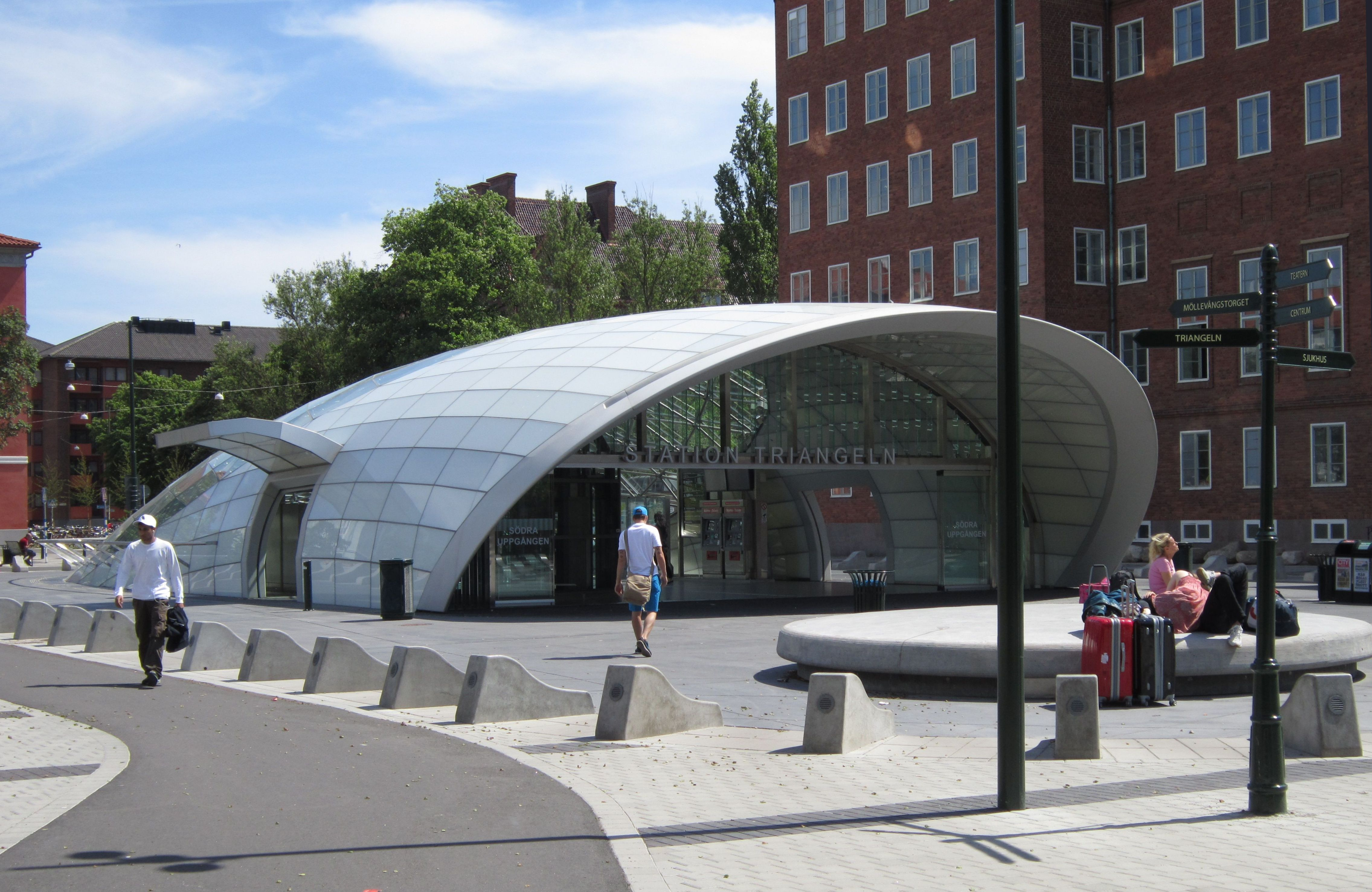
Triangeln, the closest railway station to Malmö Stadion

Just like the neighbouring Stadion, Malmö Stadion was served by Malmö bus lines 3, 5, 6 and 34, all of which stopped in the vicinity of the two stadiums. Local transit authority Skånetrafiken also operates dedicated match-day buses, branded as line 84, which run from different areas of Malmö when Malmö FF play home matches at Stadion. Due to the central location of the two stadiums within the city, parking space was limited, and spectators were advised to use public transportation, particularly for more prominent matches at Stadion. This does not apply to matchdays for IFK Malmö, as not so many fans are drawn for that club's games. Malmö Stadion was also located near the underground railway station Triangeln, which opened in December 2010 as a part of Citytunneln. The station is served by Pågatåg and Öresund Trains, and is reachable non-stop from many parts of the Öresund Region.

The closest parking location to Malmö Stadion was "P-huset Stadion", a parking garage with 440 parking spaces, which was purpose-built for Stadion. The garage opened in September 2009. It is located 100 metres (330 ft) from Stadion, just beside Malmö FF's training ground. There are also various other local parking spaces, and a large number of bicycle stands surrounding the western edge of Stadion.
