= Malmö IP =

Association football stadium in Malmö, Sweden

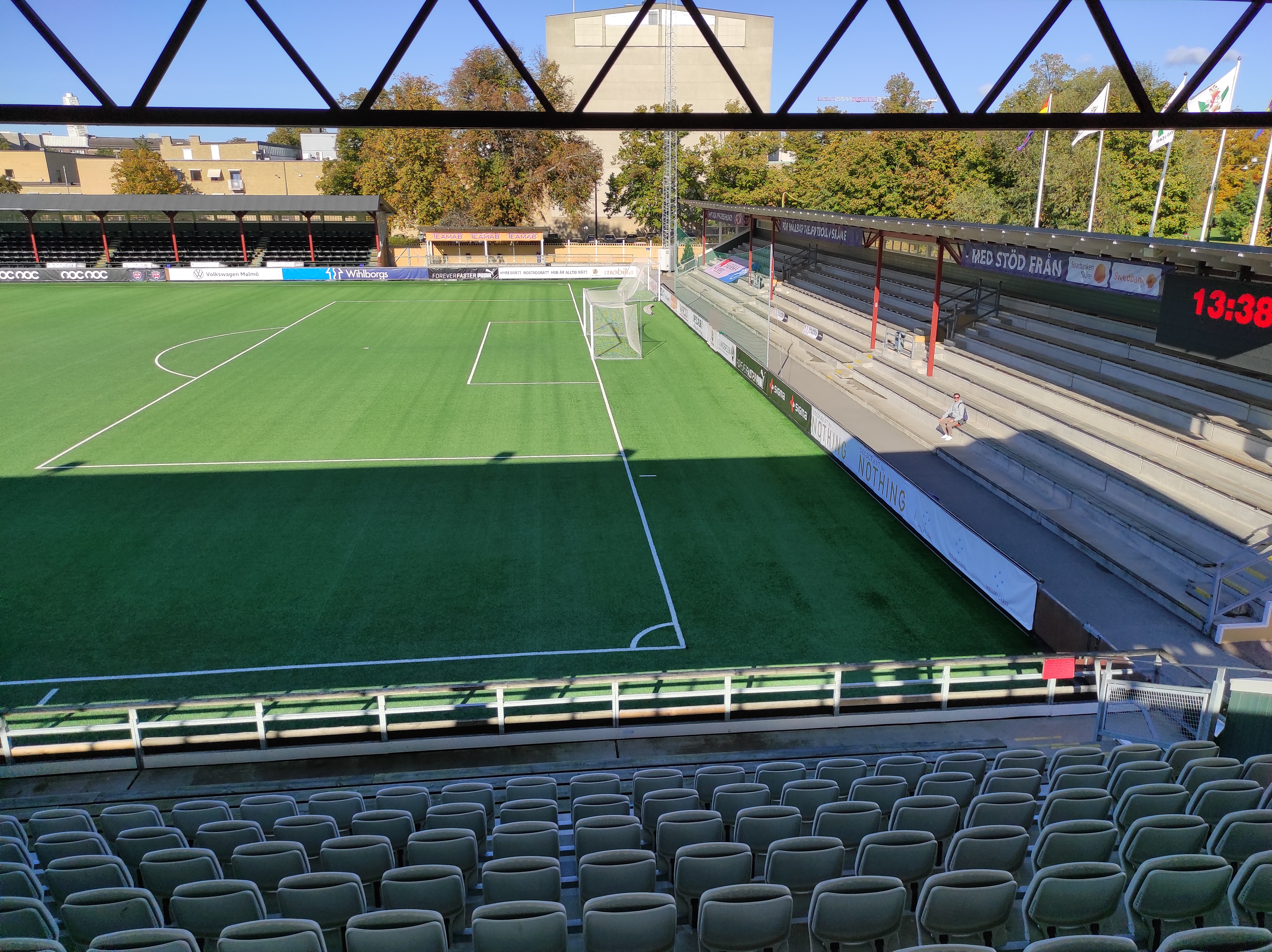
- Interior of Malmö IP, 2020
- Interactive map of Malmö IP
- Full name: Malmö Idrottsplats
- Location: Pildammsvägen 13, 214 66, Malmö
- Coordinates: 55°35′42″N 12°59′44″E
- Owner: Malmö Stad
- Operator: Malmö Stad
- Capacity: 7,600 (3,900 seated)
- Surface: Artificial turf
- Field size: 66 by 105 metres (217 ft × 344 ft)

Construction
- Built: March – July 1896
- Opened: 4 July 1896
- Renovated: 1978–1980, 1999

Tenants
- Malmö Velocipedklubb (1896–1900); IFK Malmö (1903–1958, 1999–2008); MAI (1908–1958); Malmö FF (1910–1958, 1999); FC Rosengård (Note: FC Rosengård were named Malmö FF Dam from their founding in 1970 as the women' section of Malmö FF until 11 April 2007 when they became an independent club and were renamed LdB FC Malmö. In 2013 the club merged with FC Rosengård.) (2006–present)

Malmö Idrottsplats ("Malmö sports field"), commonly referred to simply as Malmö IP and sometimes as Gamla IP ("The old sports field"), is a stadium in Malmö, Sweden, that is primarily used for association football. As of 2015, it is the home of women's association football club FC Rosengård, currently playing in Damallsvenskan; the men's clubs Malmö FF and IFK Malmö have played there in the past. The stadium is the third largest in Malmö behind Malmö Stadion and Stadion, the current home grounds of IFK Malmö and Malmö FF respectively. The Sweden men's national football team has played at Malmö IP twice, in 1929 and 1949. The stadium's capacity has changed throughout the years with various redevelopments and renovations; it is today 7,600, but was historically much higher. The record attendance at the ground was set on 1 June 1956 when 22,436 people attended an Allsvenskan match between Malmö FF and Helsingborgs IF.

The stadium was built as a multi-purpose sports field between March and July 1896 with a grand opening on 4 July 1896. IFK Malmö took up residence at the ground in 1903, with Malmö FF also doing so seven years later; both remained until 1958, when they moved to Malmö Stadion, which had just been built for the 1958 FIFA World Cup. Extensive redevelopment and restoration was carried out between 1978 and 1980, and in 1999; the two Malmö clubs returned following this latter renovation, but Malmö FF went back to Malmö Stadion after a single season. The laying of artificial turf before the 2008 season led IFK to return to Malmö Stadion in protest. The stadium is located on the northern side of Malmö's largest park, Pildammsparken, with Malmö Stadion and Stadion both to the park's south.

== History ==
=== Construction and early history (1896–1938) ===
Malmö IP was built in 1896 to host cycling, gymnastics, wrestling, athletics and tennis events. Cycling competitions had been organised by Malmö Velocipedklubb (MVK) since 24 August 1890, at a temporary sports field in Rörsjöstaden. This was also the venue for the first association football match in Malmö, a friendly match on 12 October 1890 featuring Kjøbenhavns Boldklub of Denmark. The members of MVK were impressed by the new sport and started a football section of their own. After the Rörsjöstaden field was earmarked for a new housing development in 1893, MVK began to explore the idea of a new ground. The club pitched this to the local municipality, Malmö Stad, which in February 1894 presented plans for a new sports field in the north-east of the city, in what is today Teatern, a neighbourhood in Innerstaden district. The MVK board consulted its members, then agreed and signed a 15-year lease on the site.

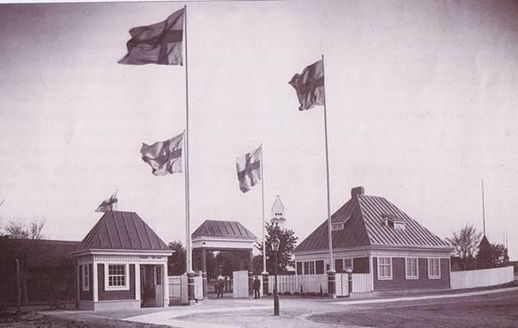
The old entrance of Malmö IP, as it appeared in the early 20th century

To raise funds for the ground's construction and the annual lease payments, an aktiebolag (limited company) called AB Malmö Idrottsplats was formed in March 1896 under the chairmanship of Carl Frick, a locally-born sea captain and sports enthusiast. The final construction costs for the new ground were 44,000 kronor, roughly 2,930,000 kronor in modern terms. The ground originally spanned 4 hectares (10 acres); an oval cycling track surrounded the grass pitch where association football and other sports were played. Construction began in March 1896 and ended in July the same year.

Malmö IP opened on 4 July 1896 with cycling competitions, accompanied by organised betting. MVK disbanded its cycling section in 1902, five years after Sweden outlawed gambling in 1897; this had caused attendances to plummet. The construction of a large pavilion in the centre of the pitch in 1899 made football impossible, contributing to the end of MVK's football section in 1900; the sport had so far failed to win much local popularity in any case. After football became more popular in Malmö in the early 1900s, the pavilion was removed in 1905, with a new pitch concurrently laid out. On 18 September 1897, Malmö IP hosted a large celebration marking King Oscar II's Silver Jubilee; over 10,000 people attended. The ground continues to be used on events such as national holidays to the present day.

Athletics overtook football and cycling competitions at Malmö IP after MVK's exit and the foundation of IFK Malmö in April 1899. IFK arranged events such as the 100 metres, the mile run, early forms of the high jump, and pentathlons involving the long jump, javelin throw, 100 metres, discus throw and wrestling. Equestrianism was popular at Malmö IP around the turn of the century, and ice skating was held during the Swedish winter months. Crown Prince Gustaf, who later became King Gustav V, attended one of IFK's athletics competitions on 7 November 1901, and reportedly enjoyed the experience very much. When he was stationed at Malmö three years later during his military education, he regularly returned to the ground to play tennis. played tennis at Malmö IP when he was stationed in Malmö during his military education in 1904.

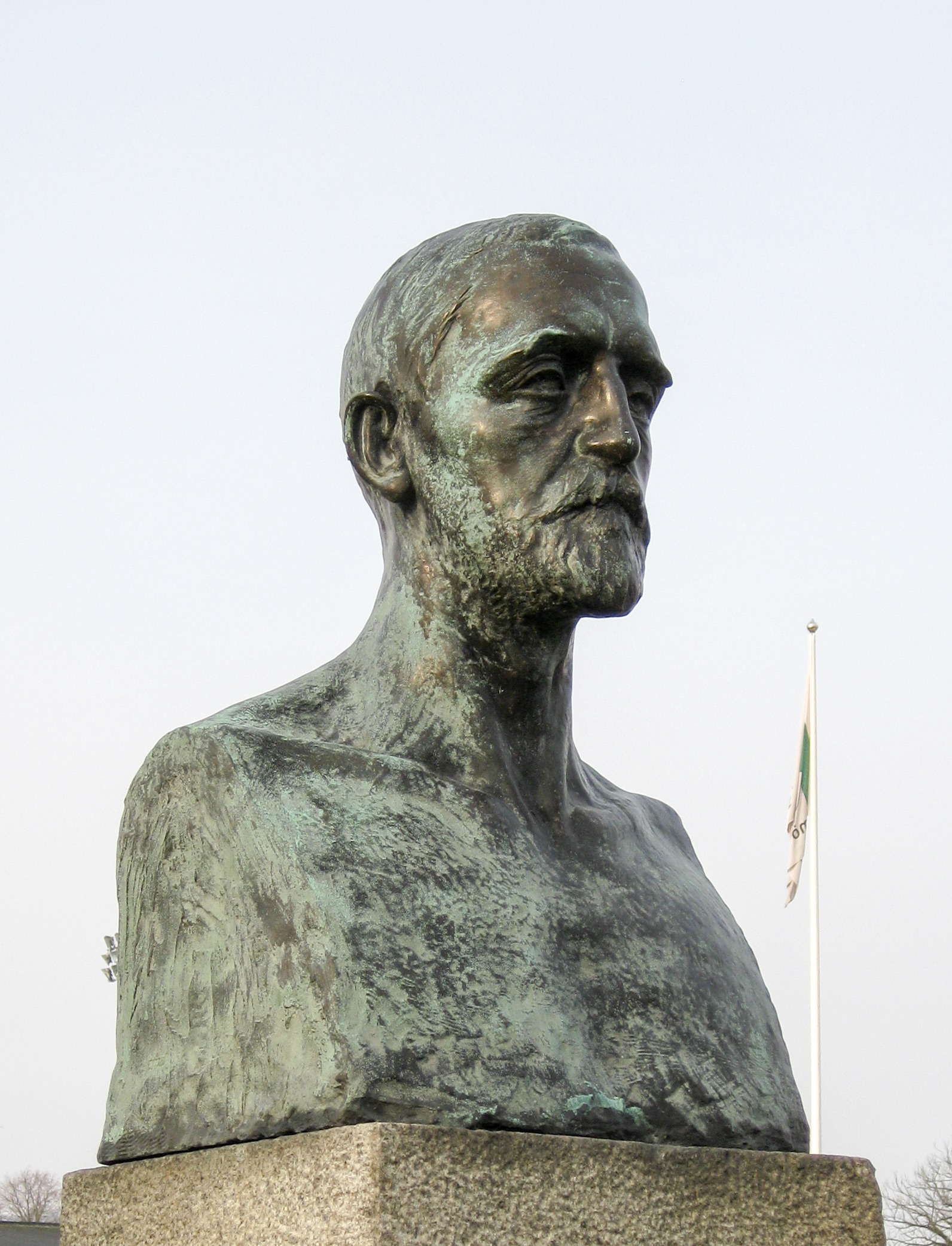
This bust of Carl Frick, the chairman of AB Malmö Idrottsplats, is today outside Malmö IP

The most successful and first club dedicated solely to football in these early years was Malmö BI (then abbreviated MBI, and now called FC Rosengård after various changes of name), which was founded in 1904 by former MVK players, and based at Malmö IP. The ground also became home to IFK Malmö's football division, which was formed in 1903. A third club, Malmö FF, took up residence at the stadium following its own foundation on 24 February 1910 by 19 men at the Malmö IP restaurant. Several members of IFK Malmö's athletics division left the club on 26 August 1908 due to differences in opinion regarding its administration; the dissidents formed Malmö Allmänna Idrottsförening (MAI) two weeks later. Swedish javelin thrower Eric Lemming set two new world records in the first international competition that MAI hosted on 10–11 July 1909.

Following the banning of betting in Sweden, as well as other events such as rainy summers and wet winters, AB Malmö Idrottsplats started to have financial difficulties and applied to the municipality for help. The annual lease payments were cancelled in 1899 and replaced with a subsidy of 1,500 kronor a year, conditional on local schoolchildren receiving free access to the pitch for a few hours each day. Stora Hallen ("The great hall"), an adjoining building that had served first as a tennis arena, then riding stables, was redeveloped in 1910 into a dance hall and restaurant called Boston Palace. This was done in the hope of increasing the ground's profits as it was struggling financially. The redevelopment was criticised by some who contended that dancing was an immoral pastime with nothing to do with sport. The financial difficulties continued into the 1910s and the city was forced to raise the yearly grant for Malmö IP. IFK Malmö and Malmö FF, the city's main association football clubs, by this time regularly played home games at the ground. When Malmö hosted the Baltic Exhibition in 1914, Malmö IP hosted relevant sporting events during June and July. The exhibition forced the municipality to rearrange the area surrounding the sports field and the surrounding road network was redrawn. Malmö IP was given a large compensation for this as the sports field area was affected by the changes.

The sports field surpassed into municipal ownership in 1938 when AB Malmö Idrottsplats's financial difficulties became too great to bear. There was also widespread criticism from minor sport clubs in Malmö against the company's tendency to favour the bigger clubs such as IFK Malmö, Malmö FF and athletics club MAI. Malmö Stad therefore voted to nationalise the ownership of both Malmö IP and other sport fields in the city in 1935, the motion passed with a small margin, 25 voted for nationalization and 23 voted for continued private ownership. Lengthy negotiations between AB Malmö Idrottsplats and the municipality's sports committee began in 1935 and ended in 1937 with a settlement of 160,000 kronor, roughly 4,600,000 kronor in modern terms. The municipality formally took over Malmö IP on 1 January 1938.

=== Municipal ownership; plans for a new stadium (1938–58) ===
Association football and athletic clubs continued to share Malmö IP after the municipal takeover. The events that attracted the biggest crowd in the 1930s and the 1940s were Malmö FF's home matches in Allsvenskan, which could attract capacity crowds of 14,000 spectators. After the capacity was increased, the record for attendance was broken again in 1939 when MAI hosted a competition honouring 25 years since the 1914 Baltic Exhibition in Malmö; over 25,000 people attended over two days. MAI also hosted other international competitions that brought large crowds to the sports field, including Amerikagalorna (The America galas), which involved visiting athletes from the United States and Swedish sportsmen and women.

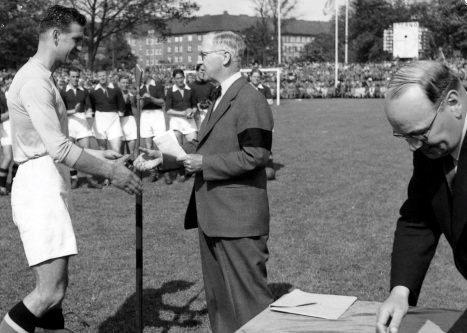
Sture Mårtensson (left) of Malmö FF receives his gold medal at Malmö IP at the end of the 1944 season, when the club first won the Swedish championship

Malmö IP's future came into official discussion first in 1933 with the proposed building of the Malmö Opera and Music Theatre; the original plans called for Malmö IP and the surrounding area to be completely demolished. The theatre was ultimately built on the edge of the stadium grounds, and only some nearby structures had to be destroyed—however, these included the building in which Malmö FF had been founded in 1910. The ground's main entrance was moved from the north to the east, where it remains to this day. A commemorative table was placed at the exact site of Malmö FF's founding in 2010 as part of the club's centenary celebrations, in what is today the theatre's parking lot.

Malmö was one of the most successful sporting cities in Sweden during the 1940s and 1950s; its clubs won national championships in several sports. Malmö FF won their first football championship at Malmö IP during the 1943–44 Allsvenskan season, and over the next decade and a half added another four league titles and five Svenska Cupen (Swedish Cup) wins. MAI, wrestling clubs Sparta and Enighet, IFK Malmö's handball division and others also won Swedish championships during this time. Several major European football clubs visited Malmö IP in the years following the Second World War to play friendlies against Malmö FF; these included A.C. Milan of Italy and Wolverhampton Wanderers, Birmingham City and Charlton Athletic from England. These matches caused new attendance records to be set several times.

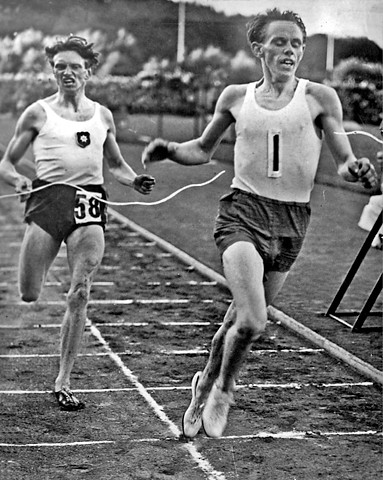
Gunder Hägg (right) and Arne Andersson (left) both set world records in the mile run at Malmö IP

Malmö was affected by World War II more than most of Sweden, which was neutral, because of the city's close proximity to German-occupied Denmark, with the Danish capital Copenhagen just opposite Malmö on the other side of the Øresund. During these years many public celebrations and events of national unification were celebrated at Malmö IP such as the National Day of Sweden on 6 June 1941, when Prime Minister Per Albin Hansson, who was born in Malmö, gave a speech. Wartime athletics competitions for military recruits were also held; events included the throwing of grenades. Athletics continued to draw large crowds to Malmö IP during the 1940s, when Gunder Hägg and Arne Andersson battled at the running tracks. The world record for the mile run was beaten twice at the stadium—first by Andersson on 18 July 1944, and then almost exactly a year later 17 July 1945 by Hägg.

By the 1950s it had become clear to the local authorities that Malmö's interest for football and other sports was becoming too big for Malmö IP to accommodate. Malmö FF in particular had high average attendances year on year, and matches were often sold out. Apart from the issue of growing popularity, the large crowds raised security issues that became apparent in the Scanian derby game between Malmö FF and Helsingborgs IF in 1951—amid considerable commotion in the stands some people were pushed against poles and fences, but nobody was seriously injured. Plans for a new stadium were first drawn up in 1943, when local officials deemed Malmö IP to be too small for major events, but council members differed on where to build the new stadium. The matter was dropped until 1954, when Sweden was chosen to host the 1958 FIFA World Cup, with matches to take place in Malmö. The new ground's location was a central issue in the discussion: some suggested a suburban location in Jägersro, to the city's south-east, while others called for a stadium in central Malmö, near the city's main park, Pildammsparken. Proponents of a central location ultimately won the day; the site was confirmed in 1954. Malmö Stadion was built on the southern side of Pildammsparken, opposite from the northern site occupied by Malmö IP. Malmö FF and IFK Malmö both moved to Malmö Stadion on its completion in 1958.

=== Reduced prominence; threatened demolition and first renovation (1958–1995) ===
The departure of Malmö FF and IFK to Malmö Stadion caused Malmö IP, which had been the centre of sport in the city since 1896, to lose much of its prominence. MAI also relocated much of its operations to the new Stadion, though it still used Malmö IP for training and some national competitions. All international events were moved to Malmö Stadion. The last major athletics tournament at Malmö IP was held in May 1970. Participants included Ricky Bruch, a champion discus thrower who went on to represent Sweden in the 1972 and 1976 Summer Olympics. MAI left Malmö IP altogether in 1971 for the Hästhagen neighbourhood, where a new sports field had opened.

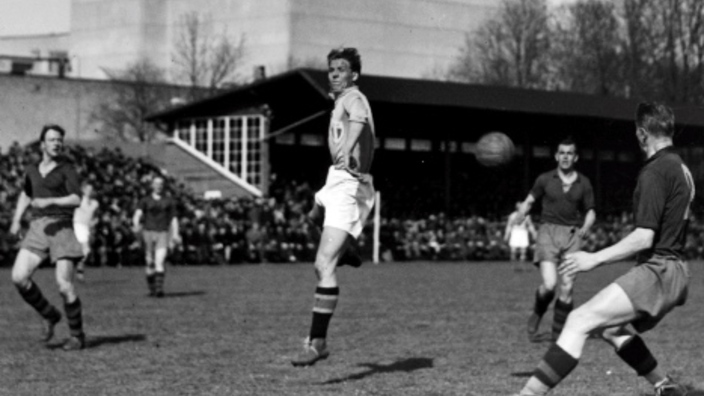
A football match between Malmö FF and Helsingborgs IF in Allsvenskan on 15 April 1945. The Northern Stand, which remains to this day, is visible in the background.

Despite the exit of Malmö FF and IFK Malmö, Malmö IP continued to host less football, albeit in a less prominent capacity. The two major clubs continued to use the ground for friendlies and pre-season fixtures. Less prominent clubs such as Malmö BI and IF Allians played at the stadium in lower divisions, mainly in the third and fourth tiers of Swedish football. Malmö BI moved to the Rosengård area in 1973, and IF Allians later moved to Kronprinsen. Ice hockey club Malmö FF Ishockey, who had played on a rink at Malmö IP since their founding in 1947, moved to the new Malmö Isstadion in 1970. Hockey games at Malmö IP during the 1960s attracted crowds of around 2,500. Team handball, which had been played at the tennis hall across the road from the main ground from the 1930s, endured until 1964, when the handball divisions of Malmö BI, IFK Malmö and Malmö FF moved to the new Baltiska hallen at Stadionområdet, near Malmö Stadion.

On 26 October 1961 Malmö Stad announced that Malmö IP would be demolished to make room for a new city hall. The initial plans earmarked the entire ground for demolition, but the negotiations and bureaucratic procedure dragged on for over a decade. The ground and its facilities deteriorated over this time, leading many of its tenants to move elsewhere. The municipality eventually dismissed the demolition plans and decided in July 1975 to renovate the stadium instead. Planning for this was concluded in 1978, and two years later the work was completed. Apart from the Northern Stand, dating back to the 1920s, all of Malmö IP's stands, buildings and facilities were destroyed; new dressing rooms and running tracks were built, but new stands were not. Malmö IP became a centre for the city's minor sports teams, hosting school tournaments, amateur football and sports such as rugby.

=== Second renovation and modern history (since 1995) ===
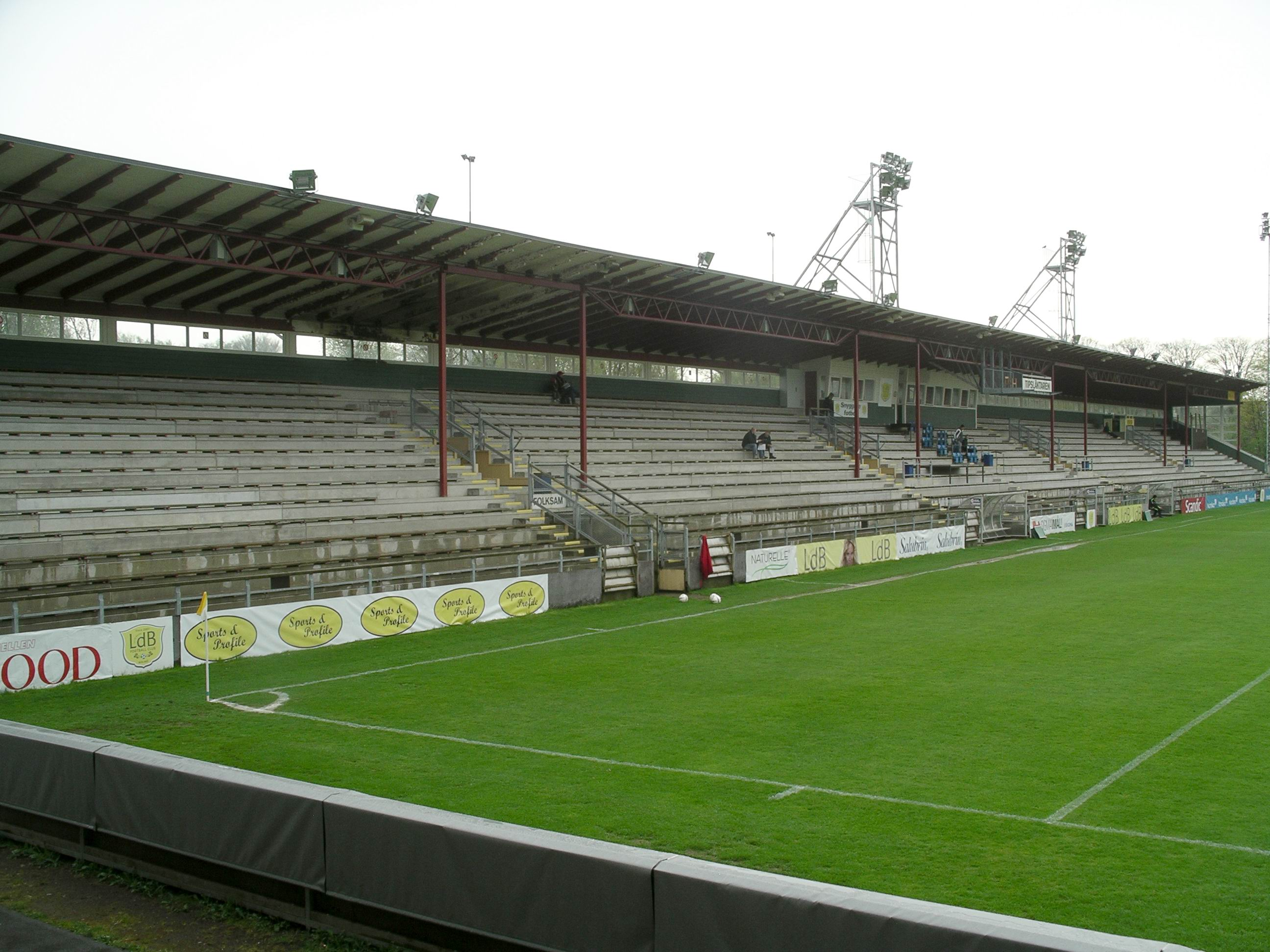
The Southern Stand, built as part of the extensive restoration completed in 1999.

In early 1995, largely on the initiative of Malmö FF's vice-chairman Bengt Madsen, Malmö FF and IFK Malmö created a joint project group regarding the future of Malmö IP. This body decided to completely renovate Malmö IP for a second time, constructing new stands and removing the running tracks to create a stadium exclusively for football. This decision was the result of both clubs' declining attendances during the 1990s—Malmö FF were averaging crowds of less than 5,000 at Malmö Stadion, while IFK were attracting less than 1,000 by 1999. Malmö Stadion's capacity of 27,500 was therefore far too much for both sides. When Malmö IP formally reopened on 1 August 1999, both Malmö FF and IFK moved back, but Malmö FF officials soon decided that the refurbished ground was too small and lacked the safety facilities Malmö Stadion offered. After only a few months, following Malmö FF's relegation from the Swedish top flight at the end of the 1999 season, the club moved back to Malmö Stadion. IFK Malmö remained at Malmö IP until 2008, when they also moved back to Malmö Stadion in protest at the decision to lay artificial turf at Malmö IP instead of grass.

Malmö FF frequently use Malmö IP for pre-season friendlies, since the artificial turf makes it possible to play during the Swedish winter months. Since Malmö FF's centenary in 2010, the club has maintained a tradition of playing a friendly at Malmö IP each year on 24 February, the anniversary of the club's foundation.

In 2006, the women's association football club Malmö FF Dam started to use the ground regularly for games in Damallsvenskan, the top level of Swedish women's football. The club has since been renamed twice and has been called FC Rosengård since 2013.

== Structure and facilities ==
Malmö IP has an overall capacity of 7,600 spectators, of which 3,900 are seated. It comprises five larger stands and one smaller stand. The main stand is the Southern Stand, which is all-seated and located along one of the long sides of the pitch. The Western and Eastern Stands, at opposite ends of the ground behind the two goals, are respectively terraced and seated. Opposite the Southern Stand are three inconsistent structures—from west to east, a stand with terracing, another with seats and a small standing area with a canopy. The dugouts, changing rooms and referees' facilities are located in the Southern Stand, which also features a small cafeteria. A sports hall called Tennishallen ("The tennis hall"), across the road from the Eastern Stand, is also considered part of the stadium.

The stadium's structure and facilities have gone through many changes since it first opened in 1896. The ground originally comprised a football pitch surrounded by an oval cycling track; a main stand was on the pitch's southern side, with a smaller stand opposite. Both stands were terraced. A larger stand, built on the northern side of the pitch in the early 1920s, is still in use, and is considered a landmark building by the city municipality—modifications to it are therefore illegal. A larger, improved Southern Stand was built in 1931, the same year of the tennis hall's construction. The tennis hall was built as part of the same plot, but it now stands on the other side of a road that was built through the grounds in 1945. The Northern Stand originally had a restaurant behind it and a large hall next to it, but these were knocked down in 1944 to make room for the Malmö Opera and Music Theatre.

When Malmö IP was renovated during the 1990s, the old running tracks were removed and new stands were built close to the pitch. The only major change since 1999 has been the change from a natural grass pitch to artificial turf in 2008. In late 2013 the artificial turf was relaid to meet new regulations and standards—the new pitch includes an under-soil heating system to allow use in all weather conditions.

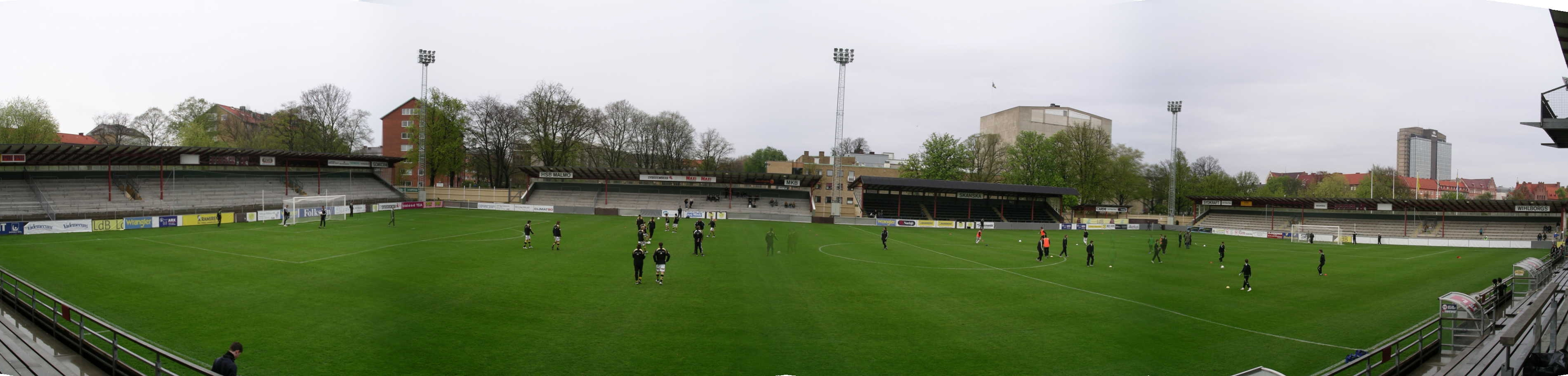
A panorama of Malmö IP in 2008 from the Southern Stand. The landmarked stand built in the 1920s is the third stand from the left.

== International football ==
Malmö IP has hosted two Sweden international matches: one friendly and one match in the Nordic Football Championship.

28 July 1929 Friendly	Sweden	10–0	Latvia	Malmö
				Stadium: Malmö IP; Attendance: 8,944; Referee: Otto Remke (Denmark)

2 October 1949 Nordic Championship	Sweden	8–1	Finland	Malmö
				Stadium: Malmö IP; Attendance: 18,247; Referee: Ludvig Jørkov (Denmark)

== Records ==
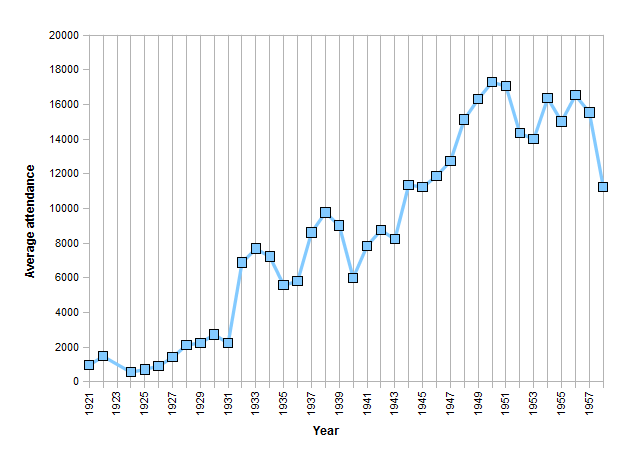
A graph showing Malmö FF's average attendances at Malmö IP between 1921 and 1958

The record for highest attendance at Malmö IP was set on 1 June 1956, when 22,436 spectators saw the Allsvenskan match between Malmö FF and Helsingborgs IF. Helsingborgs won 3–0. Malmö FF's first league game at the stadium was a Division 2 game against IS Halmia on 2 May 1920; Malmö FF won 3–0 in front of 1,277 fans.

Average attendances during Malmö FF's first seasons at the ground were below 1,000 people, except for the 1922 season when Malmö FF played in Svenska Serien, then the unofficial top flight. Apart from 1922, Malmö FF played in the second tier of Swedish football until the 1931–32 season, when they entered Allsvenskan for the first time. Attendances rose sharply to an average of around 7,000 per game. Gates continued to increase year on year until they peaked during the 1949–50 season, when Malmö FF completed the league season unbeaten—an average of 17,290 people attended the club's home games. As of 2015, this is the third highest average attendance in Malmö FF's history. Attendances varied for Malmö FF's final seasons at the stadium in the 1950s, around an average of about 15,000 spectators. The club's last league game at the stadium except for 1999, on 15 May 1958 against IFK Eskilstuna, attracted 10,013 spectators.

== Transportation ==
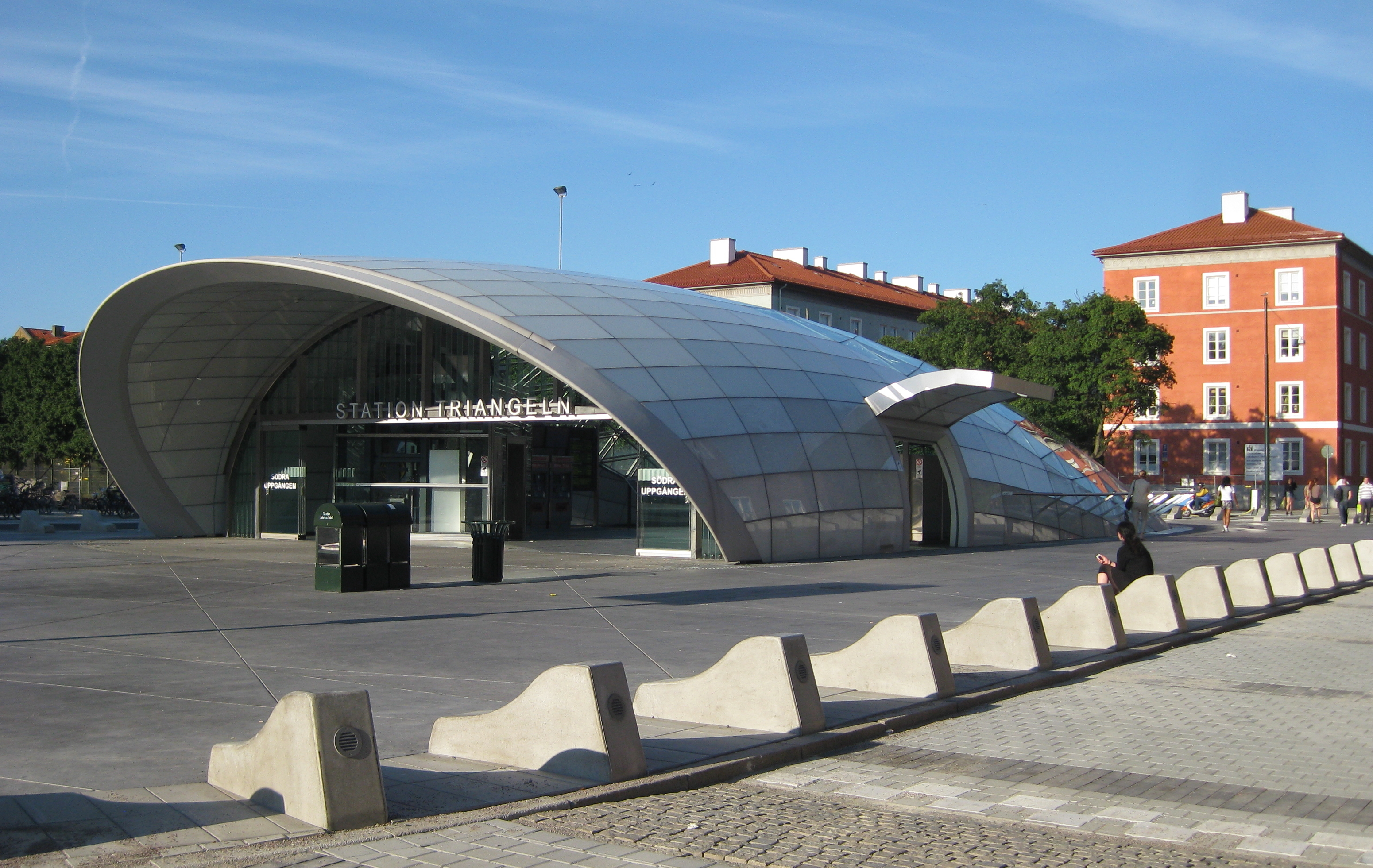
Triangeln, the closest railway station to Malmö IP

Malmö IP is served by Malmö bus lines 1, 2, 6, 7, and 8, all of which stop at Triangeln railway station, which opened in December 2010 as part of Citytunneln. The station is served by Pågatåg and Öresund Trains, and is reachable non-stop from many parts of the Öresund Region.

The closest parking location to Malmö IP is "P-huset Malmö IP", a garage with 419 parking spaces next to the stadium. There are also several parking spaces on the ground's southern side, opposite Malmö Opera and Music Theatre. Apart from these two parking areas, there are various other residential parking spaces, and a large number of bicycle stands nearby.

Malmö IP is about 15–20 minutes' walking distance from Malmö Stadion and Stadion, on the other side of Pildammsparken.
