= Stadion, Malmö =

Football stadium in Malmö, Sweden

Eleda Stadion
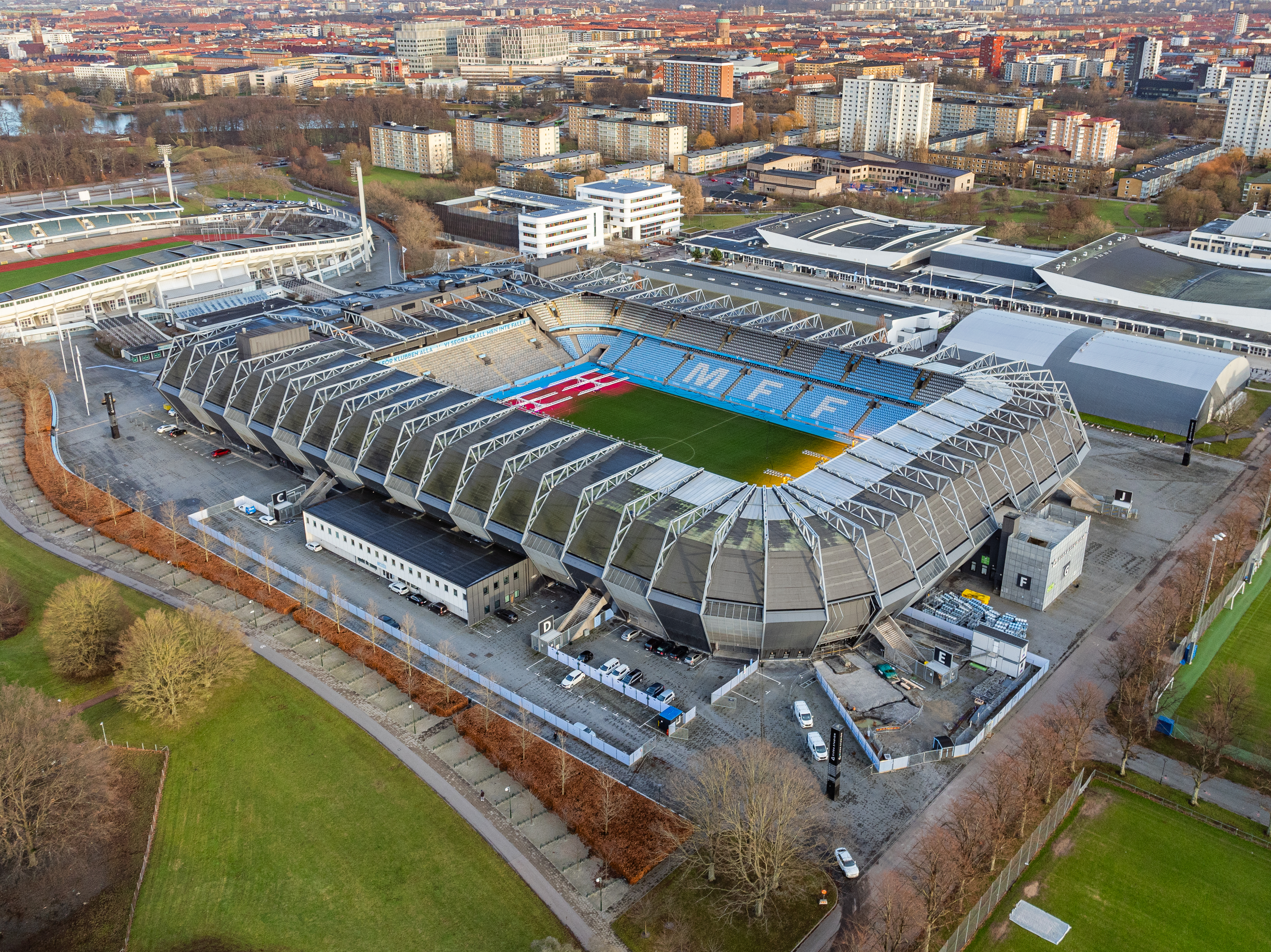
- UEFA
- Interactive map of Eleda Stadion
- Former names: Swedbank Stadion (2007–2017); Stadion (2018–2019)
- Location: Eric Perssons väg 31, 217 62 Malmö
- Coordinates: 55°35′01″N 12°59′16″E
- Owner: MFF Event AB
- Operator: Malmö FF
- Capacity: 22,500, of which 18,000 are seated. (league games); 21,000 all seated. (international games)
- Surface: Grass
- Field size: 105 by 68 metres (344 ft × 223 ft)

Construction
- Groundbreaking: 23 April 2007
- Built: 2007–2009
- Opened: 13 April 2009
- Cost: 695 million kronor (€79,7M)
- Architects: Fojab arkitekter Berg Arkitektkontor
- Structural engineer: Byggteknik i Skåne
- Main contractor: Peab

Tenant
- Malmö FF (2009–present)

Website
- Stadion at mff.se

Stadion, currently known as Eleda Stadion for sponsorship reasons, is a football stadium in Malmö, Sweden and the home of Allsvenskan club Malmö Fotbollförening, commonly known as Malmö FF. In UEFA competitions, the stadium has also been known as Malmö New Stadium and formerly known as Swedbank Stadion for sponsorship reasons. The stadium was named after Swedish-based banking group Swedbank, which owned its naming rights between 2007 and 2017. Apart from being the home of Malmö FF, Stadion has also hosted senior and youth international matches.

The stadium is the third largest used by a Swedish football club, behind AIK's Strawberry Arena and Djurgårdens IF's and Hammarby IF's 3Arena, both located in Stockholm. In league matches, the stadium has a capacity of 22,500, of which 18,000 are seated, and 4,500 standing. In European matches, the 4,500 standing places are converted to 3,000 seats, making the stadium a 21,000-capacity all-seater. Stadion opened in April 2009, and replaced Malmö Stadion, where Malmö FF had been based since 1958. The new ground was originally budgeted to cost 398 million kronor, but ultimately cost 695 million kronor (€79.7 million). It is a UEFA category 4-rated stadium, and is thus able to host all UEFA club competition matches, except for finals. The ground's record attendance, 24,148, was set in an Allsvenskan match between Malmö FF and Mjällby AIF on 7 November 2010: in this match, Malmö FF won 2–0 and clinched that year's national championship.

== History ==
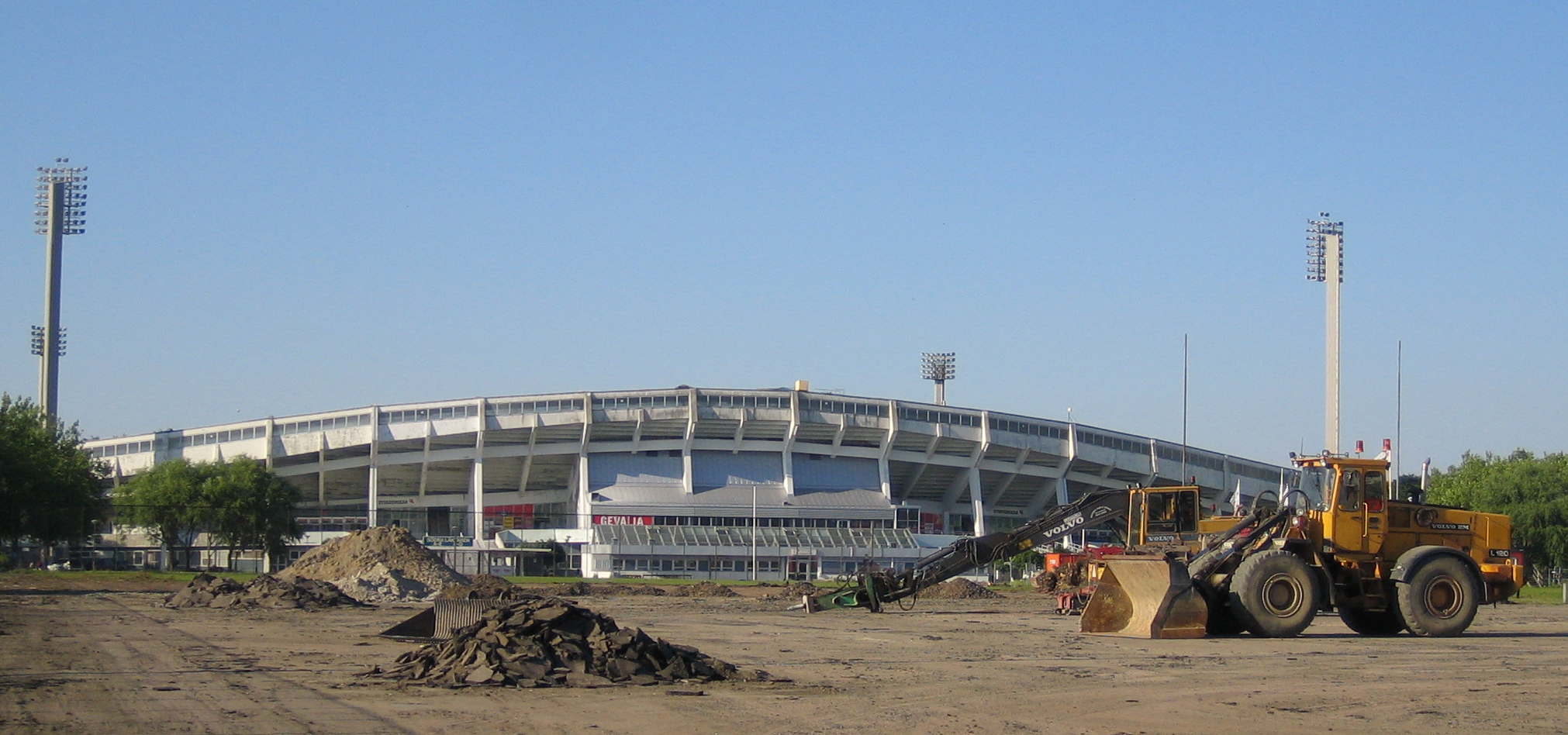
The building site of the stadium in June 2007 with Malmö Stadion in the background

Malmö FF's board of directors initiated the search for a new stadium in the mid-1990s. Malmö Stadion, where Malmö FF had played since its construction in 1958, was starting to deteriorate by this time, and was also too large for the club, which often struggled to fill it for Allsvenskan matches. In 1995, club chairman Bengt Madsen began to raise money for the renovation of Malmö IP, the club's former home between 1910 and 1957, into a modern football stadium. Malmö IP was practical and economical for the club as it was already an extant site, and was smaller than Malmö Stadion, which was expensive to maintain. The renovation of Malmö IP was finished in August 1999, and Malmö FF moved in soon after. However, the renovated ground failed to live up to expectations, proving to be very basic by modern standards; the capacity of 7,600 was also deemed a security issue. The club therefore moved back to Malmö Stadion in 2001.

The club's directors now considered constructing an entirely new stadium in Malmö. Plans for such a ground were first mooted in 2001, but were not fully considered until the end of 2004, when the team won Allsvenskan for the first time since 1989. Malmö Municipality announced on 25 April 2005 its intention to either help the club renovate Malmö Stadion, or build a new stadium in the same area. Four days later, five scenarios were laid out by the City of Malmö: the first proposed the construction of an entirely new, football-specific stadium to the south of Malmö Stadion, while the second suggested the demolition of Malmö Stadion, and the erection of a new ground for football and athletics on the same site. The third, fourth, and fifth ideas all proposed the building of two stadiums, one for football and one for athletics, on various local plots. The municipality chose the first option on 3 December 2005: the new football ground would be built south of Malmö Stadion, with a capacity of 20,000 to 25,000, on a 399 million kronor budget. Malmö Stadion, meanwhile, would be renovated into an athletics stadium for 50 million kronor.

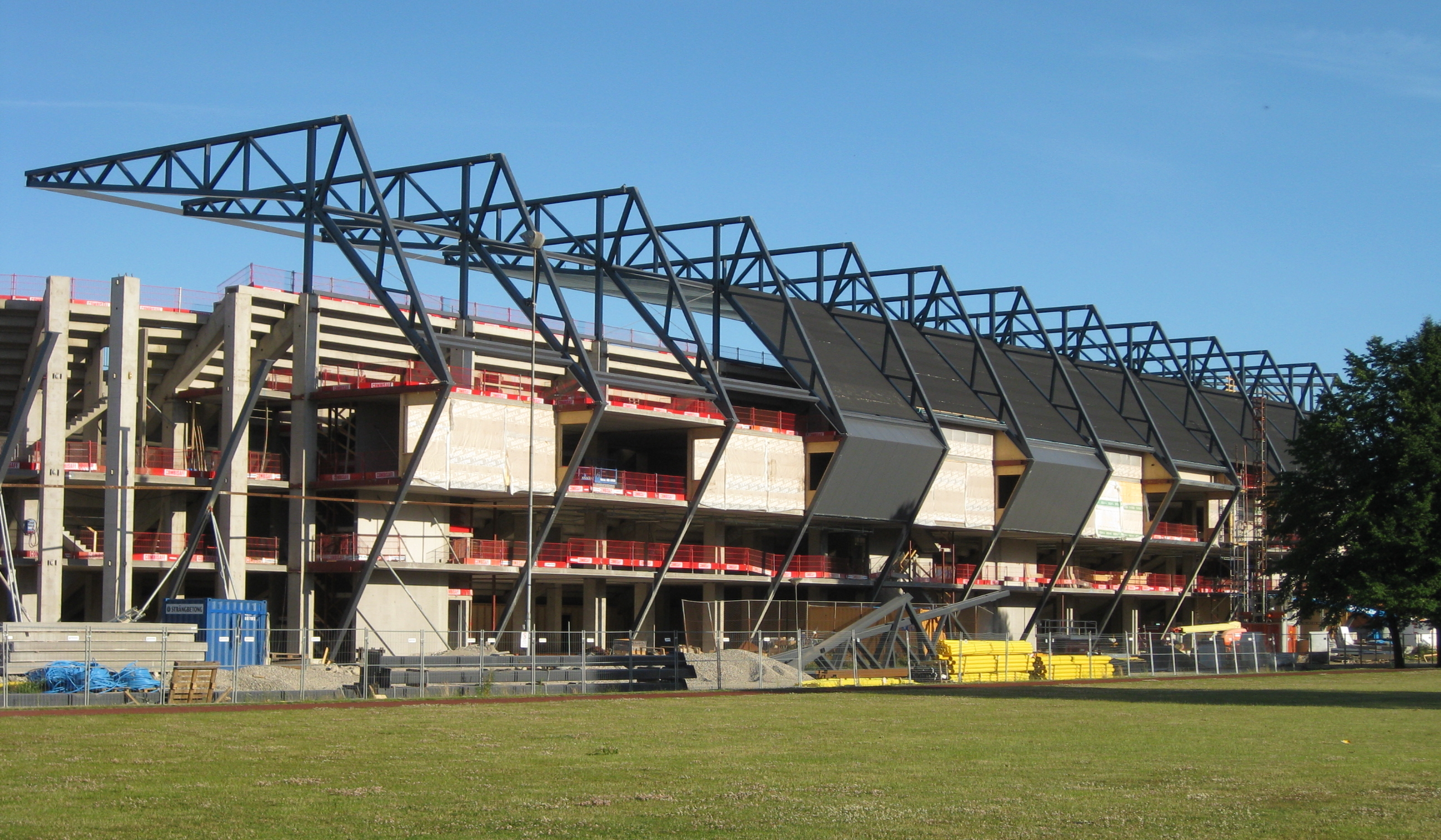
The stadium during construction in July 2008

Construction of the new stadium commenced on 23 April 2007, with the first sod being turned by Malmö FF chairman Bengt Madsen, Malmö Municipality chairman Ilmar Reepalu, club captain Daniel Andersson, and two former players: Daniel's brother Patrik, and their father Roy. The ground was designed by FOJAB Arkitekter, in collaboration with Berg Arkitektkontor, which also designed Friends Arena, the Swedish national stadium, which is in Solna. The main constructor for the new Malmö FF stadium was Peab. Its budget was ultimately heavily exceeded: Peab announced in 2009 that it would cost 695 million kronor instead of the original 399 million. The extra amount was explained as being down to miscalculations in the original budget, as well as additions made to the plans since the start of construction, which Peab reasoned made the original budget no longer entirely valid. Malmö FF announced on 12 July 2007 that they had sold the naming rights for the stadium to Swedish bank Swedbank, for a ten-year period, starting on the ground's opening. Between 2009 and 2013 the naming rights to stands inside the stadium were sold to different sponsors. At the start of the 2014 season the sponsor names of the stands were removed and the advertisement placements in front of each stand were sold to the club's largest sponsors. The graphical profile of the advertisement was also given a light blue background with white text to adhere to the club's colours. The ground's inauguration game was played several months before, on 13 April 2009, in Allsvenskan against Örgryte IS. Malmö FF won the game 3–0, and the first goal was scored by midfielder Labinot Harbuzi. All facilities related to football were completed by this time, but the office space and some exterior work was yet to be done. This was finished in late 2009. The completed building was 27 meters tall, 150 meters wide, and 215 meters in length.

On 9 May 2009, weeks after the stadium opened, part of the ground's away section was earmarked for conversion into terracing. This was because of high demand from away supporters, who had previously had to pay for a seating ticket, even though they preferred to stand. Even before this remodelling was complete, Malmö FF lowered the away ticket prices to match the price of a home terracing ticket. This restructuring was completed before the 2010 season. The terracing for the home supporters was also modified to ease mobility, and combat safety issues in the stands. The old pitch was removed and a new one was installed in preparation for the 2015 Allsvenskan season. The new surface was produced from the same Dutch grass producer who provided the pitch for the 2015 UEFA Champions League Final at Olympiastadion Berlin. UEFA had previously criticized the surface at the stadium following the 2014–15 UEFA Champions League group stage.

The naming sponsorship rights deal with Swedish-based banking group Swedbank ran out at the end of 2017. This meant that the club temporarily renamed the stadium "Stadion" until a new sponsorship deal could be reached.

== Structure and facilities ==
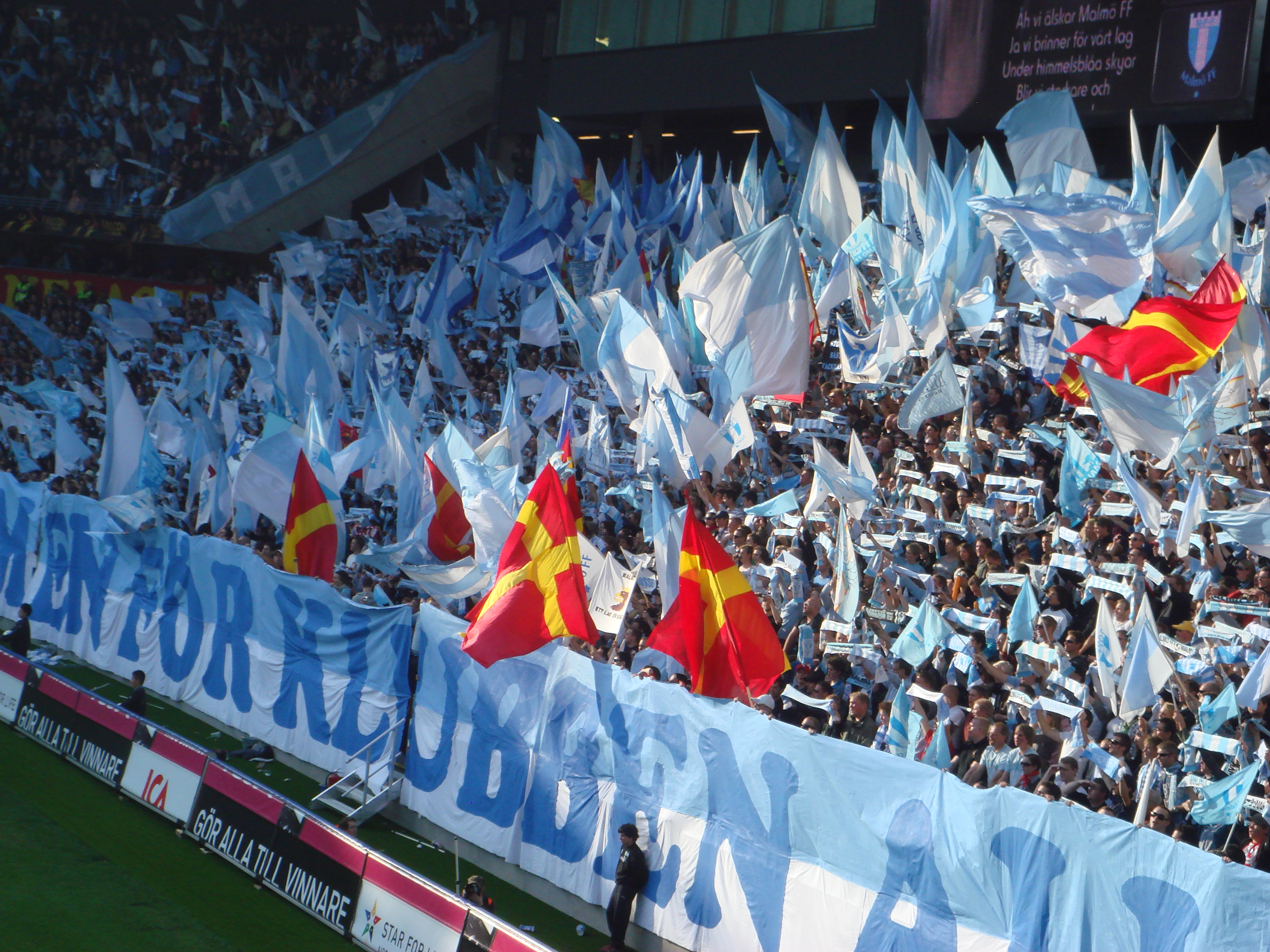
The Northern Stand has a capacity of 4,500 supporters.

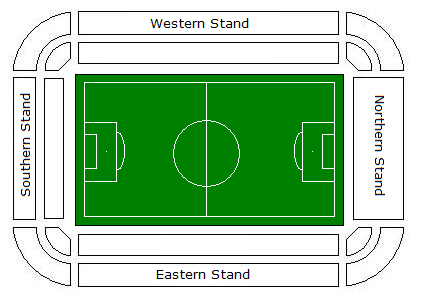
A diagram showing the alignment of stands at Stadion

Stadion has a capacity of 22,500 spectators. It comprises four stands: the Western Stand; the Eastern Stand and the Southern Stand, both of which have two tiers; and the Northern Stand, which is terraced. The lower-right part of the Southern Stand also features terracing for away supporters, but the rest of the stand is seated. The lower tier has 10,000 seats, and the upper tier has 8,000 seats. The Northern Stand has a capacity of 4,500 standing supporters, which can be transformed into an all-seated section with a capacity of 3,000 if required. This is done for matches played by Malmö FF in Europe.

The Northern Stand holds the most season ticket-holders. It is a single-tier terracing section, with railing in various places across the stand for security and comfort. It can hold up to 100 wheelchair users and their companions in a dedicated section. The stand also houses conference facilities with views of the pitch, as well as the 2,000-capacity "Restaurang 1910" in the inside area, behind the terraced area of the stand, and a health club run by Friskis & Svettis. Malmö FF's official souvenir shop is on the outside of the stand, alongside a sports bar, which holds up to 250 guests. The Eastern and Western Stands house 54 VIP boxes between them, which is more than any other football stadium in Sweden. Including all sports, is the second most after the multi-purpose indoor arena Malmö Arena, which has 72 boxes. The Eastern and Western Stands also have 2,000 club seats along their upper tiers. These seats are more comfortable than the regular seats, and come with half-time meals and snacks in "Restaurang 1910". The Western Stand includes seating for the press, as well as a large press room inside the stand. The president's box, which holds up to 60 people, is also in the Western Stand.

There are 24 vending stands in the corridor area behind the stands, with a selection of snacks, light meals, and beverages. Other facilities include exhibition space, 330 toilets for men, 120 for women, and six for the physically challenged. Pre-match and half-time activities take place behind the terracing of the Northern Stand. This area is called Ståplatstorget ("The terracing square"), and includes eight vending stands and MFF Support's supporter centre. At the supporter centre, fans can buy souvenirs, and tickets to away matches. The square also contains publicly accessible benches and tables. Access between the areas of the stadium was limited by a system of security gates until the end of the 2011 season, when Malmö FF announced that supporters would be able to roam the stadium freely, except for the areas occupied by away supporters. This was done to create a more free and friendly atmosphere, and to encourage fans to arrive earlier for matches. To further motivate spectators to come early, pre-match activities are often held at Ståplatstorget.

The lower tier of the Southern Stand is reserved for away supporters, with most of the stand being seated. The western part of the stand, however, is converted into terracing for domestic league games. The area reserved for away supporters varies from game to game depending on how many away fans are expected: the allocation's size is altered by restricting access to and from the area with large safety nets, which are laid across the seating and supervised by stewards. The away section is small for most Allsvenskan matches, with the most notable exceptions being matches against Helsingborgs IF, AIK, Djurgårdens IF, and IFK Göteborg. These matches tend to draw larger away attendances, and the away area is therefore accordingly expanded across the entire lower tier of the Southern Stand.

In tribute to former manager Roy Hodgson and his successful time at Malmö, the club's fans have unofficially named the upper corner of the Eastern Stand closest to the Northern Stand "Roy's Hörna" (Roy's Corner). The corresponding corner of the Western Stand on the other side of the Northern Stand is named "Bob's Hörna" (Bob's Corner) in tribute to Bob Houghton. These sections are known as "Sjungande sittplats" (Singing seating) since the two sections are fitted with seats but where the majority of the spectators are standing fans that sings in correlation with the fans on the terracing at the Northern Stand between the two sections. Both Hodgson and Houghton had successful managerial careers at Malmö FF, they both won multiple league and cup titles while at the club.

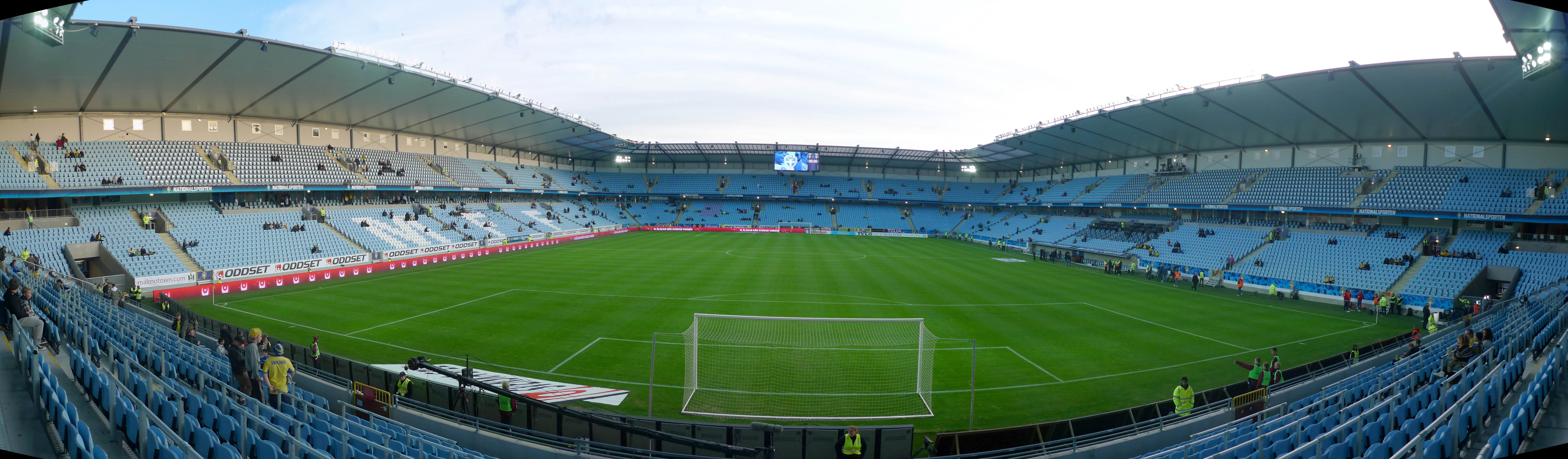
A panorama of Stadion from the Northern Stand, showing, from left to right, the Eastern Stand, the Southern Stand and the Western Stand

== Ownership and financials ==
Stadion is owned by MFF Event AB, a company fully owned by Malmö FF.

Originally, three parties owned the stocks in the stock company, Peab owned 50% of the stocks, Malmö FF owned 25%, and Erling Pålsson Teknik & Fastighets AB owned the remaining 25%. Malmö FF early expressed their desire to buy the stocks of Peab and Erling Pålsson to reduce rent on the stadium and increase profits. On 27 April 2012, it was announced that Malmö FF were close to buying the full 25% of stocks owned by Erling Pålsson and 25% of the stocks owned by Peab, increasing their own share to 75% and leaving Peab with a 25% share. On 1 May 2012, Malmö Stad granted the bailment needed for Malmö FF to buy the stocks. The deal, worth 90 million kronor, was finalised on 13 June 2012. The long-term goal for Malmö FF was to buy the remaining 25% of the stocks to fully own Stadion. Malmö FF bought a further 6.25% of the stocks after they qualified for the group stage of the 2014–15 UEFA Champions League. After the club qualified for a second consecutive time in 2015–16, it was announced that the remaining 18.75% of the stadium would be purchased by the club. The remaining stocks were bought by Malmö FF during 2016, leaving them with the sole ownership of the stadium.

== Other uses ==
Stadion hosted the finals of the 2009 UEFA Under-21 Championships, along with three group stage games. After this, the all-seater away section was refitted with terracing for away fans. The stadium hosted its first full national team game on 7 September 2010, when Sweden played against San Marino in a qualifier for the 2012 UEFA European Football Championship. Sweden won 6–0. The stadium hosted Svenska Supercupen in 2011, after Malmö FF won the Swedish league championship the previous year. The possibility of the stadium hosting 2014 FIFA World Cup qualification fixtures for Iraq was raised after a friendly between Iraq and Brazil on 11 October 2011. The most recent international match at the stadium was a 2023 FIFA Women's World Cup qualification between Sweden and Slovakia on 30 November 2021.

The stadium hosted its first concert on 16 April 2011, when Swedish ska group Hoffmaestro & Chraa performed. The concert was held at Ståplatstorget, the large area behind the Northern Stand terraces. The concert was attended by 3,000, and there were some concerns regarding the suitability of the venue after the concrete floor started rocking. However, safety checks the next day showed that the structure had not been damaged, and was suitable to host similar events in the future. On 1 November 2016, the stadium hosted a public mass led by Pope Francis as part of his two-day visit to Scania.

=== International football matches ===
16 June 2009 2009 UEFA Under-21	Sweden U21	5–1	Belarus U21	Malmö
18:15 UTC+2	Martynovich 34' (o.g.); Berg 38', 44', 81'; Svensson 89'	UEFA; SvFF	Kislyak 33'	Stadium: Swedbank Stadion; Attendance: 14,623; Referee: Claudio Circhetta (Switzerland)

19 June 2009 2009 UEFA Under-21	Belarus U21	0–0	Serbia U21	Malmö
18:15 UTC+2		Report		Stadium: Swedbank Stadion; Attendance: 3,313; Referee: Cüneyt Çakır (Turkey)

23 June 2009 2009 UEFA Under-21	Serbia U21	1–3	Sweden U21	Malmö
20:45 UTC+2	Kačar 27'	UEFA; SvFF	Berg 7', 15' (pen.); Toivonen 29'	Stadium: Swedbank Stadion; Attendance: 19,820; Referee: Pedro Proença (Portugal)

29 June 2009 2009 UEFA Under-21	Germany U21	4–0	England U21	Malmö
20:45 UTC+2	Castro 23'; Özil 48'; Wagner 79', 84'	Report		Stadium: Swedbank Stadion; Attendance: 18,769; Referee: Bjorn Kuipers (Netherlands)

15 November 2009 2011 UEFA U-21 qualification	Sweden U21	5–1	Kazakhstan U21	Malmö
17:00 UTC+1	Fejzullahu 32', 50', 56', 67'; Ekdal 60'	Report	Shomko 89'	Stadium: Swedbank Stadion; Attendance: 2,507; Referee: Paulius Malzinskas (Lithuania)

7 September 2010 UEFA Euro 2012 qualification	Sweden men	6–0	San Marino	Malmö
20:00 UTC+2	Ibrahimović 7', 77'; D. Simoncini 12' (o.g.); A. Simoncini 26' (o.g.); Granqvist 51'; Berg 90+3'	Report		Stadium: Swedbank Stadion; Attendance: 21,083; Referee: David McKeon (Republic of Ireland)

11 September 2012 2014 World Cup qualification	Sweden men	2–0	Kazakhstan men	Malmö
20:30 UTC+2	Elm 37'; Berg 90+4'	Report		Stadium: Swedbank Stadion; Attendance: 20,414; Referee: Serhiy Boiko (Ukraine)

11 October 2012 Friendly	Brazil men	6–0	Iraq	Malmö
20:30 UTC+2	Oscar 22', 27'; Kaká 48'; Hulk 56'; Neymar 75'; Lucas Moura 80'	Report		Stadium: Swedbank Stadion; Attendance: 14,147; Referee: Martin Hansson (Sweden)

3 June 2013 Friendly	Sweden men	1–0	(North) Macedonia men	Malmö
19:00 UTC+2	Kačaniklić 39'	Report		Stadium: Swedbank Stadion; Attendance: 14,459; Referee: Pavel Královec (Czech Republic)

6 September 2013 2015 UEFA U-21 qualification	Sweden U21	3–1	Poland U21	Malmö
18:30 UTC+2	Thern 15'; Hrgota 21'; Ishak 56'	Report	10' (o.g.)	Stadium: Swedbank Stadion; Attendance: 1,538; Referee: Georgi Kabakov (Bulgaria)

21 September 2013 2015 FIFA WWC qualification	Sweden women	2–0	Poland women	Malmö
17:30 UTC+2	Seger 52'; Schelin 66'	UEFA; SvFF		Stadium: Swedbank Stadion; Attendance: 6,112; Referee: Kateryna Monzul

19 November 2013 2015 UEFA U-21 qualification	Sweden U21	5–0	Malta U21	Malmö
18:00 UTC+1	Guidetti 11', 27'; Claesson 20'; Hrgota 34'; Nyman 68'	Report		Stadium: Swedbank Stadion; Attendance: 334; Referee: George Vadachkoria (Georgia)

30 May 2016 Friendly	Sweden men	0–0	Slovenia men	Malmö
19:30 UTC+2		Report		Stadium: Swedbank Stadion; Attendance: 16,925; Referee: Jakob Kehlet (Denmark)

5 September 2016 2017 UEFA U-21 qualification	Sweden U21	1–1	Spain U21	Malmö
18:45 UTC+2	86' (o.g.)	Report	Deulofeu 50'	Stadium: Swedbank Stadion; Attendance: 4,454; Referee: Hugo Miguel (Portugal)

30 November 2021 2023 FIFA WWC qualification	Sweden women	3–0	Slovakia women	Malmö
19:00 UTC+1	Hurtig 19'; Rolfö 59'; Ilestedt 69'	UEFA; SvFF		Stadium: Eleda Stadion; Attendance: 8,123; Referee: Angelika Söder

== Records and awards ==
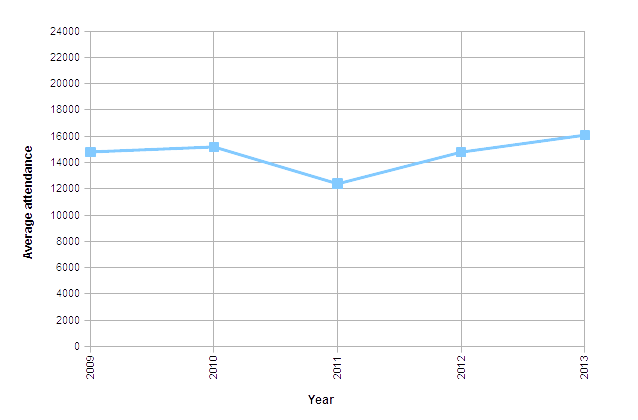
A graph of Malmö FF's average attendances over the period from 2009 to 2013

The ground's present attendance record was set on 7 November 2010, when Malmö FF beat Mjällby AIF 2–0 in Allsvenskan before 24,148 fans. The game was the last of the season, and the victory secured that year's league championship for Malmö FF. The record crowd for the stadium as an all-seater was recorded when Sweden beat San Marino 6–0 in a Euro 2012 qualifying game on 7 September 2010. The match was attended by 21,083. The first match played at Stadion, a 3–0 Allsvenskan victory for Malmö FF against Örgryte IS on 13 April 2009, attracted 23,347 spectators. The highest average attendance for Malmö FF at Stadion was in the 2013 Allsvenskan championship winning season when the average attendance was 16,093, the second highest attendance in the league during that year.

The stadium was awarded Stålbyggnadspriset, an award given for innovative use of steel in constructions, by Stålbyggnadsinstitutet in 2009.

== Transport ==
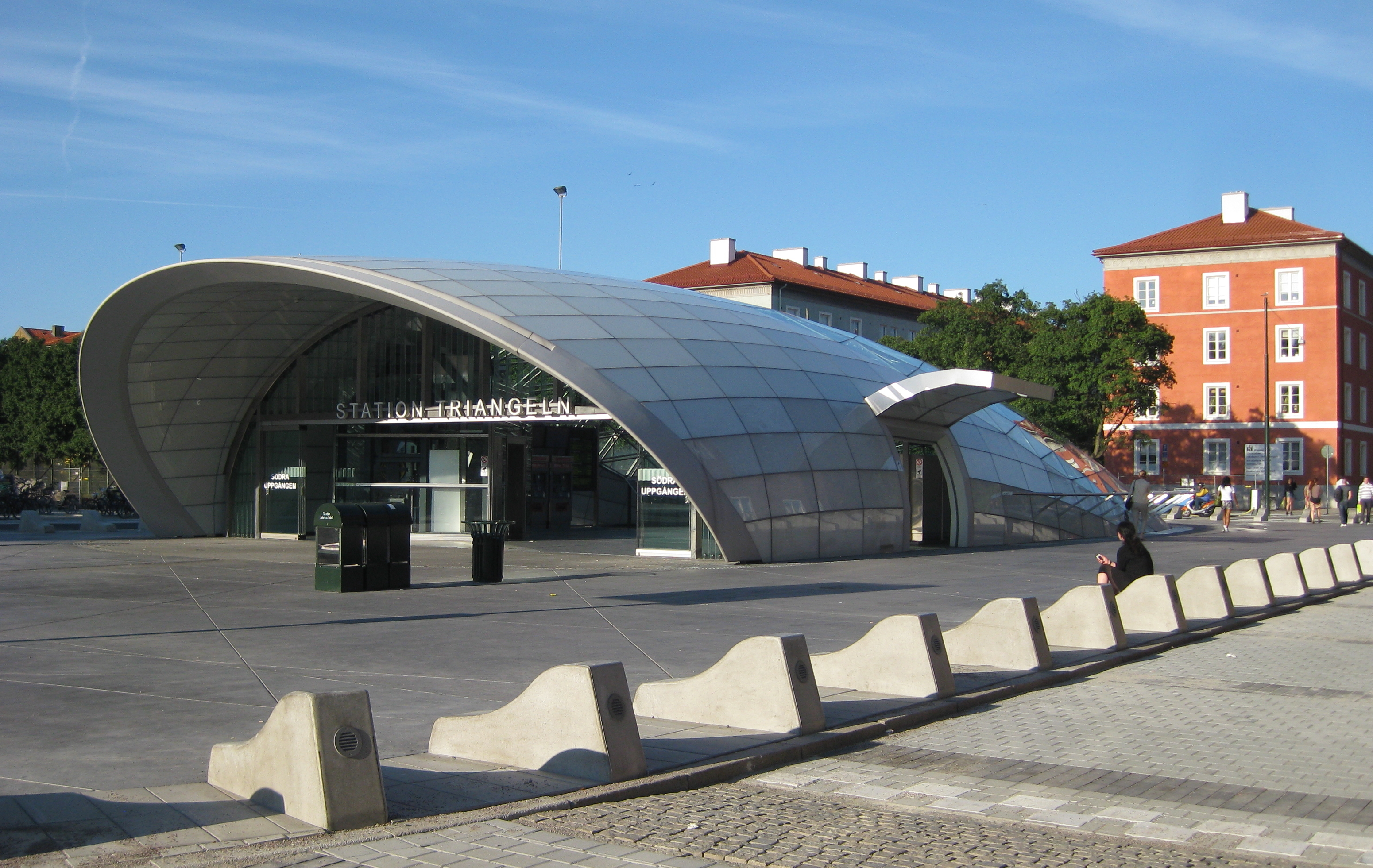
Triangeln

Triangeln is the closest railway station to Stadion is served by Malmö bus lines 3, 5, 6, and 34, all of which stop in the vicinity of the stadium. Local transit authority Skånetrafiken also operates dedicated match-day buses, branded as line 84, which run to the stadium from different areas of Malmö. Due to the central location of the stadium within the city, parking space is limited, and spectators are advised to use public transportation, particularly for more prominent matches. The stadium is also located close to the underground railway station Triangeln, which opened in December 2010 as a part of Citytunneln. The station is served by Pågatåg and Öresund Trains, and is reachable non-stop from many parts of the Öresund Region.

The closest parking location to Stadion is "P-huset Stadion", a parking garage with 440 parking spaces, which was purpose-built for the ground and opened in September 2009. It is located 100 metres (330 ft) from the stadium, just beside the club's training ground. There are also various other local parking spaces, and a large number of bicycle stands surrounding the western edge of the stadium.

== See also ==
- List of football stadiums in Sweden
- Lists of stadiums
