= Carl Frick =

Swedish sea captain and corporate leader

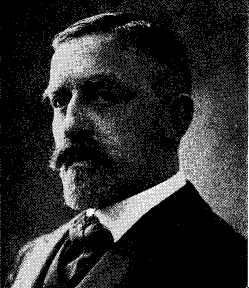
- Born: September 19, 1863; Malmö, Sweden
- Died: July 29, 1924 (aged 60); Malmö, Sweden

Carl Frick (19 September 1863 – 29 July 1924) was a Swedish sea captain and corporate leader.

== Life ==
Born in Malmö on 19 September 1863, Frick completed his officer degree in 1883. He continued to study and completed his steamboat captain degree and sea captain degree in 1885 at the School of Naval Navigation in Malmö. He was employed by the merchant navy between 1880 and 1890. He was later employed by Sjöförsäkrings AB Öresund, a naval insurance company, where he became head of division in 1892. Frick later started his own insurance company, first named von Essen & Frick in 1895 and later Frick & Frick in 1903. The company became an aktiebolag in 1917.

Frick later entered the corporate world when he became chairman of the board at Pehr Fricks fabrikers AB in 1908. During the 1910s he took on several other chairmanships in minor companies in Malmö and Scania. Frick became a member of Malmö's city council in 1909, a position he held until 1912. He was a sports enthusiast and worked hard for sport in Malmö. In 1898 he founded AB Malmö Idrottsplats, a company designed to build a permanent sport field in Malmö, Malmö IP. A statue of Frick stands outside Malmö IP to honour his involvement in its construction.
