= Friskis & Svettis =

Swedish nonprofit organization

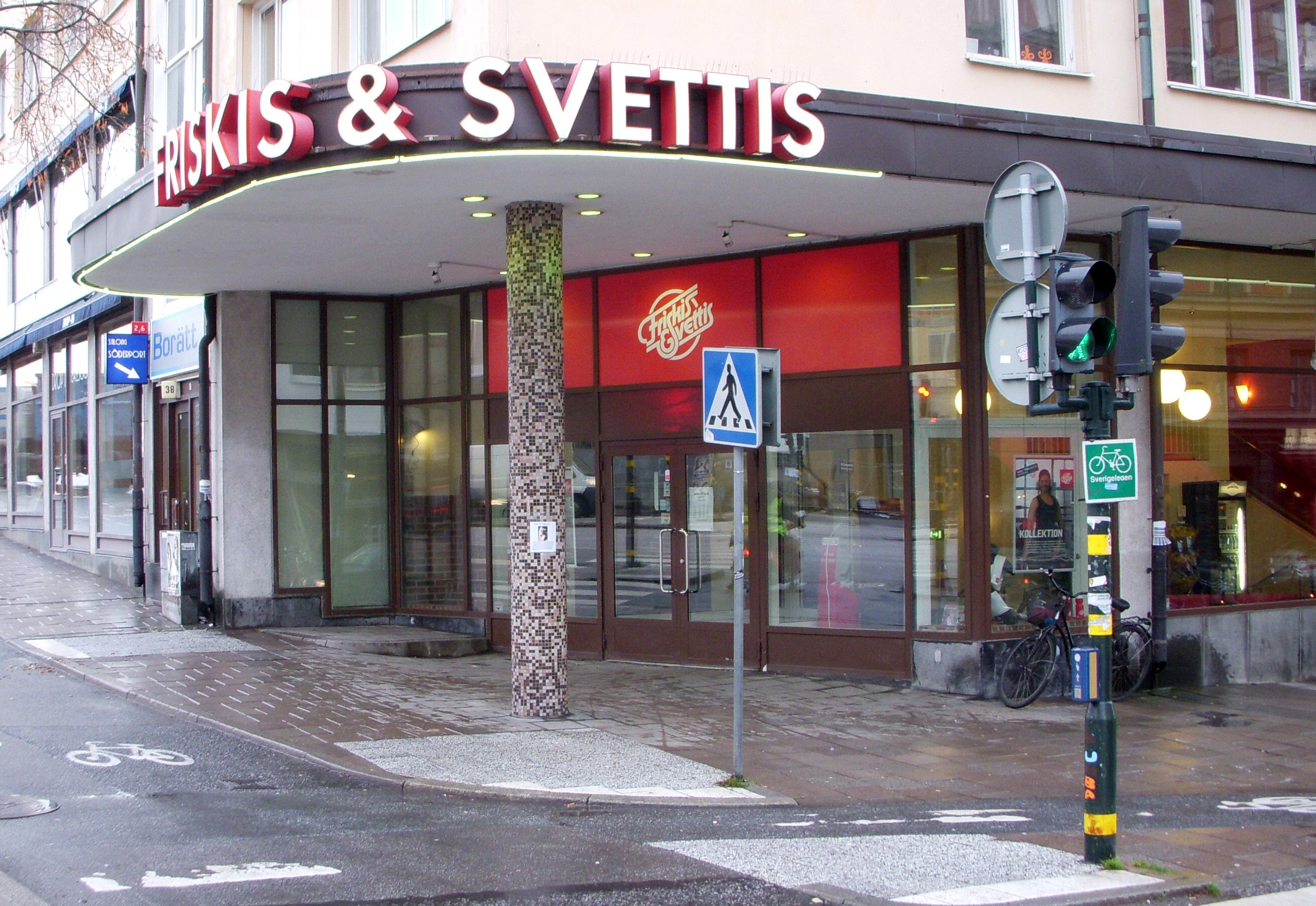
Friskis&Svettis at Hornstull, Stockholm.

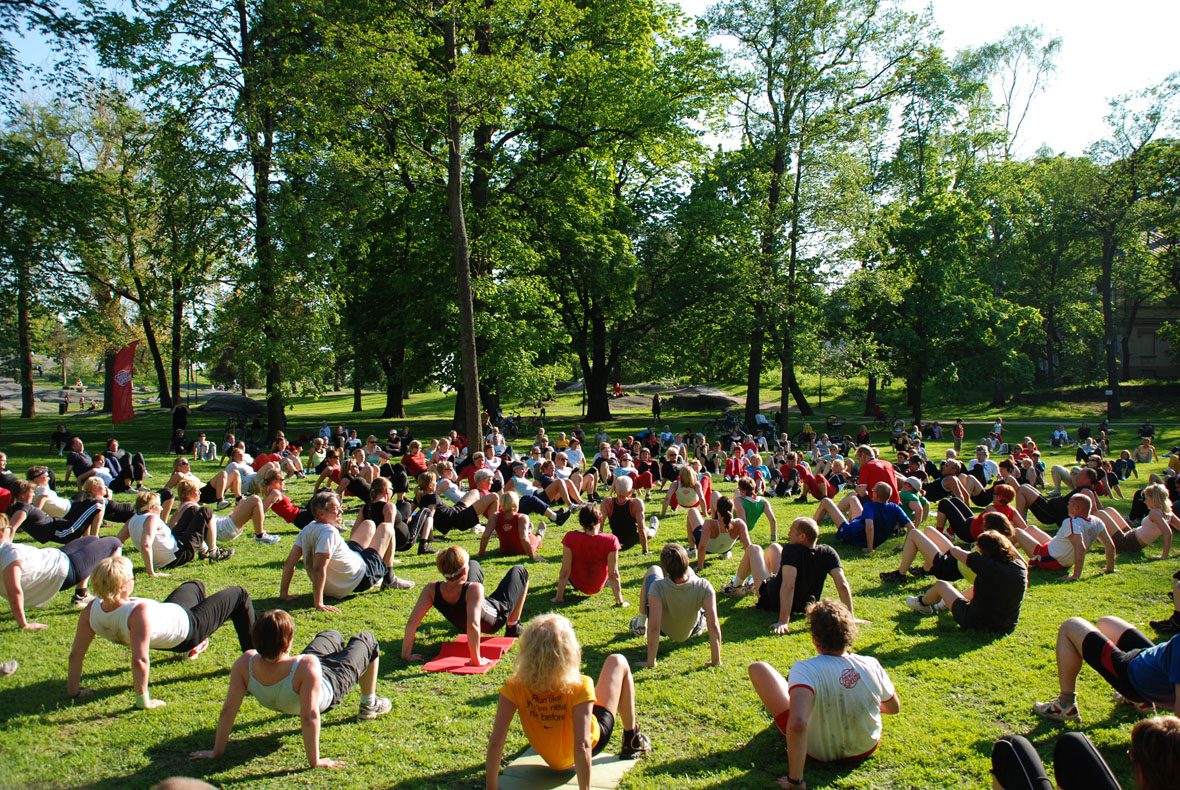
Outdoor training with Friskis & Svettis in Helsinki.

Friskis&Svettis (roughly translated as Healthy & Sweaty (Note: The organisation does not market itself internationally with a translated English-language name. Grammatically, the Swedish name uses the -is suffix with the words frisk (healthy) and svettig (sweaty) to make diminutive and nominative forms of the words, i.e., svettis being a colloquial term for a person who is sweaty.)) is a non-profit organization of Swedish origin aiming at providing various forms of exercise. A unique feature of Friskis&Svettis is that all work in the organization is based on volunteers. Friskis&Svettis is today one of Sweden's largest organizations. Since its inauguration in 1978, with only one participant at the premier "Jympa"-session, Friskis&Svettis by 2009 had a total number of paying members exceeding 500,000 in Sweden, equalling 4.21% of the country's total population. Many clubs in Sweden even have more than 10% of their city's population as members.

Friskis&Svettis features several forms of activities, ranging from outdoor activities, such as Nordic Walking, Jogging and Cross-Training. Its original activity and core product is the "Jympa", a unique Swedish way of training developed by Friskis&Svettis's founder Johan Holmsäter. The word is derived from gymnastics. A jympa session is rather similar to aerobics class in exercise content, but tend to be less choreographed and less coordination-requiring. The jympa concept does not assume that participants regularly attend a specific instructor's session. Also, the profile of jympa in Sweden has tended to be more informal in comparison to aerobics, attracting a wider variety of participants.

Smaller Friskis&Svettis clubs usually use school or general sports facilities for their activities, while larger clubs tend to have their own facilities and have all the outward appearance of a commercial gym. The concept of Jympa, together with Friskis&Svettis maintaining its status as non-profit, has maintained the organization at a unique position on the Swedish exercise market with continued growth despite fierce competition with commercial gyms such as SATS and World Class Training offering similar activities.

In 2016 Friskis&Svettis controversially offered free training to unaccompanied refugee youths.

There are today several local Friskis&Svettis training centers set up outside of Sweden, most notably in Norway, with 35 branches, as well as activity in Helsinki, Vantaa, Copenhagen, Brussels, Paris, Luxembourg, London and Aberdeen. All of these branches use the concept of Jympa as its core product.
