= Pildammsparken =

- Neighbourhood
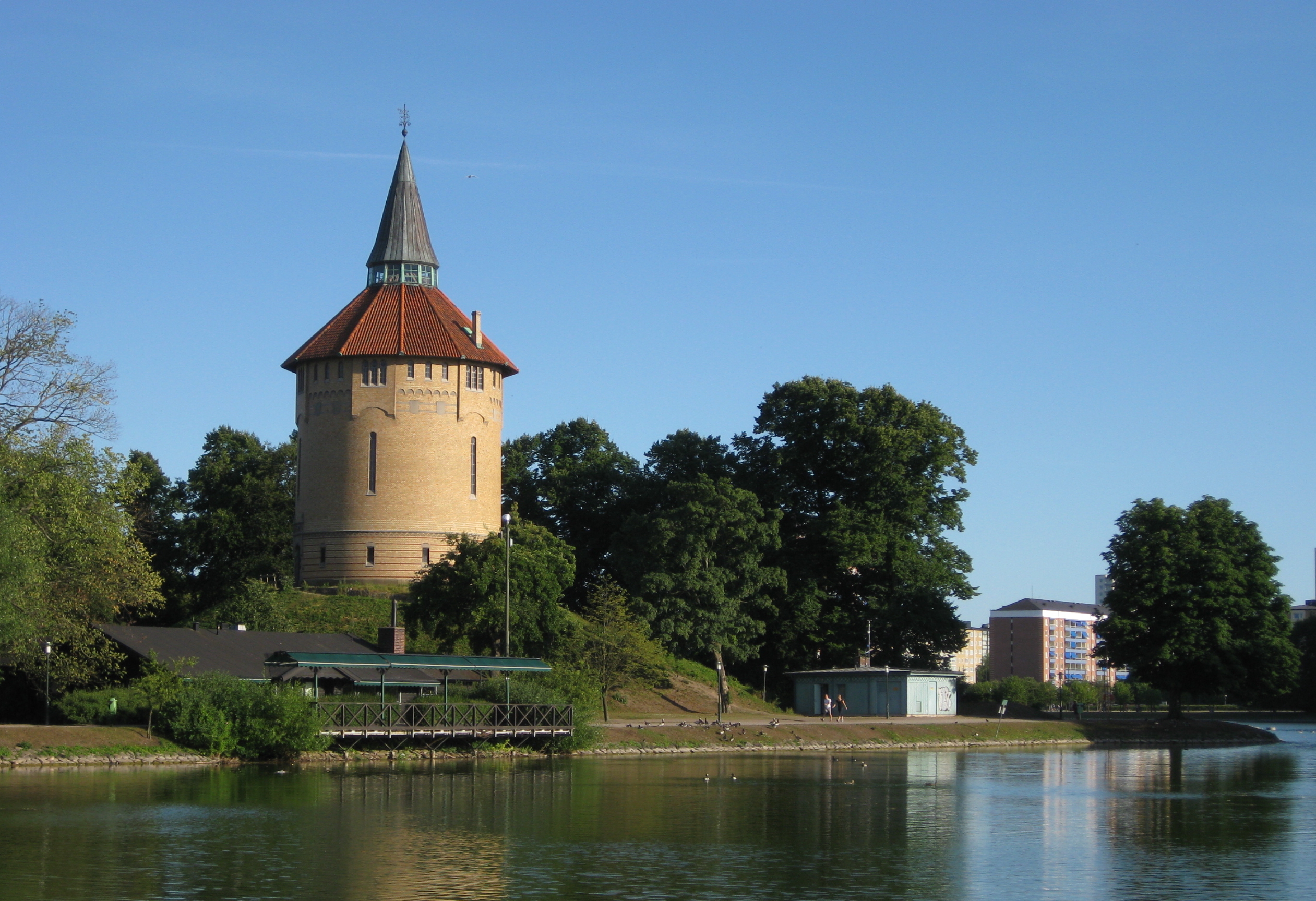
- Interactive map of Pildammsparken
- Coordinates: 55°35′25″N 12°59′32″E
- Country: Sweden
- Province: Skåne
- County: Skåne County
- Municipality: Malmö Municipality

Population (1 January 2011)
  - Total: 0
- Time zone: UTC+1 (CET)
  - Summer (DST): UTC+2 (CEST)

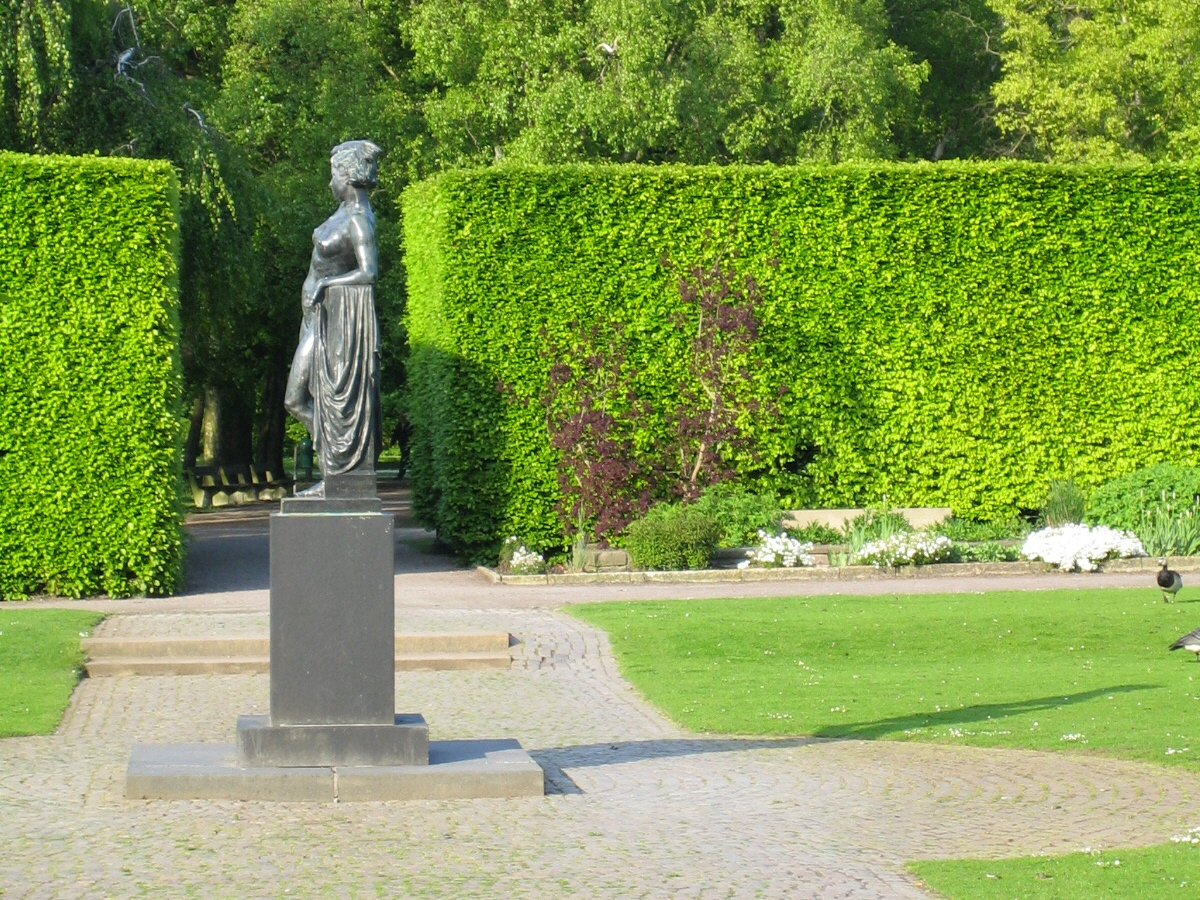
Sculpture Galathea and its grove

Pildammsparken (Willowpond Park) is a neighbourhood and park in Malmö, Sweden, design in a neoclassical style and covering an area of 45 hectates. The park was founded for the Baltic Exhibition of 1914, but its two dams predate it, as a reservoir for the inhabitants of Malmö. The ponds and surrounding parkland provide habitats for fish, insects, and plant life while attracting visitors to the area.

== History ==
Pildammsparken was originally Malmö's water reservoir. Its name, Pildammarna (Willow Ponds or Willow Dams), derives from the willows planted along the protective embankments of the dams to reinforce them. Water from the reservoirs was supplied to public pumps at Stortorget (Great Square), where Malmö residents collected it.

In 1914, the area was selected as the site for the Baltic Exhibition, a grand event showcasing advancements in technology and design. The exhibition area was designed by architect Ferdinand Boberg with assistance from then-Crown Princess Margareta. The event was a major success, attracting nearly a million visitors. Remnants from this time, such as the Margaretapaviljongen (Margareta Pavilion), Blomstergatan (the Flower Street), an old granite fountain, and a fire station, remain in the park today.

Following the exhibition, Danish landscape architect Erstad-Jörgensen proposed a design for the park inspired by English romantic park styles. His plan, characterized by soft lines, expansive lawns, and scattered tree groups, was partially implemented around the smaller dam in 1915.

In 1926, city engineer Bülow-Hübe revised the plan, giving the remaining part of the park a neoclassical and monumental character. He unified the park into a cohesive whole, resulting in a large-scale folk park. Central to the park is Tallriken (The Plate), a circular event space 160 meters in diameter. Over time, various sculptures have been added to the park, including Galathea by Nils Möllerberg, Kastanj (Chestnut) by Bertil Nilsson, and the more contemporary Strykjärn (Flatiron) by Hiroshi Koyama, which has been both celebrated and controversial.

The park underwent significant renovations in 1983–1984, during which the large dam was emptied and cleaned to improve water quality. Lighting installations were also added to enhance evening visits, particularly in Galatheas hage (Galathea's Grove) and along the dam's promenade.

== Features ==
The park is split into four distinct areas: the eastern section contains the central dam and Pildammstornet, the old water tower; the southern section features Margaretapaviljongen (Margareta Pavilion) and Blomstergatan (the Flower Street); the western section, contains a wooded area and Tallriken; the northern section includes Galatheas hage (Galathea's Grove) and the smaller dam.

=== The dams ===
The central dam in Pildammsparken is home to three fountains that create impressive water displays reaching heights of up to 25 meters. Introduced on Walpurgis Night in 1989, these fountains were later enhanced with music and colorful lights in 1999. Light shows occur nightly after sunset, every half hour until 1:00 a.m.

The dams face significant leakage problems, losing approximately 170 million liters of water annually—equivalent to the yearly consumption of 3,300 people. To mitigate this, Malmö municipality fills the ponds with potable water each year. In 2024, the city initiated efforts to locate and address the leaks, employing high-tech equipment such as interferometric sonar and georadar to survey the pond bed. Malmö municipality is exploring solutions, including sealing the pond bed and identifying alternative water sources such as treated wastewater, stormwater, or groundwater.

=== Margaretapaviljongen and Blomstergatan ===
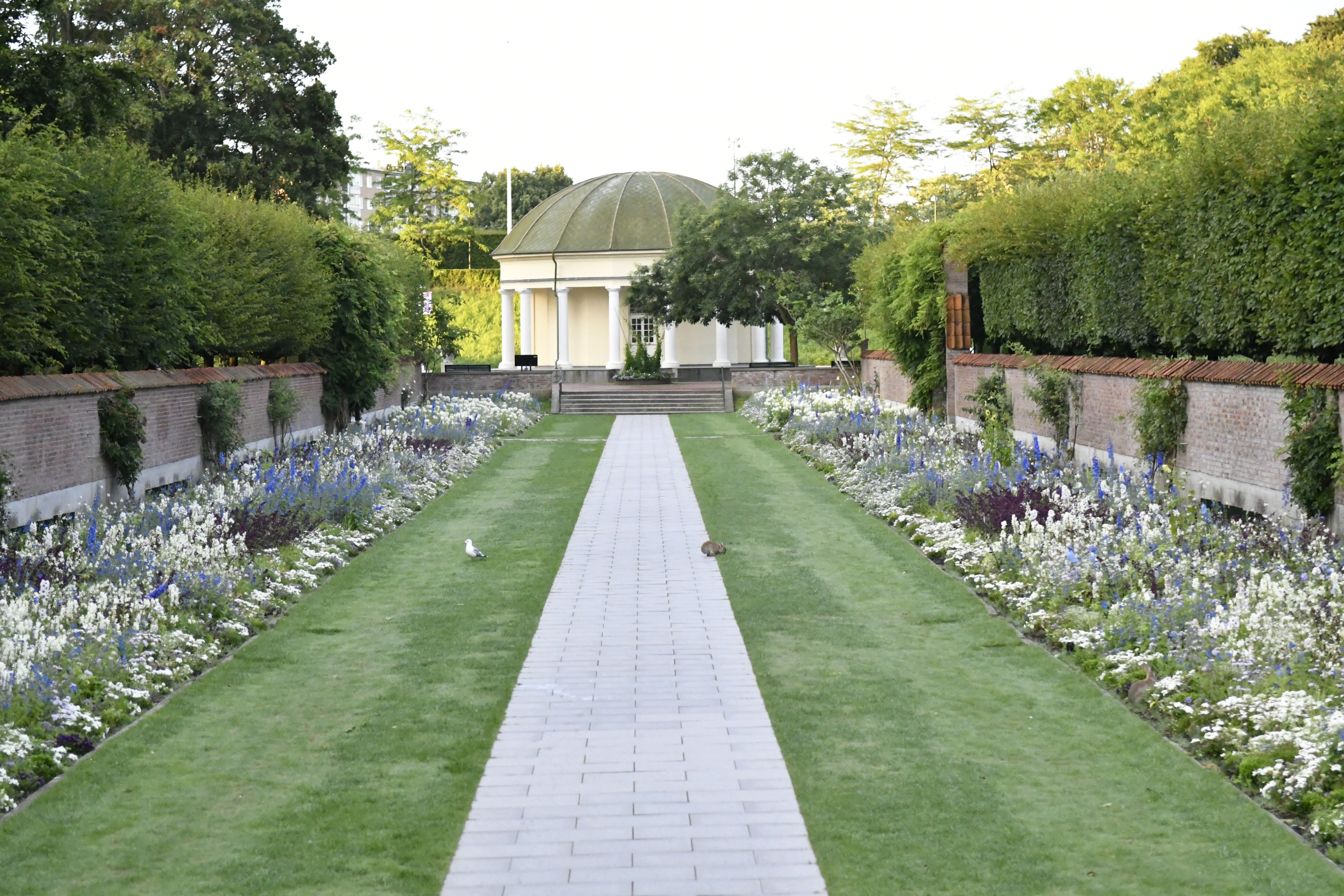
Margaretapaviljonen and Blomstergatan

The Margaretapaviljongen (Margareta Pavilion) and the Blomstergatan (Flower Street) are a legacy of the Baltic Exhibition. They lie on the southern end of the park and consist of a small pavilion and a path leading to it, sidelined by flowers. Blomstergatan was originally designed by Crown Princess Margareta for the Baltic Exhibition, and it has been restored to its original design. The restoration included reconstructing the original brick walls, which store heat and improve the local climate for flowers. Issues such as poor irrigation and excessive pruning have also been addressed, enabling a vibrant display of flowers during spring and summer. A nearby building once housed the Margareta Restaurant, but it has closed and is in poor condition following a fire. As of March 1, 2024, Malmö City owns the building, and its future is under review.

Pildammsparken features two themed playgrounds: Spindellekplatsen (Spider Playground) and Teaterlekplatsen (Theater Playground). Additionally, the park offers two outdoor gyms, one near the old water tower and another in the southeastern woodland area.
