= Nilsson =

Nilsson is a Swedish surname and the fourth most common surname in Sweden. The name is a patronymic meaning "Nils's son". Nils was a very common name, especially in 19th century Sweden.

== People with the surname ==
- Agneta Nilsson (born 1956), Swedish politician
- Anders Nilsson (disambiguation)
- Andreas Nilsson (disambiguation)
- Anna Q. Nilsson (1888–1974), Swedish actor
- Anna T. Nilsson (1869–1947), Swedish educator and peace activist
- Aurora Nilsson (1894–1972), Swedish writer
- Bengt Nilsson (born 1954), Swedish actor
- Birgit Nilsson (1918–2005), Swedish soprano
- Bo Nilsson (1937–2018) Swedish composer and lyricist
- Bob Nilsson (born 1960), Australian minor league and ABL pitcher
- Cecilia Nilsson (born 1979), Swedish hammer thrower
- Christina Nilsson (1843–1921), Swedish operatic soprano
- Christina Nilsson (soprano, born 1990), Swedish operatic soprano
- Dave Nilsson (born 1969), Australian professional baseball player, coach, manager
- Ebba Tove Elsa Nilsson (born 1987) Swedish singer, songwriter known as Tove Lo
- Elin Nilsson (born 1982), Swedish politician
- Elisabeth Nilsson (lawyer), Swedish lawyer and suffragist (1878–1941)
- Elisabeth Nilsson (civil servant), Swedish civil servant and businesswoman (1953–)
- Felix Nilsson (born 2005), Swedish ice hockey player
- Fredrik Olaus Nilsson (1809–1881), Swedish Baptist pioneer
- Gary Nilsson (born 1963), Australian minor league and ABL pitcher
- Gunnar Nilsson (1948–1978), Swedish racing car driver
- Gustaf Nilsson (footballer, born 1922) (1922–2004), Swedish football player
- Gustaf Nilsson (footballer, born 1997) (born 1997), Swedish football player
- Gustaf Nilsson (wrestler) (1899–1980), Swedish wrestler
- Harry Nilsson (1941–1994), American singer and songwriter, often known simply as Nilsson
- Ida Göthilda Nilsson (1840–1920), Swedish sculptor
- Ida Nilsson (born 1981), Swedish trailrunner and ski mountaineer
- Ingemar Nilsson (born 1956), Swedish politician
- Janne Nilsson (1882–1938), Swedish politician
- Jesse Nilsson (1977–2003), Canadian actor
- Joakim Nilsson (disambiguation)
- Jonna Emily Lee Nilsson (born 1981), Swedish singer
- Kent Nilsson (born 1956), Swedish ice hockey player
- Kirsten Nilsson (1931–2017), German cabaret performer and sex worker
- Kjell Nilsson (disambiguation)
- Kristina Nilsson (born 1965), Swedish politician
- Lasse Nilsson or Lars Nilsson, multiple people
- Lennart Nilsson (1922–2017), Swedish photographer
- Lennart Nilsson (born 1944), Swedish politician
- Leopoldo Torre Nilsson (1924–1978), Argentine film director
- Liam Dower Nilsson (born 2003), Swedish ice hockey player
- Lina Nilsson, Swedish football player
- Malin Nilsson (born 1973), Swedish freestyle swimmer
- Magnus Nilsson (born 1984), Swedish chef
- Martin P. Nilsson (1874–1967), Swedish philologist and historian of religion
- Mats Nilsson (born 1956), Swedish Air Force officer
- Max Nilsson (born 1980), Swedish racing driver
- Molly Nilsson (born 1984), Swedish singer-songwriter and musician
- Nils Nilsson (disambiguation)
- Noah Dower Nilsson (born 2005), Swedish ice hockey player
- Norma Jean Nilsson (born 1938), American actress
- Pål Nils Nilsson (1929–2002), Swedish photographer and filmmaker
- Robert Nilsson (born 1985), Swedish ice hockey player
- Roland Nilsson (born 1963), Swedish football player
- Svante Nilsson (1460–1512), a regent of Sweden
- Sven Nilsson (disambiguation)
- Thomas Nilsson (born 1963), Swedish Air Force officer
- Tommy Nilsson (born 1960), Swedish musician
- Ulf Nilsson (1948–2021), Swedish writer
- Ulrik Nilsson (born 1963), Swedish politician
- Ulrika Nilsson (born 1965), Swedish journalist
- Zandor Nilsson (1913–1973), Swedish chess player

== See also ==
- Neilson (name)
