= Elisabeth Nilsson =

Elisabeth Nilsson may refer to:

- Elisabeth Nilsson (lawyer), Swedish lawyer and suffragist (1878–1941)
- Elisabeth Nilsson (civil servant), Swedish civil servant and businesswoman (1953–)

== See also ==
- Nilsson (surname)
