= Malmö =

City in Skåne County, Sweden

- City
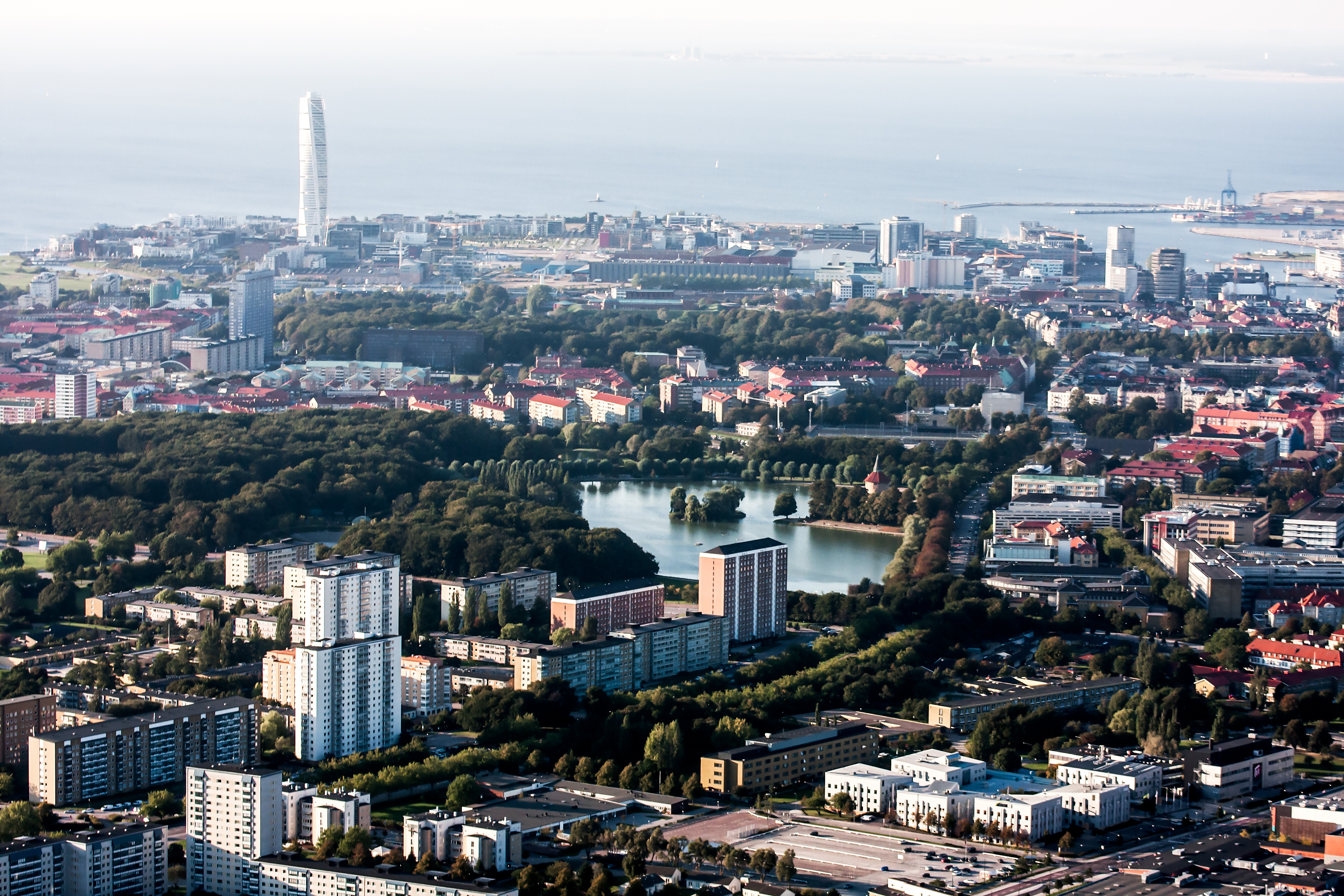
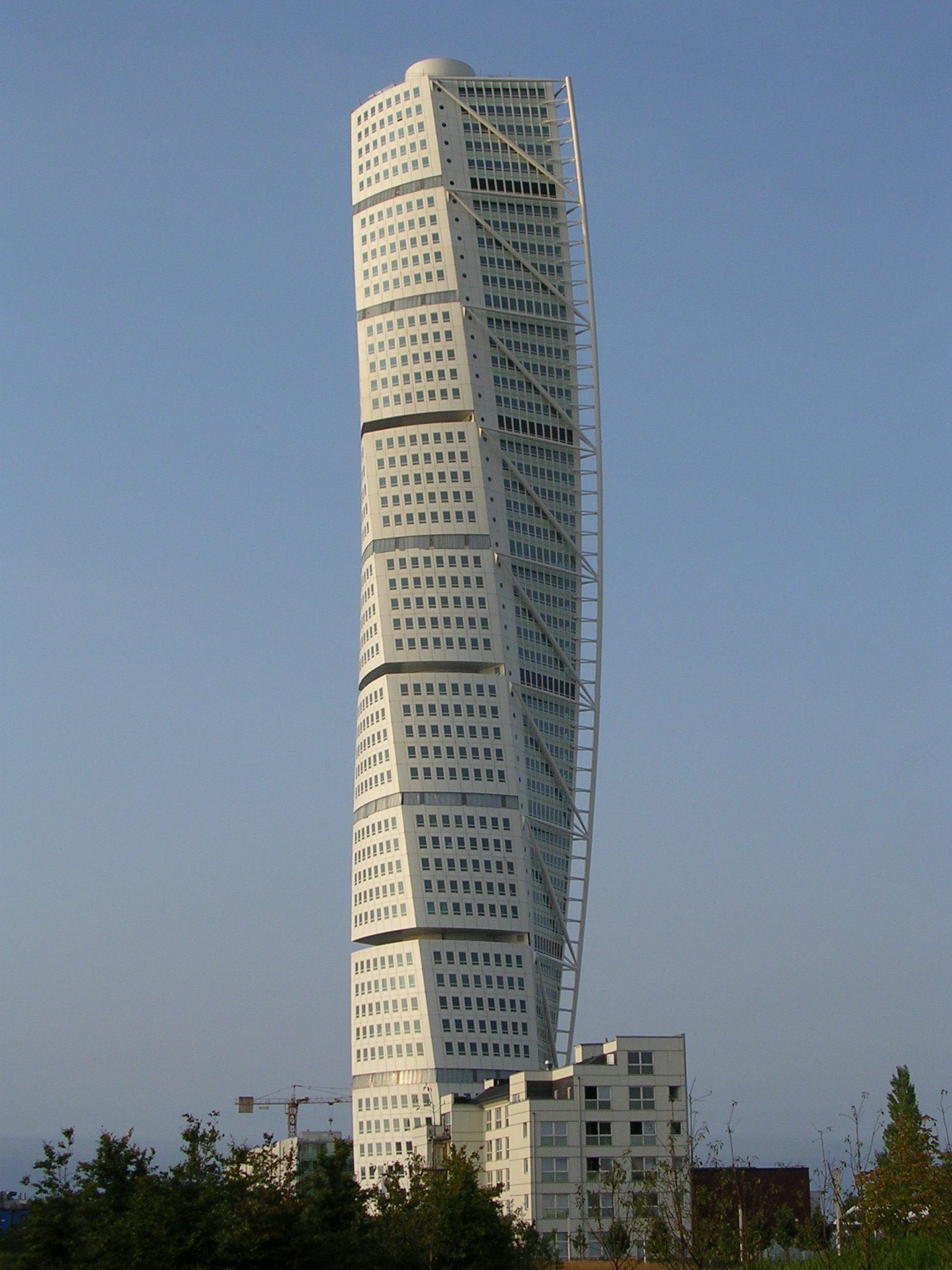
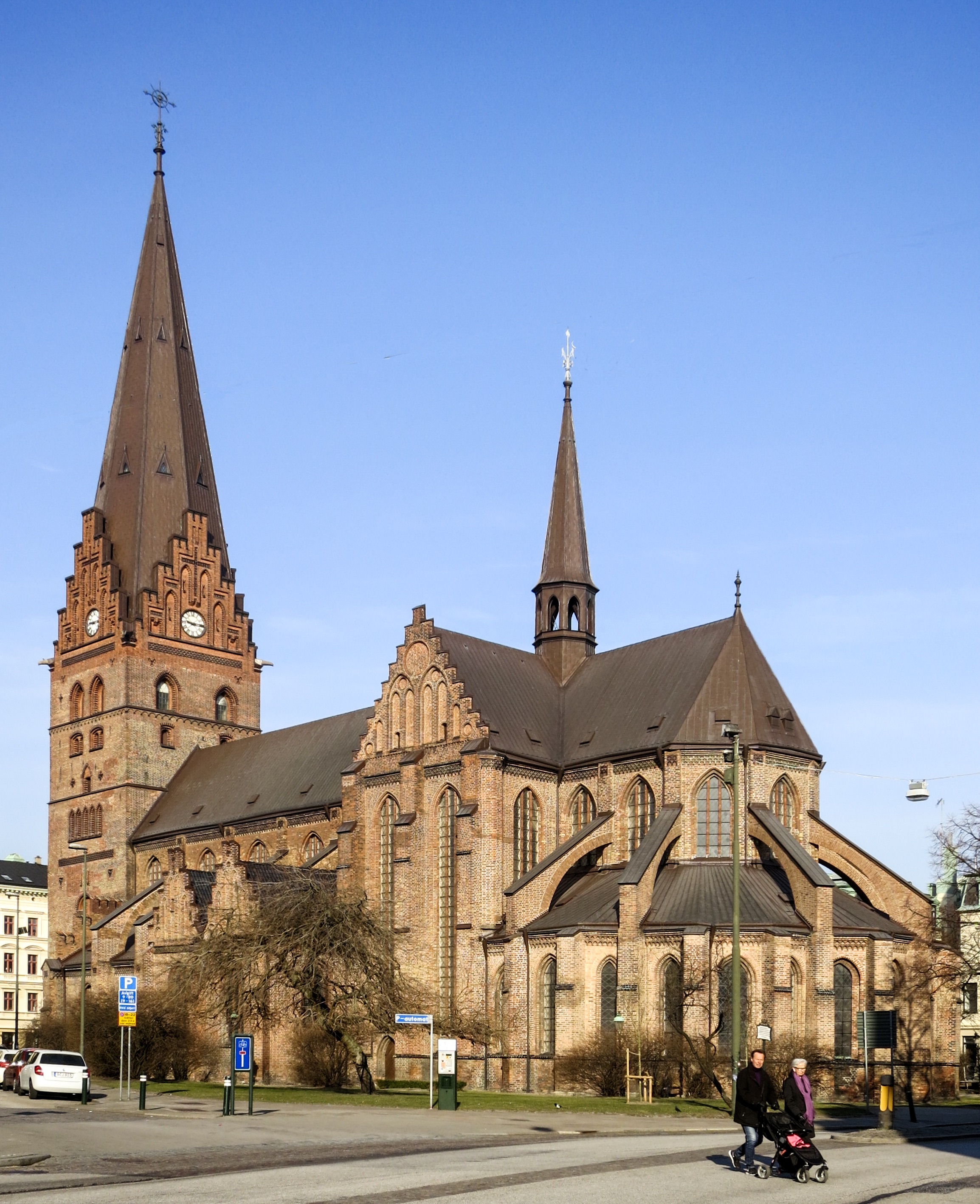
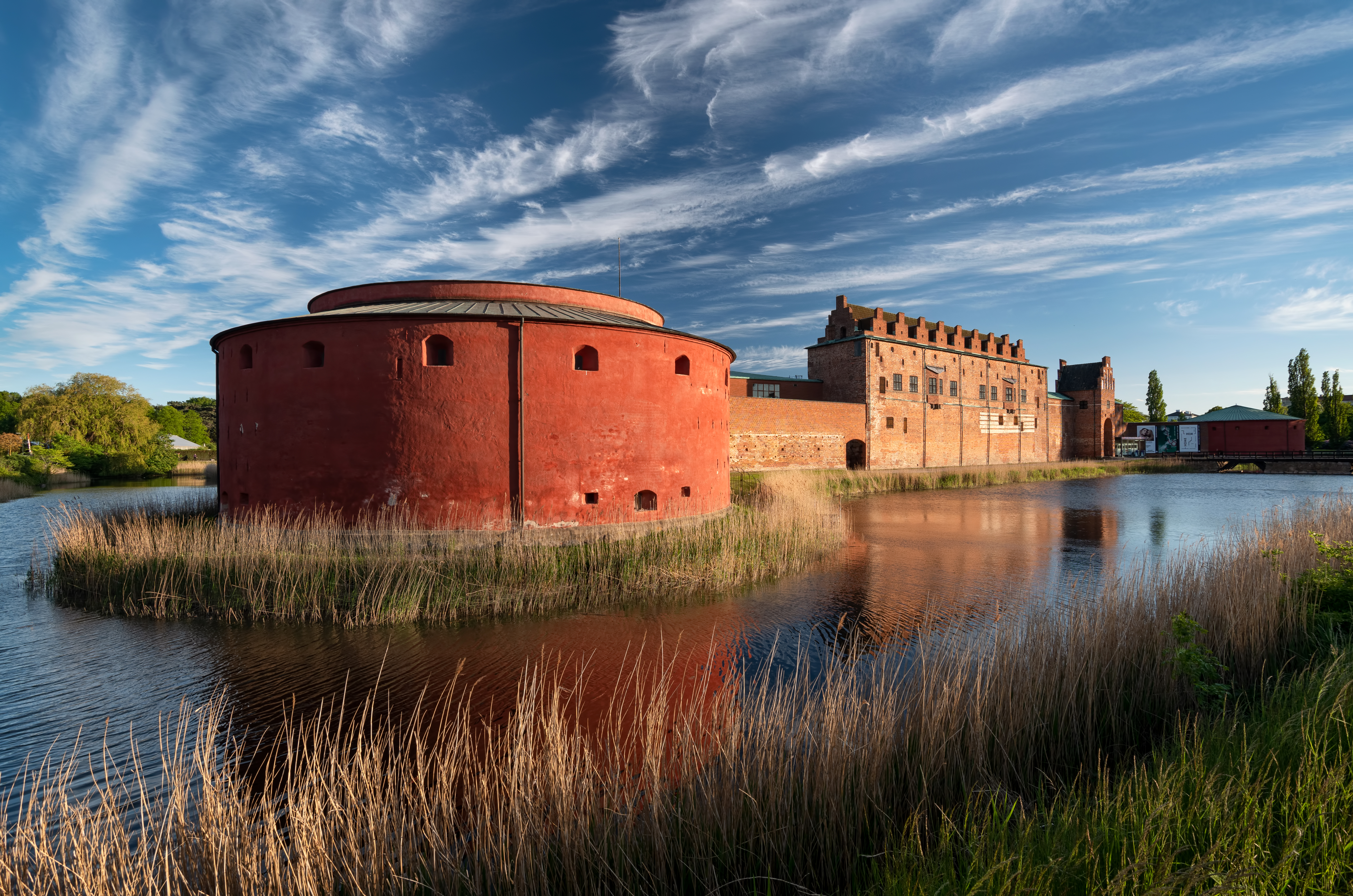
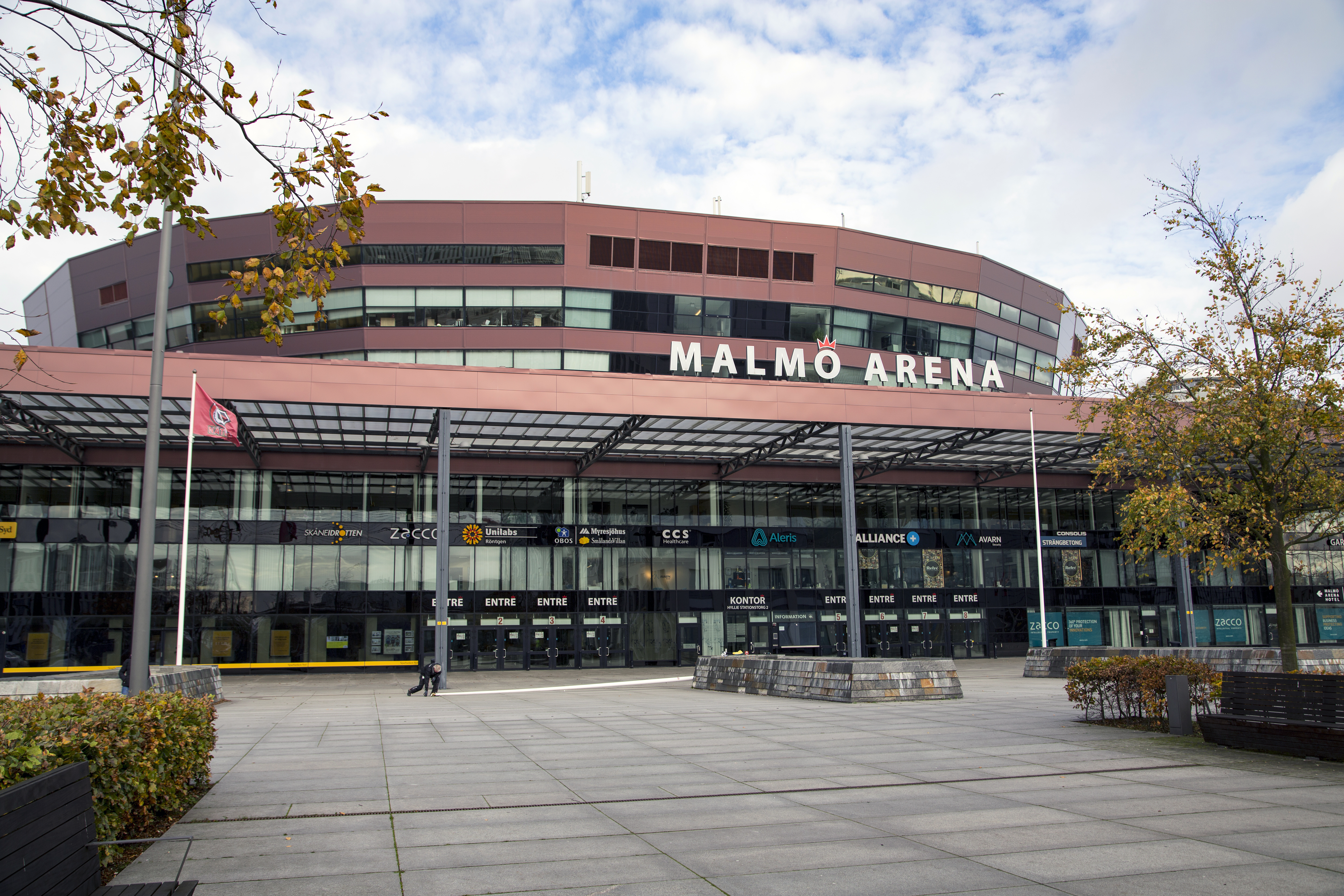
- Aerial view of Malmö Turning Torso St. Peter's Church Malmö Castle Malmö Arena

- Flag Coat of arms
- Motto(s): Mångfald, Möten, Möjligheter ("Diversity, Meetings, Possibilities")
- Location within Skåne Location within Sweden
- Coordinates: 55°36′17.364″N 13°0′18.25″E
- Country: Sweden
- Province: Scania
- County: Skåne County
- Municipality: Malmö Municipality and Burlöv Municipality
- Charter: 13th century

Government
  - Chair of the City Administration: Katrin Stjernfeldt Jammeh (S)

Area
  - City: 332.6 km^{2} (128.4 sq mi)
  - Land: 156.9 km^{2} (60.6 sq mi)
  - Water: 175.8 km^{2} (67.9 sq mi)
  - Metro: 2,522 km^{2} (974 sq mi)
- Elevation: 12 m (39 ft)

Population (2025)
  - City: 368,135
  - Rank: 3rd
  - Density: 4,049/km^{2} (10,490/sq mi)
  - Metro: 780,035
  - Municipality: 368,135
- Demonym: Malmöite
- Time zone: UTC+1 (CET)
  - Summer (DST): UTC+2 (CEST)
- Postal code: 2xx xx
- Area code: (+46) 40
- Website: www.malmo.se

Malmö (Note: Pronounced /ˈmælmoʊ/, UK also /-mɜː/; Swedish: Malmö, pronounced [ˈmâlːmøː]; Danish: Malmø, pronounced [ˈmælmˌøˀ].) is the third-largest city in Sweden, after Stockholm and Gothenburg, and the seventh-largest city in the Nordic region. Located on the Öresund strait on the southwestern coast of Sweden, it is the largest city in Scania, with a municipal population of 365,644 in 2024, and is the gubernatorial seat of Skåne County. Malmö received its city privileges in 1353; today, Malmö's metropolitan region is home to over 700,000 people.

Malmö is the site of Sweden's only fixed direct link to continental Europe, the Öresund Bridge, completed in 2000. The bridge connects Sweden to Denmark, and carries both road and rail traffic. The Öresund Region, which includes Malmö and Copenhagen, is home to four million people.

The city was one of the earliest and most-industrialised in Scandinavia, and the birthplace of several of Scandinavia's largest industrial groups, such as Kockums, Skanska, and Scania AB. The city has undergone a major transformation in the 21st century; today, Malmö is characterised by many small and medium-sized companies in biotech, logistics, IT, construction, and real estate markets. It also is home to Malmö University and other higher education facilities.

Malmö contains many historic buildings and parks, and is a commercial centre for the western part of Scania. It is home to Malmö FF, the Swedish football club with the most Allsvenskan titles, and the only Nordic club to have reached the final of the European Cup. It is also home to women's football club FC Rosengård, the most successful club in the Damallsvenskan.

The city was Sweden's fastest-growing in 2020, and the population increased by 3,800 inhabitants during 2021. As of 2024, almost half the municipal population of Malmö had a foreign background with the city being home to people from 187 different countries. Malmö's population is expected to increase by about 29,000 new residents by 2035 with a total 395,000 residents, and a population of 500,000 by 2050.

Malmö has a mild climate for its latitude and, normally, average high temperatures remain above freezing in winter, with prolonged snow cover being rare.

== History ==
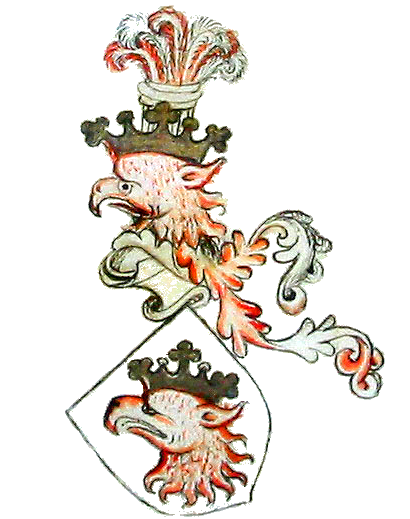
Malmö's 1437 grant of arms

=== 1275–1658 (Denmark) ===
The earliest written mention of Malmö as a city dates from 1275. It is thought to have been founded shortly before that date, as a fortified quay or ferry berth of the Danish Archbishop of Lund, 20 kilometres (12 miles) to the north-east. Its original name was Malmhaug (with alternative spellings), meaning "Gravel pile" or "Ore Hill".

In the 15th century, Malmö became one of Denmark's largest and most visited cities, reaching a population of approximately 5,000 inhabitants. It became the most important city around the Öresund, with the German Hanseatic League frequenting it as a marketplace, and was notable for its flourishing herring fishery. In 1437, King Erik of Pomerania (King of Denmark from 1396 to 1439) granted the city's arms: argent with a griffin gules, based on Eric's arms from Pomerania. The griffin's head as a symbol of Malmö extended to the entire province of Skåne from 1660.

In 1434, a new citadel was constructed at the beach south of the town. This fortress, known today as Malmöhus, did not take its current form until the mid-16th century. Several other fortifications were constructed, making Malmö Sweden's most fortified city, but only Malmöhus remains.

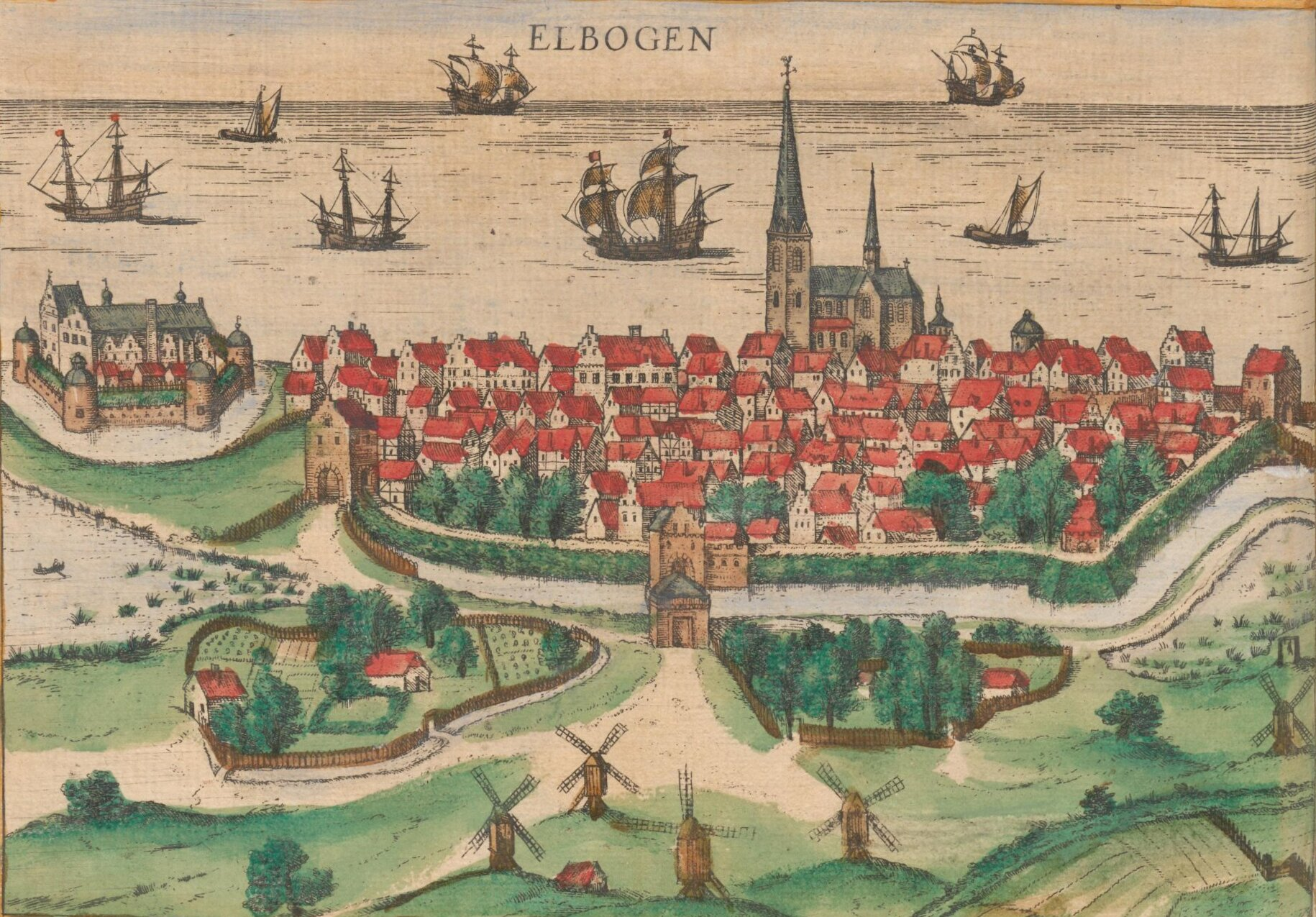
Malmö in 1594: Malmö Castle can be seen at far left, Sankt Petri Church's tower at centre.

Lutheran teachings spread during the 16th century Protestant Reformation, and Malmö became one of the first cities in Scandinavia to fully convert (1527–1529) to this Protestant denomination.

=== 1658 onwards (Sweden) ===
In the 17th century, Malmö and the Skåneland region came under control of Sweden following the Treaty of Roskilde with Denmark, signed in 1658. Fighting continued, however; in June 1677, 14,000 Danish troops laid siege to Malmö for a month, but were unable to defeat the Swedish troops holding it.

By the dawn of the 18th century, Malmö had about 3,000 inhabitants. However, owing to the wars of Charles XII of Sweden (reigned 1697–1718) and to bubonic plague epidemics, the population dropped to 1,800 by 1727. The population did not grow much until the modern harbour was constructed in 1775. The city started to expand and the population in 1800 was 4,000. 15 years later, it had increased to 6,000.

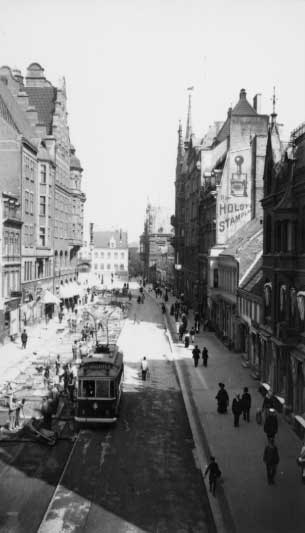
Södergatan in 1913

In 1840, Frans Henrik Kockum founded the workshop from which the Kockums shipyard eventually developed as one of the largest shipyards in the world. The Southern Main Line was built between 1856 and 1864; this enabled Malmö to become a centre of manufacture, with major textile and mechanical industries. In 1870, Malmö overtook Norrköping to become Sweden's third-most populous city, and by 1900 Malmö had strengthened this position with 60,000 inhabitants. Malmö continued to grow through the first half of the 20th century. The population had swiftly increased to 100,000 by 1915 and to 200,000 by 1952.

=== 1900–1969 ===
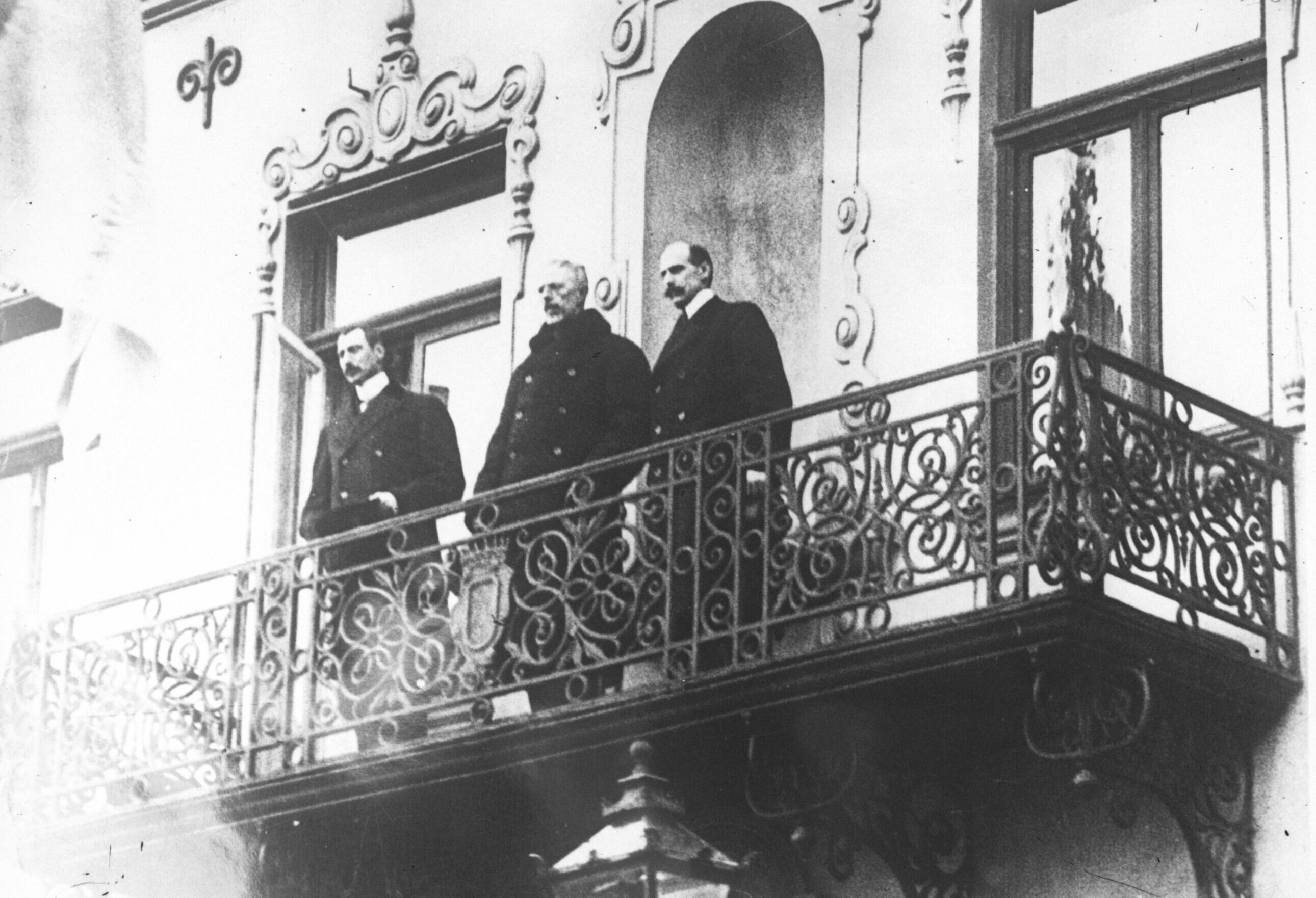
Malmö, 18 December 1914. All three kings of the Scandinavian countries, on the same balcony.

In 1914 (15 May to 4 October), Malmö hosted the Baltic Exhibition. The large park Pildammsparken was arranged and planted for this large event. The Russian part of the exhibition was never taken down, owing to the outbreak of World War I.

On 18 and 19 December 1914, the Three Kings Meeting was held in Malmö. After a somewhat disturbed period (1905–1914), which included the dissolution of the Swedish-Norwegian Union, King Oscar II was replaced with King Håkon VII in Norway, who was the younger brother of the Danish King Christian X. As Oscar died in 1907, and his son Gustav V became the new King of Sweden, the tensions within Scandinavia were still unresolved, but during this historical meeting, the Scandinavian Kings found internal understanding, as well as a common line about remaining neutral in the ongoing war.

Within sports, Malmö has mostly been associated with football. IFK Malmö participated in the first edition of Allsvenskan in 1924–25, but from the mid-1940s Malmö FF started to rise, and ever since it has been one of the most prominent clubs within Swedish football. They have finished first in Allsvenskan (series winners) (Note: Between 1982–1990 the Swedish champions were decided by post-season play-offs, and in 1991–1992 via a Mästerskapsserie, so finishing first in Allsvenskan did not automatically confer the Swedish championship. "Sverige har i 100 år utvecklats och gått framåt tillsammans med Allsvenskan i fotboll" (in Swedish). Svensk Elitfotboll. 29 July 2024. "Svenska mästare 1896–" (in Swedish). Svenska Fotbollförbundet.) a record 27 times and have been crowned Swedish champions a record 24 times (most recently in 2024).

=== 1970–1999 ===
By 1971, Malmö's population reached 265,000 inhabitants, but this was the peak which would stand for more than 30 years. (Svedala was, for a few years in the early 1970s, a part of Malmö municipality.)

By the mid-1970s Sweden experienced a recession that hit the industrial sector especially hard; shipyards and manufacturing industries suffered, which led to high unemployment in many cities of Skåne. Kockums shipyard had become a symbol of Malmö as its largest employer and, when shipbuilding ceased in 1986, confidence in the future of Malmö plummeted among politicians and the public. In addition, many middle-class families moved into one-family houses in surrounding municipalities such as Vellinge Municipality, Lomma Municipality and Staffanstorp Municipality, which profiled themselves as the suburbs of the upper-middle class. By 1985, Malmö had lost 37,000 inhabitants and the population was down to 225,500.

The Swedish financial crises of the early 1990s exacerbated Malmö's decline as an industrial city; between 1990 and 1995 Malmö lost about 27,000 jobs and its economy was seriously strained. In 1994, the city had a financial deficit of 1.3 billion Swedish krona (SEK), the highest financial deficit ever by any municipality in Sweden. However, from 1994 under the leadership of the then mayor Ilmar Reepalu, the city of Malmö started to create a new economy as a centre of culture and knowledge. Malmö reached bottom in 1995, but that same year marked the commencement of the massive Öresund Bridge road, railway and tunnel project, connecting it to Copenhagen and to the rail lines of Europe. The new Malmö University opened in 1998 on Kockums' former dockside.

=== 2000s and later ===
Further redevelopment of the now disused south-western harbour followed; a city architecture exposition (Bo01) was held in the area in 2001, and its buildings and villas form the core of a new city district. Designed with attractive waterfront vistas, it was intended to attract, and has been successful in attracting, the urban middle-class.

Since 1974, the Kockums Crane had been a landmark in Malmö and a symbol of the city's manufacturing industry, but in 2002 it was disassembled and moved to South Korea. In 2005, Malmö gained a new landmark with completion of Turning Torso, the tallest skyscraper in Scandinavia. Although the transformation from a city with its economic base in manufacturing has returned growth to Malmö, the new types of jobs have largely benefited the middle and upper classes.

In its 2015 and 2017 reports, Police in Sweden placed the Rosengård and the Södra Sofielund/Seved district in the most severe category of urban areas with high crime rates. In 2023, however, the situation in Södra Sofielund/Seved was deemed as improving, and it was re-categorised to being a Vulnerable area, the less severe category.

Malmö is currently growing fast and detailed work is being planned near the Malmö Central Station, in a district called Nyhamnen. Nyhamnen will provide 9,000 new housings, two larger buildings for offices and courts. It is expected to be complete around 2040–2050.

The Middle Eastern crisis (2023–present) has had an impact in Malmö, which has a large population with roots in the region. Following the 2023 Hamas-led attack on Israel, public celebrations were reported in Malmö, leading to the suspension of cooperation between the Jewish community and the Islamic Academy. During Eurovision 2024, which was held in Malmö, demonstrations were held in the city against Israel's participation. SVT reported in 2024 that Palestinian flags had become more prominent in the cityscape, and a roundabout in Möllevången, previously nicknamed "the drug roundabout," has been renamed by some locals as the "Gaza Roundabout."

== Geography ==
Malmö is located at 13°00' east and 55°35' north, near the southwestern tip of Sweden, in Skåne County.

The city is part of the transnational Öresund Region and, since 2000, has been linked by the Öresund Bridge across the Öresund to Copenhagen, Denmark. The bridge opened on 1 July 2000, and measures 8 kilometres (5 miles) (the whole link totalling 16 km), with pylons reaching 204.5 metres (670.9 feet) vertically. Apart from the Helsingborg-Helsingør ferry links further north, most ferry connections have been discontinued.

=== Climate ===
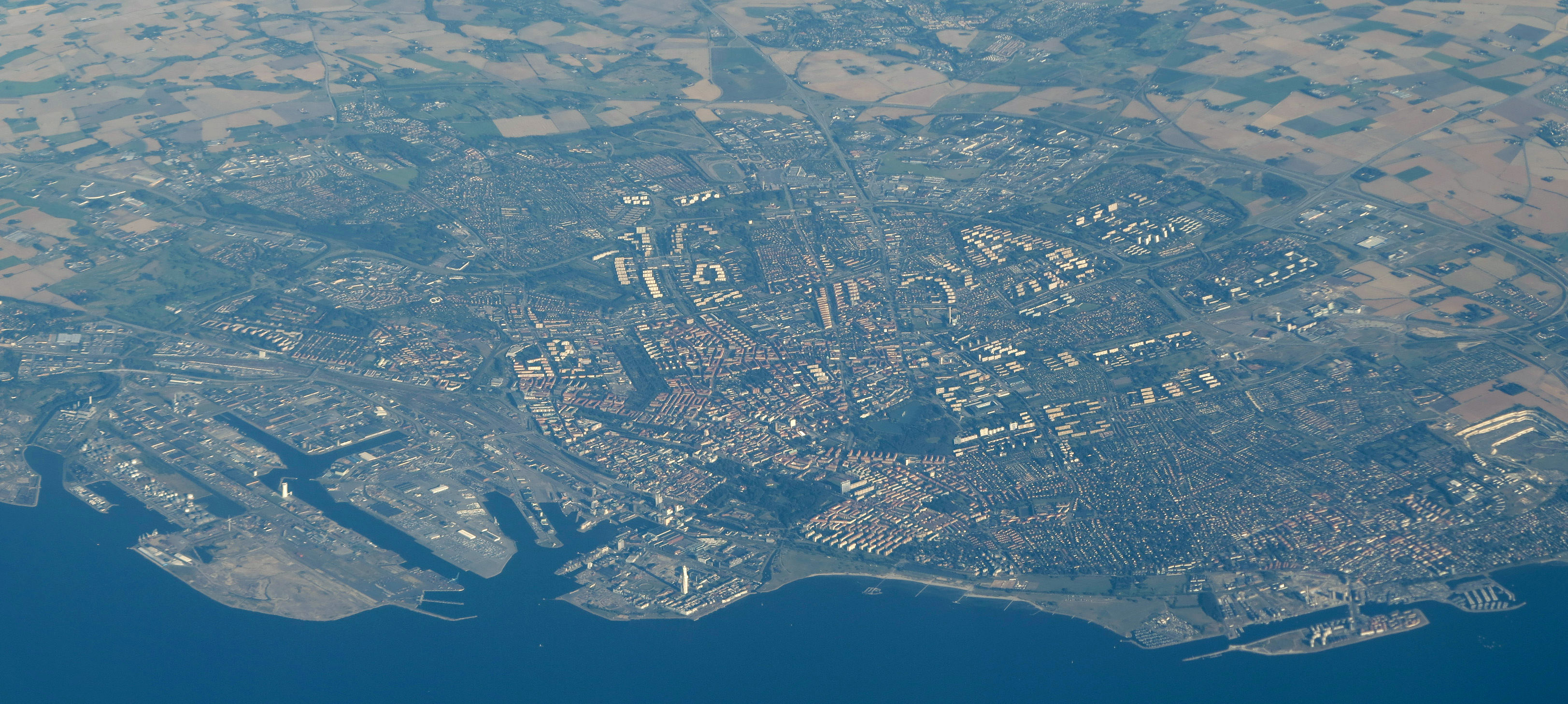
A view of Malmö from a plane window, August 2015

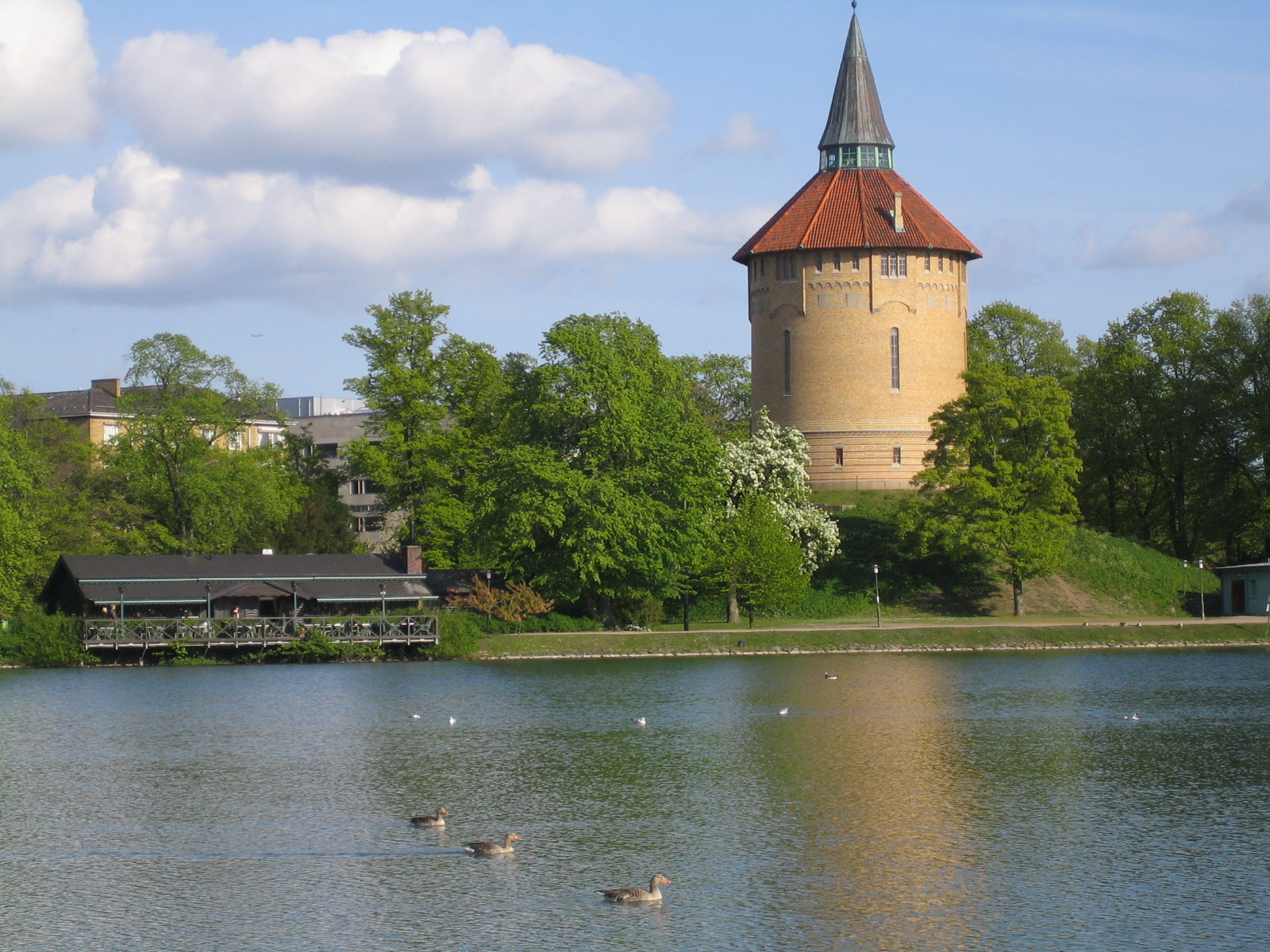
Pildammsparken with the old water tower

Malmö, like the rest of southern Sweden, has an oceanic climate (Cfb). Despite its northern location, the climate is mild compared to other locations at similar latitudes, mainly because of the influence of the Gulf Stream and also its westerly position on the Eurasian landmass. Owing to its northern latitude, daylight lasts 17 hours 31 minutes in midsummer, but only around seven hours in midwinter. According to data from 2002 to 2014 Falsterbo, to the south of the city, received an annual average of 1,895 hours of sunshine while Lund, to the north, received 1,803 hours. The sunshine data in the weather box is based on the data for Falsterbo.

Summers are mild with average high temperatures of 20 to 23 °C (68 to 73 °F) and lows of around 11 to 13 °C (52 to 55 °F). Heat waves during the summer arise occasionally. Winters are fairly cold and windy, with temperatures steady between −3 and 4 °C (27 and 39 °F), but it rarely drops below −10 °C (14 °F).

Rainfall is light to moderate throughout the year with 169 wet days. Snowfall occurs mainly in December through March, but snow covers do not remain for a long time, and some winters are free of snow.

Climate data for Malmö, 1991–2018; extremes since 1901
Month	Jan	Feb	Mar	Apr	May	Jun	Jul	Aug	Sep	Oct	Nov	Dec	Year
Record high °C (°F)	10.8 (51.4)	14.1 (57.4)	19.5 (67.1)	26.2 (79.2)	29.6 (85.3)	35.1 (95.2)	33.2 (91.8)	33.6 (92.5)	29.4 (84.9)	22.8 (73.0)	17.4 (63.3)	11.9 (53.4)	35.1 (95.2)
Mean maximum °C (°F)	8.0 (46.4)	7.7 (45.9)	13.8 (56.8)	19.2 (66.6)	24.6 (76.3)	26.9 (80.4)	29.2 (84.6)	28.2 (82.8)	23.7 (74.7)	17.8 (64.0)	12.5 (54.5)	9.2 (48.6)	29.9 (85.8)
Mean daily maximum °C (°F)	2.9 (37.2)	3.0 (37.4)	6.7 (44.1)	12.6 (54.7)	17.6 (63.7)	20.5 (68.9)	23.2 (73.8)	22.3 (72.1)	18.6 (65.5)	12.6 (54.7)	8.0 (46.4)	4.8 (40.6)	12.7 (54.9)
Daily mean °C (°F)	0.8 (33.4)	0.8 (33.4)	3.4 (38.1)	8.0 (46.4)	12.7 (54.9)	15.9 (60.6)	18.5 (65.3)	18.0 (64.4)	14.7 (58.5)	9.5 (49.1)	5.8 (42.4)	2.8 (37.0)	9.2 (48.6)
Mean daily minimum °C (°F)	−1.4 (29.5)	−1.5 (29.3)	0.0 (32.0)	3.4 (38.1)	7.7 (45.9)	11.2 (52.2)	13.8 (56.8)	13.7 (56.7)	10.7 (51.3)	6.4 (43.5)	3.6 (38.5)	0.7 (33.3)	5.7 (42.3)
Mean minimum °C (°F)	−11.1 (12.0)	−8.6 (16.5)	−7.1 (19.2)	−2.9 (26.8)	1.0 (33.8)	5.8 (42.4)	9.4 (48.9)	8.0 (46.4)	3.3 (37.9)	−2.1 (28.2)	−4.4 (24.1)	−7.7 (18.1)	−13.4 (7.9)
Record low °C (°F)	−28.0 (−18.4)	−23.1 (−9.6)	−23.3 (−9.9)	−12.1 (10.2)	−4.5 (23.9)	−0.1 (31.8)	2.5 (36.5)	3.0 (37.4)	−4.0 (24.8)	−8.5 (16.7)	−15.0 (5.0)	−22.2 (−8.0)	−28.0 (−18.4)
Average precipitation mm (inches)	58.0 (2.28)	39.7 (1.56)	38.5 (1.52)	30.0 (1.18)	39.9 (1.57)	67.3 (2.65)	71.1 (2.80)	86.3 (3.40)	42.3 (1.67)	66.7 (2.63)	64.2 (2.53)	69.4 (2.73)	673.2 (26.50)
Average relative humidity (%)	87.3	85.6	81.3	74.7	72.9	73.0	74.6	77.2	80.5	84.9	87.5	88.6	80.7
Mean monthly sunshine hours	43.6	64.4	138.9	222.9	274.4	271.5	272.1	236.0	188.1	115.9	56.8	33.1	1,917.7
Source 1: SMHI Open Data
Source 2: SMHI Average Data 2002–2018, Weather.Directory

Climate data for Malmö Airport (1991–2020)
Month	Jan	Feb	Mar	Apr	May	Jun	Jul	Aug	Sep	Oct	Nov	Dec	Year
Mean daily maximum °C (°F)	3.2 (37.8)	3.5 (38.3)	6.6 (43.9)	12.3 (54.1)	17.1 (62.8)	20.2 (68.4)	22.7 (72.9)	22.3 (72.1)	18.0 (64.4)	12.5 (54.5)	7.6 (45.7)	4.5 (40.1)	12.5 (54.5)
Daily mean °C (°F)	1.2 (34.2)	1.2 (34.2)	3.3 (37.9)	7.7 (45.9)	12.3 (54.1)	15.7 (60.3)	18.2 (64.8)	17.9 (64.2)	14.2 (57.6)	9.5 (49.1)	5.5 (41.9)	2.6 (36.7)	9.1 (48.4)
Mean daily minimum °C (°F)	−1.0 (30.2)	−0.9 (30.4)	0.3 (32.5)	3.5 (38.3)	7.6 (45.7)	11.3 (52.3)	13.7 (56.7)	13.7 (56.7)	10.6 (51.1)	6.7 (44.1)	3.4 (38.1)	0.5 (32.9)	5.8 (42.4)
Average precipitation mm (inches)	55.6 (2.19)	42.4 (1.67)	40.9 (1.61)	33.6 (1.32)	41.1 (1.62)	64.0 (2.52)	62.0 (2.44)	72.8 (2.87)	55.9 (2.20)	64.5 (2.54)	59.5 (2.34)	65.8 (2.59)	658.1 (25.91)
Average precipitation days (≥ 1.0 mm)	10.5	8.7	8.3	6.3	7.6	9.1	8.5	10.2	8.2	10.6	11.1	12.4	111.5
Source: NOAA,

Climate data for Malmö 2002–2021
Month	Jan	Feb	Mar	Apr	May	Jun	Jul	Aug	Sep	Oct	Nov	Dec	Year
Mean daily maximum °C (°F)	4.3 (39.7)	4.3 (39.7)	7.2 (45.0)	12.0 (53.6)	17.2 (63.0)	20.4 (68.7)	22.9 (73.2)	22.4 (72.3)	17.9 (64.2)	13.6 (56.5)	8.6 (47.5)	5.2 (41.4)	13.0 (55.4)
Daily mean °C (°F)	1.7 (35.1)	1.7 (35.1)	3.9 (39.0)	7.7 (45.9)	12.5 (54.5)	16.0 (60.8)	18.3 (64.9)	18.2 (64.8)	14.2 (57.6)	10.4 (50.7)	6.0 (42.8)	2.7 (36.9)	9.4 (49.0)
Mean daily minimum °C (°F)	−0.4 (31.3)	−0.4 (31.3)	1.0 (33.8)	3.7 (38.7)	8.1 (46.6)	11.9 (53.4)	14.1 (57.4)	14.3 (57.7)	10.8 (51.4)	7.7 (45.9)	4.0 (39.2)	0.7 (33.3)	6.3 (43.3)
Source 1: SMHI Open Data
Source 2: SMHI Average Data 2002–2019

== Transport ==
=== Air ===
Malmö Airport, also known as Sturup Airport, is located approximately 28 kilometres (17 mi) east of central Malmö in Svedala Municipality. It primarily serves domestic routes, charter flights, and low-cost carriers.

For international travel, Copenhagen Airport is more commonly used and is accessible from Malmö Central Station by train in approximately 20 minutes.

=== Rail ===
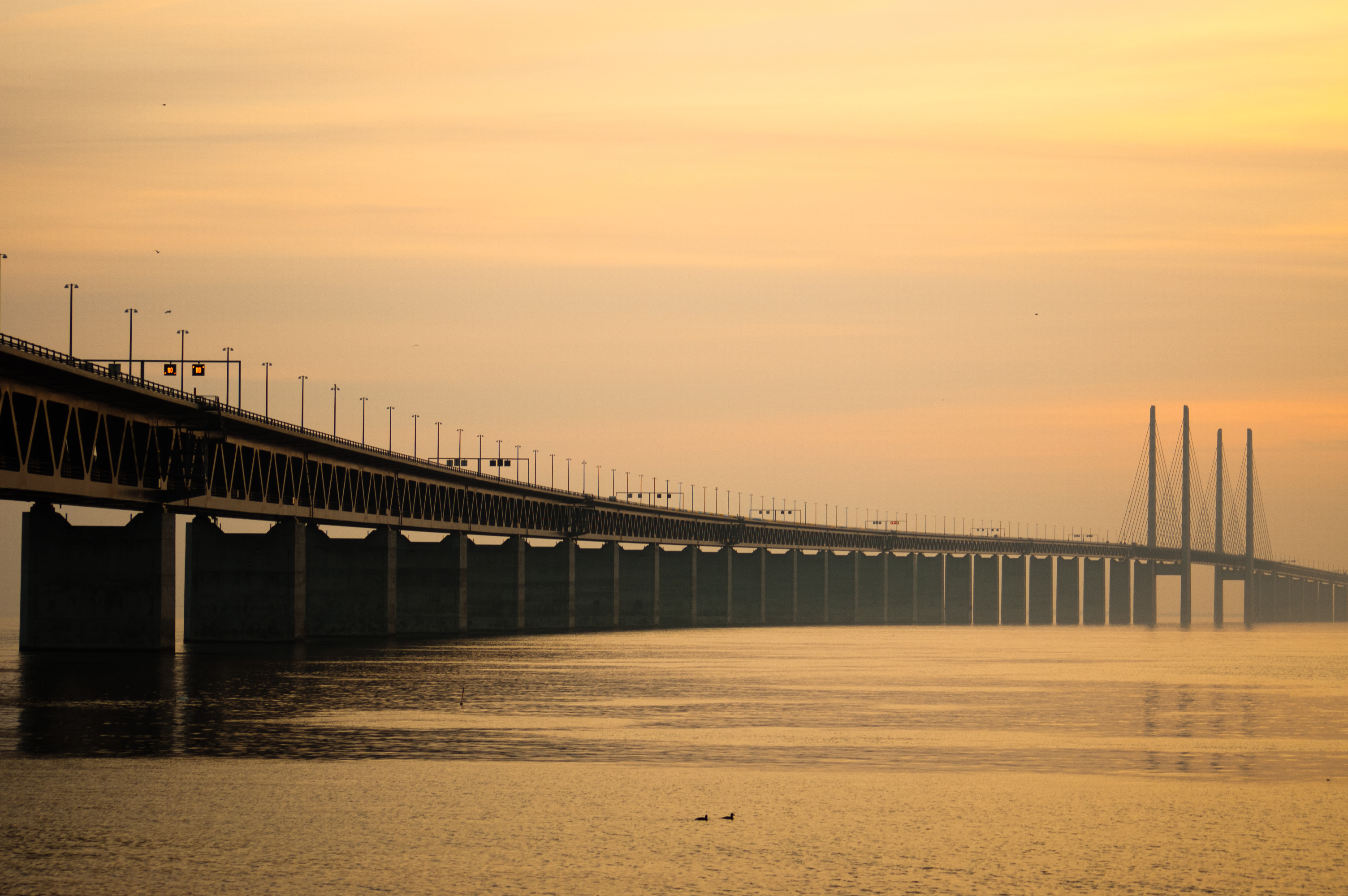
The Öresund Bridge

Malmö is served by seven railway stations, the main one being Malmö Central Station. Via the City Tunnel, Malmö Central is connected to Triangeln and Hyllie stations, where all regional and local trains also stop. From Hyllie, the line links to the Öresund line and the Öresund Bridge, connecting Malmö to Copenhagen. The remaining stations Svågertorp, Persborg, Rosengård and Östervärn are located on the city's outskirts and are exclusively served by local trains.

==== Long distance and regional trains ====
There are several regular long distance trains departing from Malmö Central Station. SJ operates X 2000 trains to Stockholm and Gothenburg and night trains to Stockholm, Hamburg and Berlin. Snälltåget runs day trains to Stockholm and night trains to Åre in northern Sweden, to Hamburg, Berlin and Dresden in Germany and to Salzburg and Innsbruck in Austria. Lastly, Vy operates trains to Oslo, Norway.

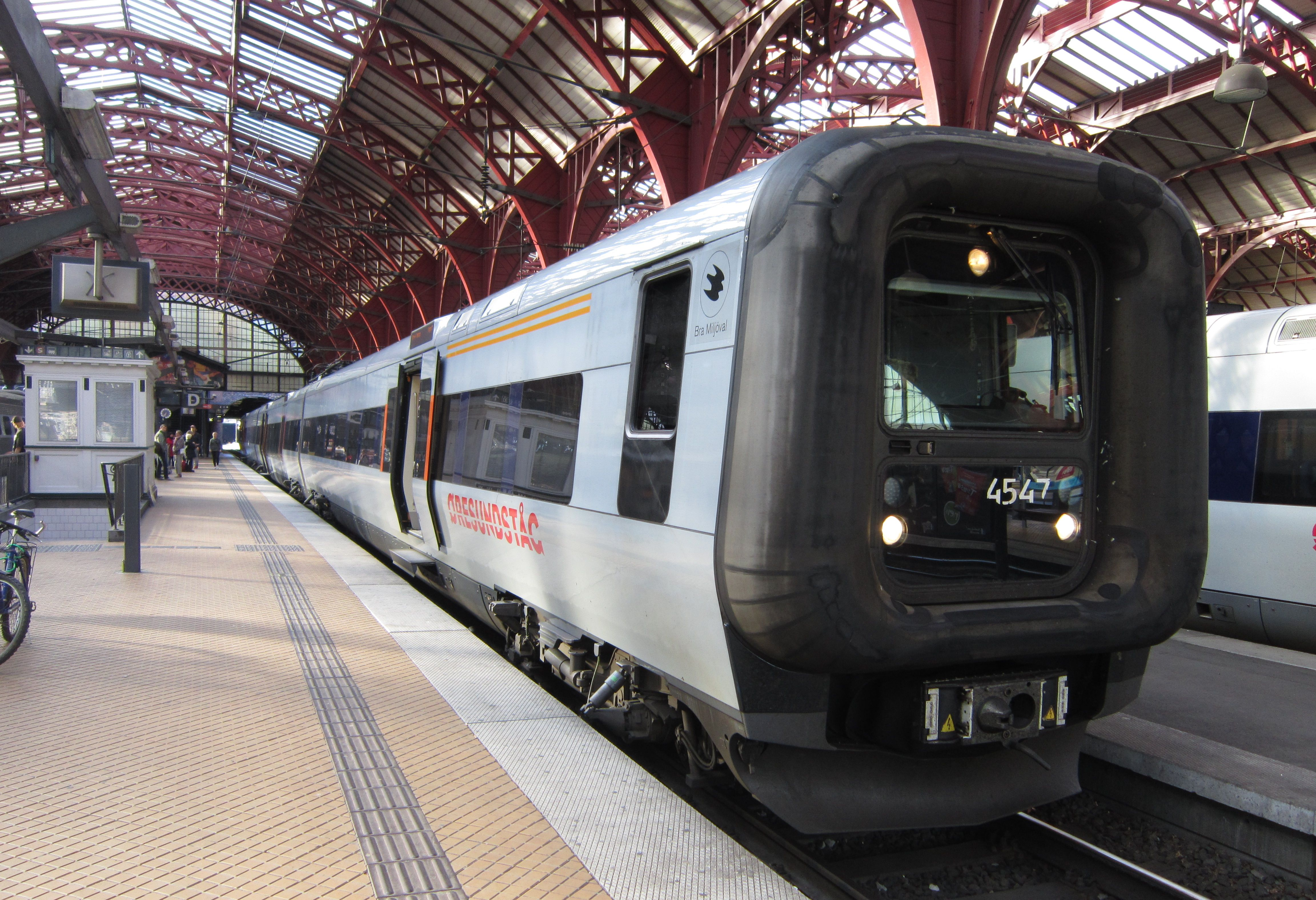
The Öresund trains (Øresundståg)

Öresund trains connect Malmö to Copenhagen, and Copenhagen Airport via the Öresund Bridge, taking approximately 40 minutes and running as frequently as every 10 minutes during rush hour or hourly at night. On the Swedish side, the trains continue northeast towards Lund, before branching towards different destinations, such as Gothenburg, Kalmar and Karlskrona.

==== Local trains ====
Interurban trains called Pågatågen connect Malmö to smaller localities in Scania, such as Ystad and Trelleborg. Within Malmö, a service known as the Malmöpendeln operates every 30 minutes on a circular route calling at all stations in Malmö, before continuing to Lomma or Kävlinge. This service started in December 2018 and carried about 600,000 passengers in 2024, a figure which was lower than originally expected.

==== Proposed metro ====
The Öresund Metro is a proposed rapid transit network linking Malmö with the existing Copenhagen Metro through a 22 kilometres (14 miles) tunnel under the Öresund. It is a project that has been proposed since 2012. A metro station can be placed in the Galeonen which is a sub-area located in the far north of Västra hamnen. The Galeon is the only larger area in Västra hamnen that is not planned yet and Malmö's general plan states that the expansion of the area is expected to take place 2032 to 2041. The connection between Malmö and Copenhagen will take approximately 20 minutes instead of 40 minutes by the Öresund Bridge. The construction cost is estimated at 4 billion euros with a construction period of 6–7 years.

=== Road network ===
The motorway system has been incorporated with the Öresund Bridge; the European route E20 goes over the bridge and then, together with the European route E6 follows the Swedish west coast from Malmö–Helsingborg to Gothenburg. E6 goes further north along the west coast and through Norway to the Norwegian town Kirkenes at Barents Sea. The European route to Jönköping–Stockholm (E4) starts at Helsingborg. Main roads in the directions of Växjö–Kalmar, Kristianstad–Karlskrona, Ystad (E65), and Trelleborg start as freeways.

Malmö has 410 kilometres (250 mi) of bike paths; approximately 40% of all commuting is done by bicycle.

=== Buses ===
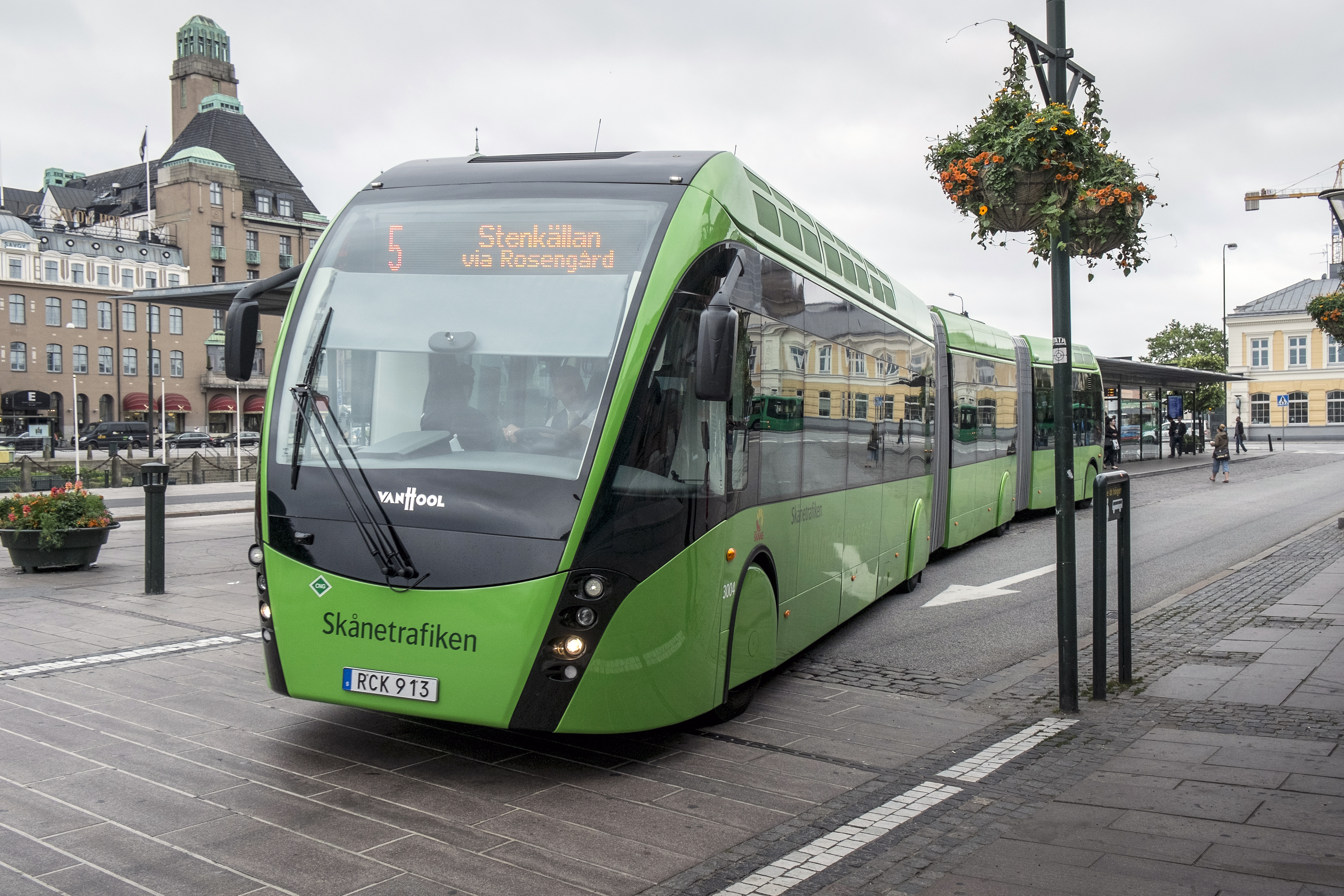
City bus at Malmö Central Station

Malmö has an extensive network of buses within the city, and is also the destination of many regional bus lines from the rest of Skåne. The bus network replaced the tram network that existed from 1887 to 1973.

=== Ports ===
The city has two industrial harbours; one is still in active use and is the largest Nordic port for car imports. It also has two marinas: the publicly owned Limhamn Marina (55°35′N 12°55′E) and the private Lagunen (55°35′N 12°56′E), both offering a limited number of guest docks.

== Municipality ==
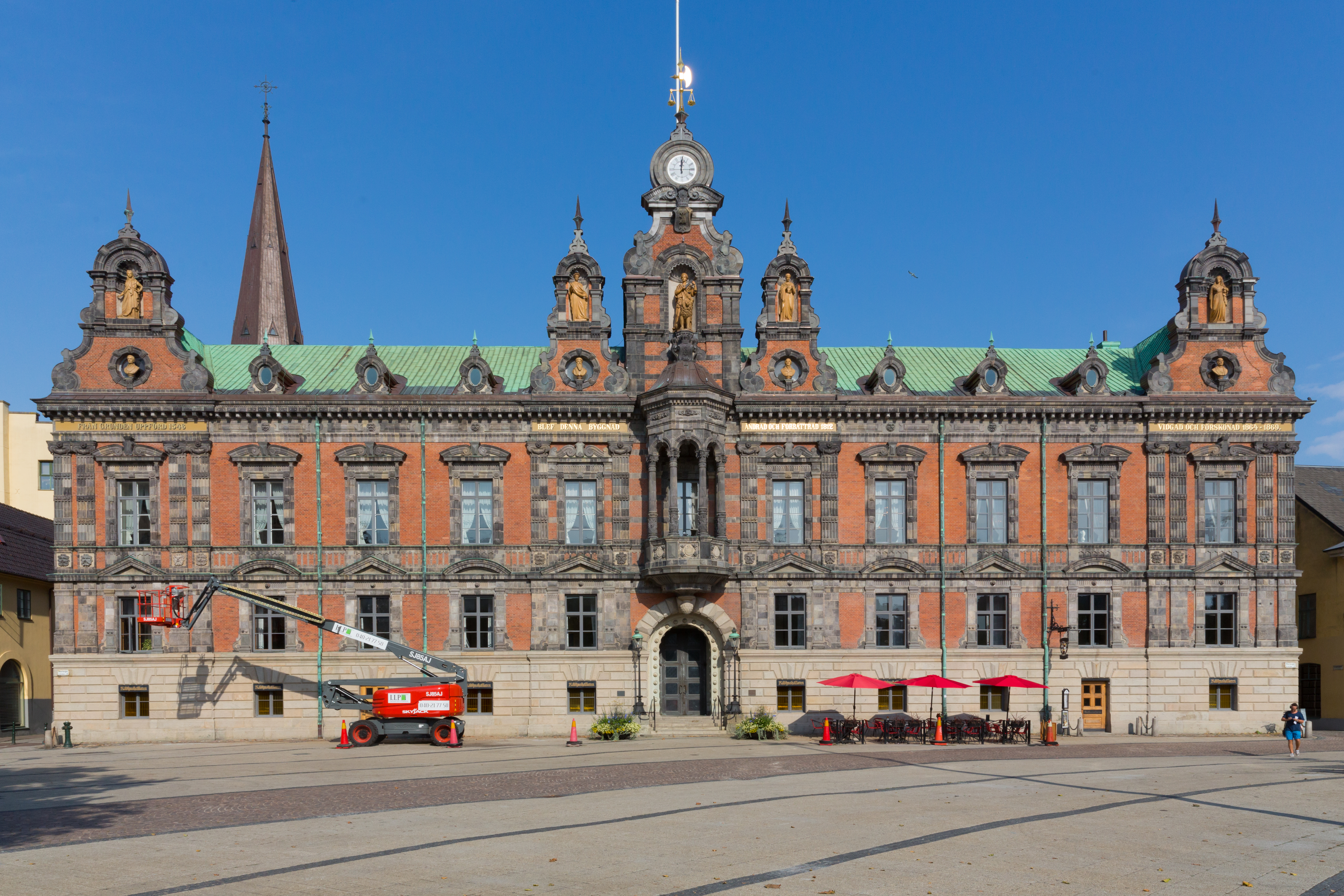
Malmö's old city hall

Malmö Municipality is an administrative unit defined by geographical borders, consisting of the City of Malmö and its immediate surroundings.

Malmö (Malmö tätort) consists of the urban part of the municipality together with the small town of Arlöv in Burlöv Municipality. Both municipalities also include smaller urban areas and rural areas, such as the suburbs of Oxie and Åkarp. Malmö tätort is to be distinguished from Malmö stad (the city of Malmö), which is a semi-official name of Malmö Municipality.

The leaders in Malmö created a commission for a socially sustainable Malmö in November 2010. The commissions were tasked with providing evidence-based strategies for reducing health inequalities and improve living conditions for all citizens of Malmö, especially for the most vulnerable and disadvantaged and issued its final report in December 2013.

== Demographics ==
Immigrant population by country of birth (2024)
Country	Population
Foreign-born	131,764 (36%)
Iraq	11,600
Syria	9,407
Denmark	7,919
Yugoslavia	6,894
Poland	6,459
Bosnia and Herzegovina	6,268
Afghanistan	5,591
Lebanon	4,638
Iran	4,467
Pakistan	3,924
Turkey	2,993
Romania	2,642
India	2,635
Somalia	2,542
Germany	2,359
North Macedonia	2,062
Vietnam	1,985
United Kingdom	1,685
Serbia	1,652
Hungary	1,509
United States	1,484
Finland	1,363
Thailand	1,352
China	1,351
Chile	1,318
Italy	1,280
Croatia	1,256
Russia	1,283
Ukraine	1,241
Kosovo	1,142
Greece	1,054
Morocco	1,016

Malmö Municipality population pyramid in 2022

Historical population
Year	Pop.	±%
1810	10,202	—
1820	12,153	+19.1%
1830	14,884	+22.5%
1840	17,370	+16.7%
1850	21,079	+21.4%
1860	27,185	+29.0%
1870	34,395	+26.5%
1880	48,206	+40.2%
1890	61,126	+26.8%
1900	81,401	+33.2%
1910	106,831	+31.2%
1920	124,304	+16.4%
1930	139,334	+12.1%
1940	162,002	+16.3%
1950	198,856	+22.7%
1960	234,453	+17.9%
1970	265,505	+13.2%
1980	233,803	−11.9%
1990	233,887	+0.0%
2000	259,579	+11.0%
2010	298,963	+15.2%
2020	347,949	+16.4%
Source: (Note: Population numbers are for current borders, including the now-annexed settlements of Bunkeflo, Fosie, Glostorp, Husie, Limhamn, Lockarp, Oxie, Södra Sallerup, Tygelsjö, Västra Klagstorp and Västra Skrävlinge.)

Malmö has a young population by Swedish standards, with almost half of the population under the age of 35 (48.2%).

After 1971, Malmö had 265,000 inhabitants, but the population then dropped to 229,000 by 1985. It then began to rise again, and had passed the previous record by the 1 January 2003 census, when it had 265,481 inhabitants. The total population of the urban area was 280,415 in December 2010. On 27 April 2011, the population of Malmö reached the 300,000 mark. In 2017 the total population of the city was 316,588 inhabitants out of a municipal total of 338,230. In 2016 Malmö served as a primary entry point for the majority of migrants heading to Sweden.

Malmö is a diverse city with inhabitants from 179 different nationalities. In 2019, approximately 55.5%, up from 17% in 1986, of the population of Malmö municipality (190,849 residents) had at least one parent born abroad. The statistics from 2020 show that 120,517 are foreign born, 43,740 are born in Sweden and have two foreign parents, 30,878 are born in Sweden with one Swedish parent and one foreign parent and 152,813 are born with two Swedish parents. The Middle East, Horn of Africa, former Yugoslavia and Denmark are the main sources of immigration.

Greater Malmö is one of Sweden's three officially recognized metropolitan areas (storstadsområden) and since 2005 is defined as the municipality of Malmö and 11 other municipalities in the southwestern corner of Skåne County. As of 2024, its population was recorded as 780,035. The region covers an area of 2,522 square kilometres (974 sq mi). The municipalities included, apart from Malmö, are Burlöv, Eslöv, Höör, Kävlinge, Lomma, Lund, Skurup, Staffanstorp, Svedala, Trelleborg and Vellinge. Together with Lund, Malmö is the region's economic and education hub.

=== Religion ===
In Malmö, as in the rest of Sweden, there are no official statistics on religious beliefs, however some institutions share figures on their membership.

The largest religion in Malmö is Christianity and the Church of Sweden has the largest membership base, with a total of 125,697 in 2019, corresponding to 36% of its population. There are several Catholic communities in Malmö, one being the Church of Our Saviour with 7,500 members.

Islam is the second-largest religion, as approximately 50,000 or 14% of the city's inhabitants have a Muslim background, according to Malmö's Islamic Center. Furthermore, school absenteeism during Eid al-Fitr has ranged from one third of pupils in 2024 to one quarter in 2025, compared to 8% during the average school day. Malmö Mosque was opened in 1984 and is managed by the Islamic Center. Mahmood Mosque opened in 2016, and serves the Ahmadiyya community.

Malmö has one synagogue, Malmö Synagogue, and two congregations: one orthodox and one egalitarian. The Jewish community has a membership of 500.

== Economy ==
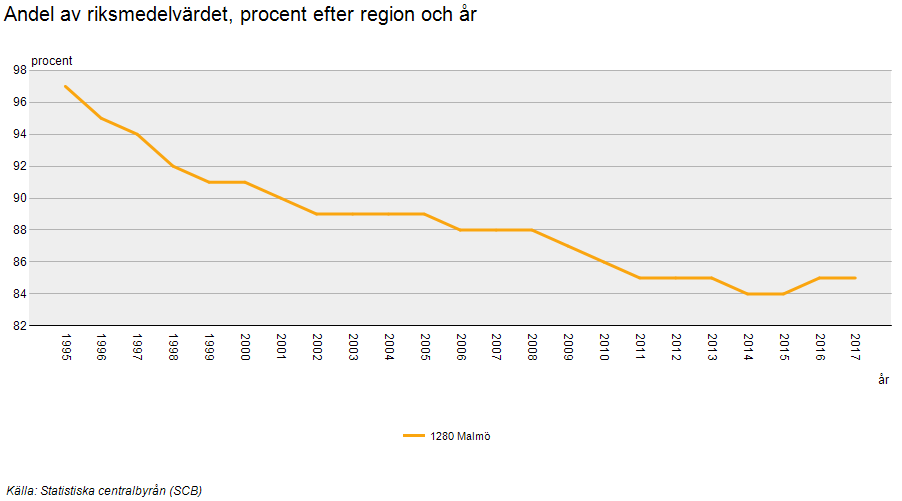
SCB Malmo taxable income per citizen as percentage of national average 1995 2016

In 2022, Malmö’s gross regional product (GRP) amounted to 240.2 billion Swedish krona (SEK). This represents a 54.7% increase in real terms since 2016, well above the growth rates for both Scania (36.2%) and Sweden (33.2%). GRP per capita was 671,991 SEK, higher than the regional and national averages. As of 2023, the city's largest employment sectors are business services (35,710 employees) healthcare and social services (28,956) and motor vehicle services (26,029). Other large sectors include education, information and communications, and public administration.

Largest private employers in Malmö in 2023
Company	Employees
Trygg-Hansa Försäkring	1,275
Pågen	1,175
Ingka Services	925
Nobina Sverige	925
Ubisoft	875
Språkservice	825
Skanska	775
Transdev	775
IKEA IT	675
VR Sverige	675
Source: Svenskt Näringsliv, Region Skåne

The economy of Malmö was traditionally based on shipbuilding and manufacturing, with the Kockums shipyard as its largest employer. A recession between 1973 and 1975 brought prolonged stagnation, leading to high unemployment and population decline, while Kockums shipyard's closure in 1986 further deepened the crisis. During the Swedish financial crisis in the early 1990s, conditions worsened further, leading to a loss of 27,000 jobs. From the mid-1990s, Malmö began recovering as it shifted towards education, services, and urban redevelopment. Notably, the Öresund Bridge, built between 1995 and 2000, allowed for deeper economic integration with Denmark.

Employment in Malmö has grown steadily since the mid-1990s, supported by population growth and redevelopment and as of 2022, 209,678 people had their workplace in the city. Malmö functions as a regional employment hub, with 82,248 people commuting in for work, compared to 47,760 commuting out. Nonetheless, unemployment has remained high since the 2010s, amid fast population growth, and as of July 2025 it stood at 12.3%, the second highest rate in Sweden.

Entrepreneurship in Malmö is relatively high compared with the national average. In 2024, the city saw 12.6 new companies per 1,000 inhabitants aged 16–64, compared with 11.1 in Scania and 10.9 in Sweden.

Since the early 2000s, Malmö has attracted a growing number of companies opening offices or relocating operations to the city. Over 70 large and medium-sized firms have established headquarters or regional offices, often moving from smaller towns in southern Sweden. Key factors include proximity to Copenhagen Airport, access to a larger pool of skilled workers and availability of modern office space in districts such as Hyllie and Västra hamnen. Among the largest relocations are three companies founded by Ingvar Kamprad: Inter IKEA, Ingka and Ikano Bank, which collectively employ over 4,200 people in Malmö.

== Education ==
Malmö has the country's ninth-largest school of higher education, Malmö University, established in 1998. It has 1,600 employees and 24,000 students (2014).

In addition nearby Lund University (established in 1666) has some educational facilities located in Malmö:

- Malmö Art Academy (Konsthögskolan i Malmö)
- Malmö Academy of Music (Musikhögskolan i Malmö)
- Malmö Theatre Academy (Teaterhögskolan i Malmö)
- The Faculty of Medicine, which is located in both Malmö and Lund.

The United Nations World Maritime University is also located in Malmö. The World Maritime University (WMU) operates under the auspices of the International Maritime Organization (IMO), a specialized agency of the United Nations. WMU thus enjoys the status, privileges and immunities of a UN institution in Sweden.

== Culture ==
=== Film and television ===
A striking depiction of Malmö (in the 1930s) was made by Bo Widerberg in his debut film Kvarteret Korpen (transl. 'Raven's End') (1963), largely shot in the shabby Korpen working-class district in Malmö. With humour and tenderness, it depicts the tensions between classes and generations. The movie was nominated for an Academy Award for Best Foreign Language Film in 1965. In 2017, the film Medan Vi Lever (transl. 'While We Live') was awarded the prize for best film by an African living abroad at the Africa Movie Academy Awards. It was filmed in Malmö and Gambia, and deals with identity, integration and everyday racism.

The cities of Malmö and Copenhagen are, with the Öresund Bridge, the main locations in the television series The Bridge (Bron, Danish: Broen).

=== Theatre ===
In 1944, Malmö Stadsteater (Malmö Municipal Theatre) was established with a repertoire comprising stage theatre, opera, musical, ballet, musical recitals and experimental theatre. In 1993 it was split into three units, Dramatiska Teater (Dramatical Theatre), Malmö Musikteater (Music Theatre) and Skånes Dansteater (Skåne Dance Theatre) and the name was abandoned. The ownership of the last two were transferred to Region Skåne in 2006 Dramatiska Teatern regained its old name. In the 1950s Ingmar Bergman was the Director and Chief Stage Director of Malmö Stadsteater and many of his actors, like Max von Sydow and Ingrid Thulin became known through his films. Later stage directors include Staffan Valdemar Holm and Göran Stangertz. Malmö Musikteater were renamed Malmö Operan and plays operas and musicals, classics as newly composed, on one of Scandinavia's large opera scenes with 1,511 seats. Skånes dansteater is active and plays contemporary dance repertory and present works by Swedish and international choreographers in their house in Malmö harbor.

Since the 1970s the city has also been home to independent theatre groups and show or musical companies. It also hosts a rock–dance–dub culture; in the 1960s The Rolling Stones played the Klubb Bongo, and in recent years stars like Morrissey, Nick Cave, B.B. King and Pat Metheny have made repeated visits.

The Cardigans debuted in Malmö and recorded their albums there. On 7 January 2009 CNN Travel broadcast a segment called "MyCity_MyLife" featuring Nina Persson taking the camera to some of the sites in Malmö that she enjoys.

The Rooseum Centre for Contemporary Art, founded in 1988 by the Swedish art collector and financier Fredrik Roos and housed in a former power station which had been built in 1900, was one of the foremost centres for contemporary art in Europe during the 1980s and 1990s. By 2006, most of the collection had been sold off and the museum was on a time-out; by 2010 Rooseum had been dismantled and a subsidiary of the National Museum of Modern Art inaugurated in its place.

=== Music ===
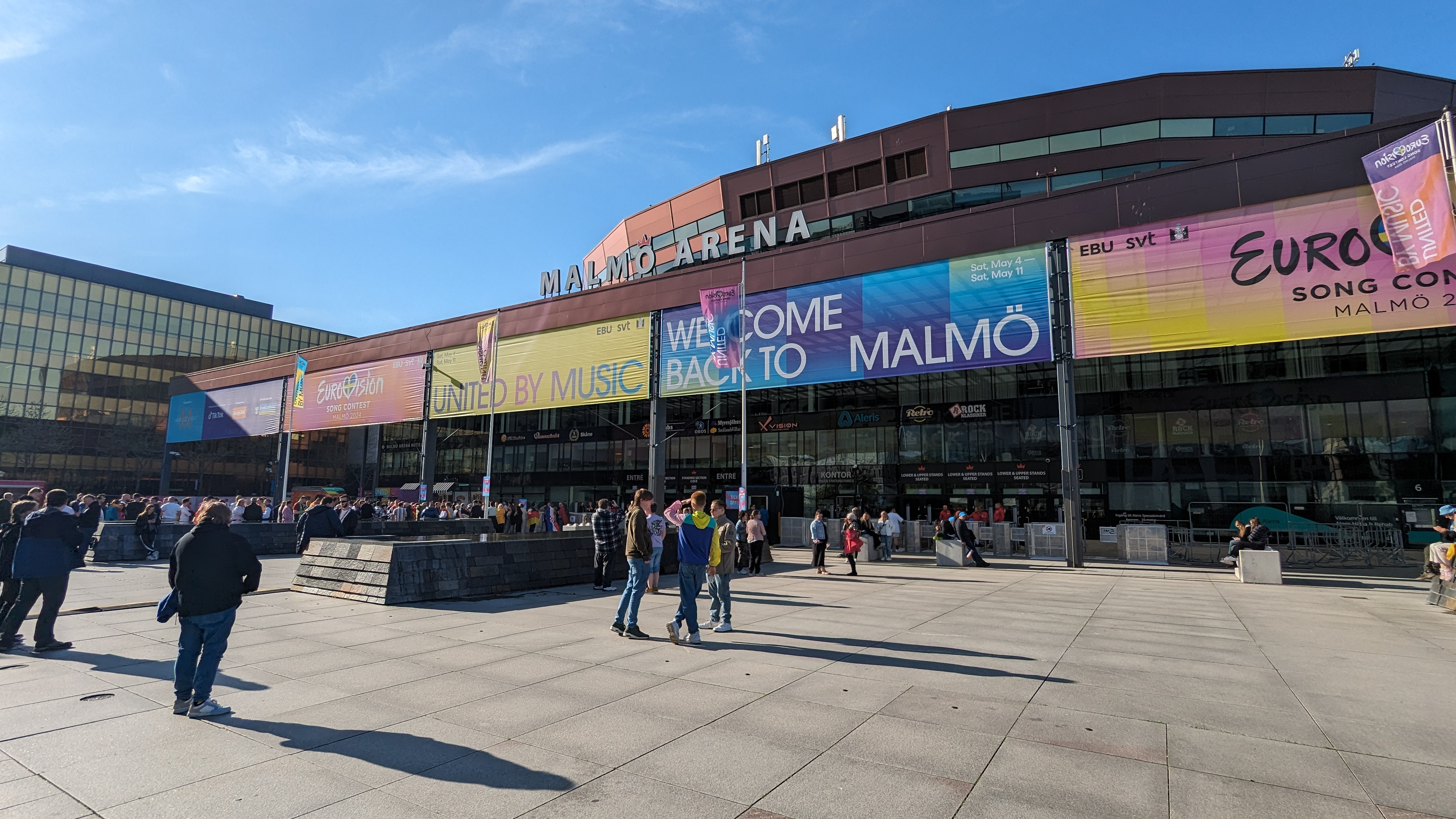
Malmö Arena during the Eurovision Song Contest 2024

Malmö has hosted the Eurovision Song Contest three times, in 1992, 2013 and 2024. It is the only non-capital city to do so.

Big Slap is a music festival, held annually since 2013 at Pildammsparken. The 2022 edition of Big Slap featured Justin Bieber, the biggest concert in Malmö's history.

Malmö is the home of several bands, including CC & Lee, Fews, LeGrand, Nasty Idols, Royal Republic, Spunsugar and Timeless Miracle.

=== Museums ===
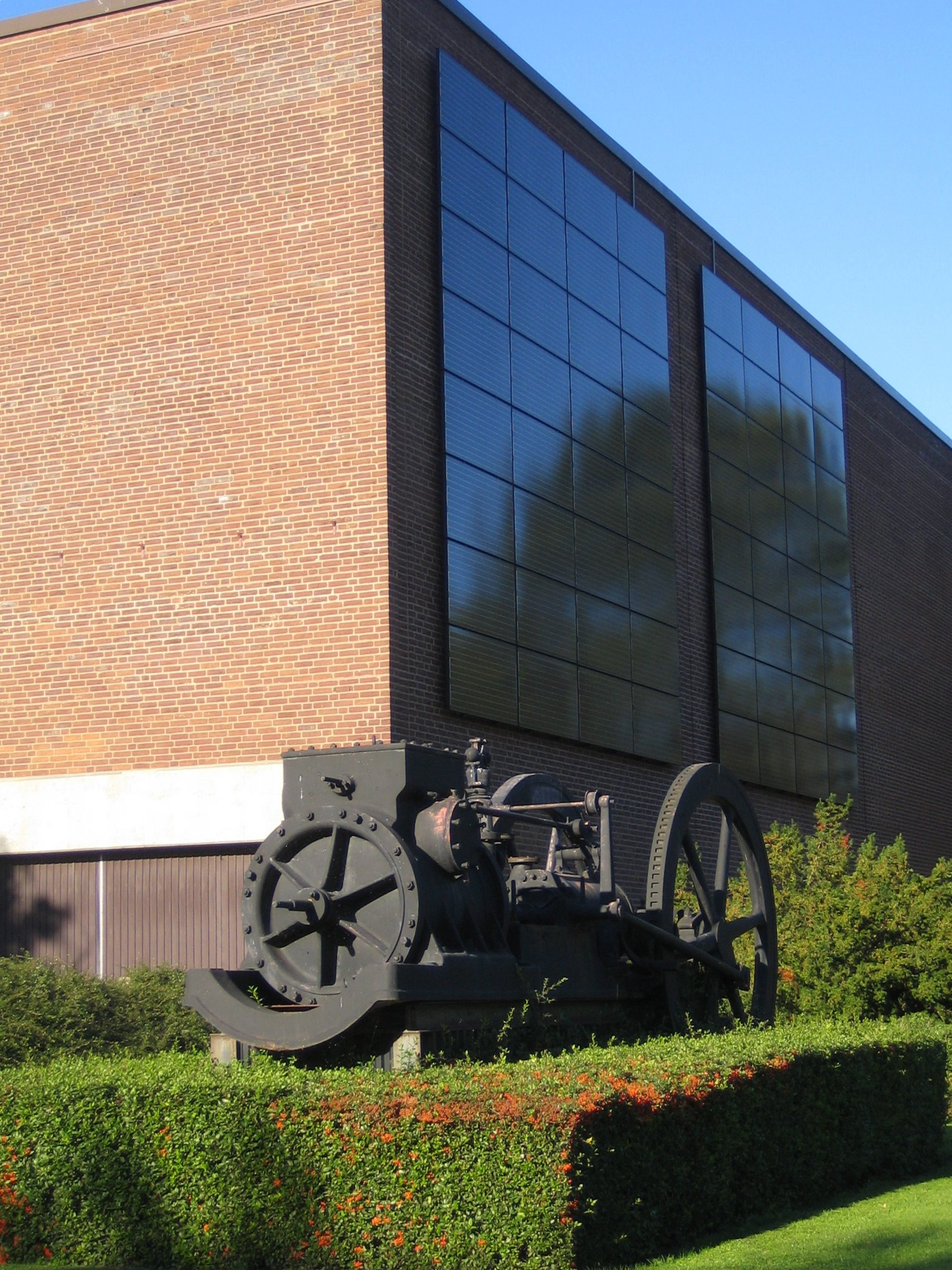
Technology and Maritime Museum

Malmö Art Museum (Malmö Museer) is a municipal and regional museum that primarily consists of the city's art collection. The museum also features exhibitions on natural history. Malmö Museum also has an aquarium. Malmöhus Castle is also operated as a part of the museum.

The Malmo Technology and Maritime Museum (Teknikens och sjöfartens hus) houses various industrial exhibits, as well as aircraft, boats and a submarine. Temporary exhibitions are primarily shown at Slottsholmen and at the Technology and Maritime Museum (Teknikens och sjöfartens hus).

Moderna Museet Malmö was opened in December 2009 in the old Rooseum building. It is a part of the Moderna Museet, with independent exhibitions of modern and contemporary art. The collection of Moderna Museet holds key pieces of, among others, Marcel Duchamp, Louise Bourgeois, Pablo Picasso, Niki de Saint Phalle, Salvador Dalí, Carolee Schneemann, Henri Matisse and Robert Rauschenberg

Malmö Konsthall is one of the largest exhibition halls in Europe for contemporary art, opened in 1975.

=== Architecture ===
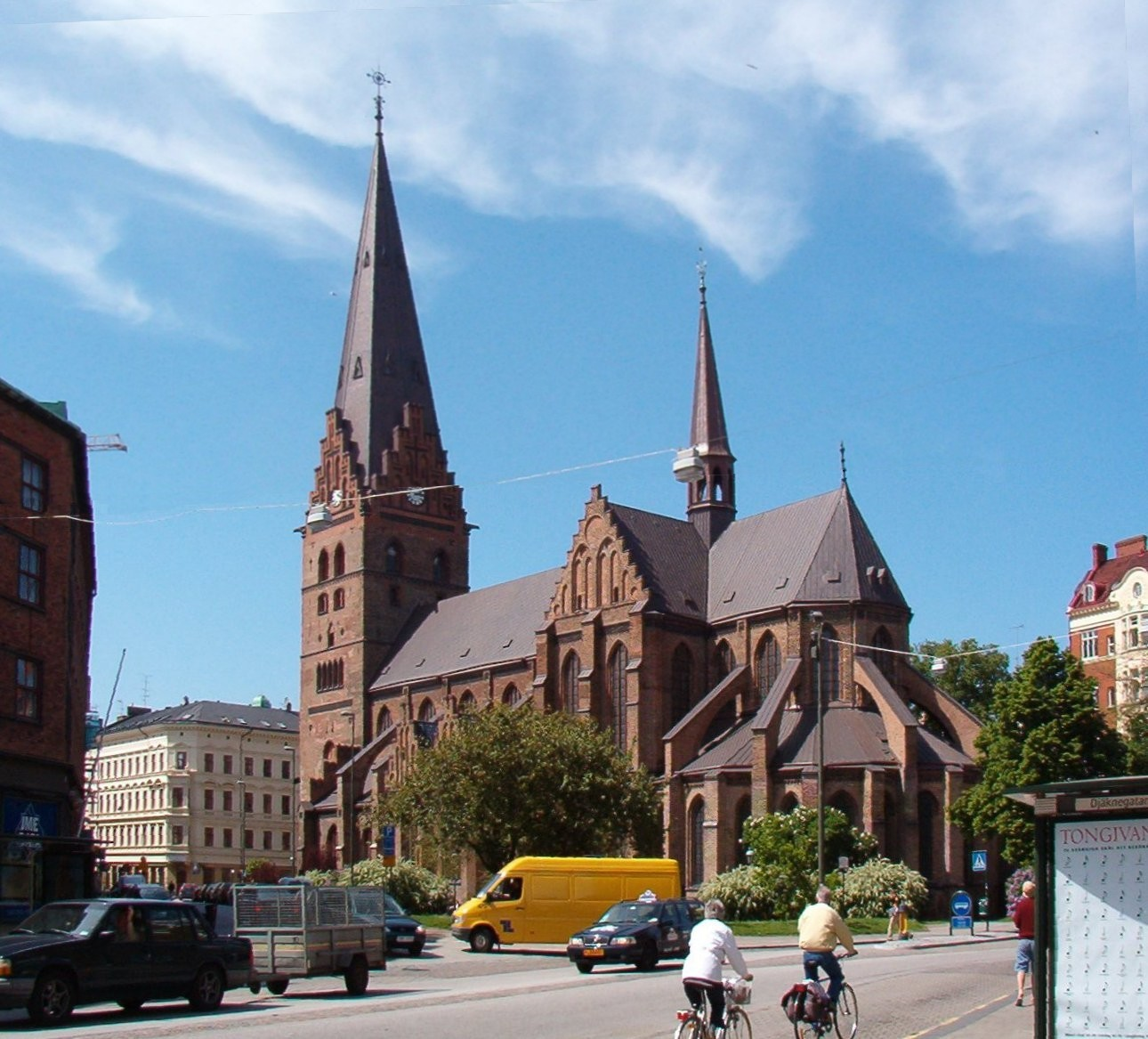
St. Peter's Church in Malmö

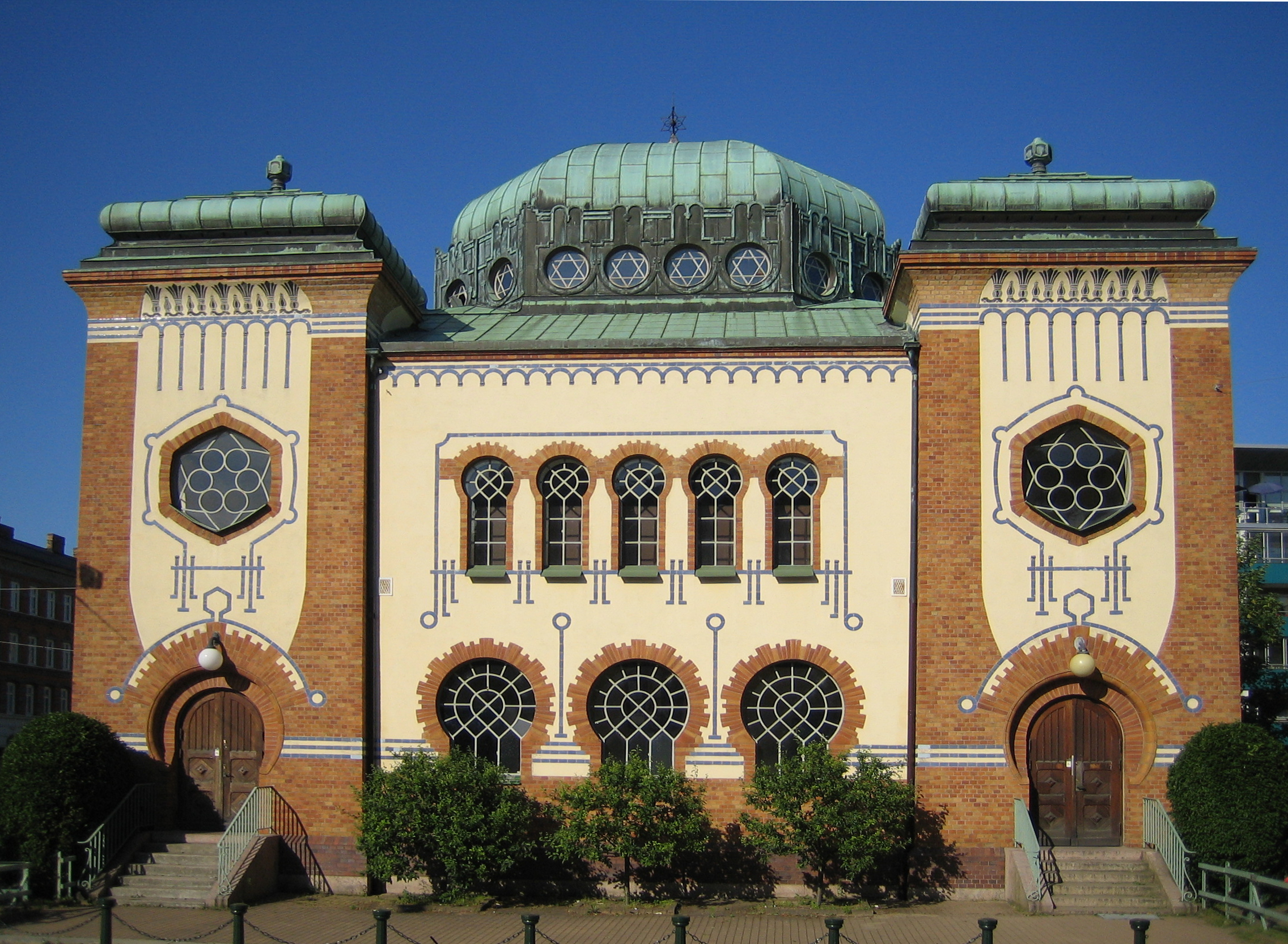
Art Nouveau Malmö synagogue

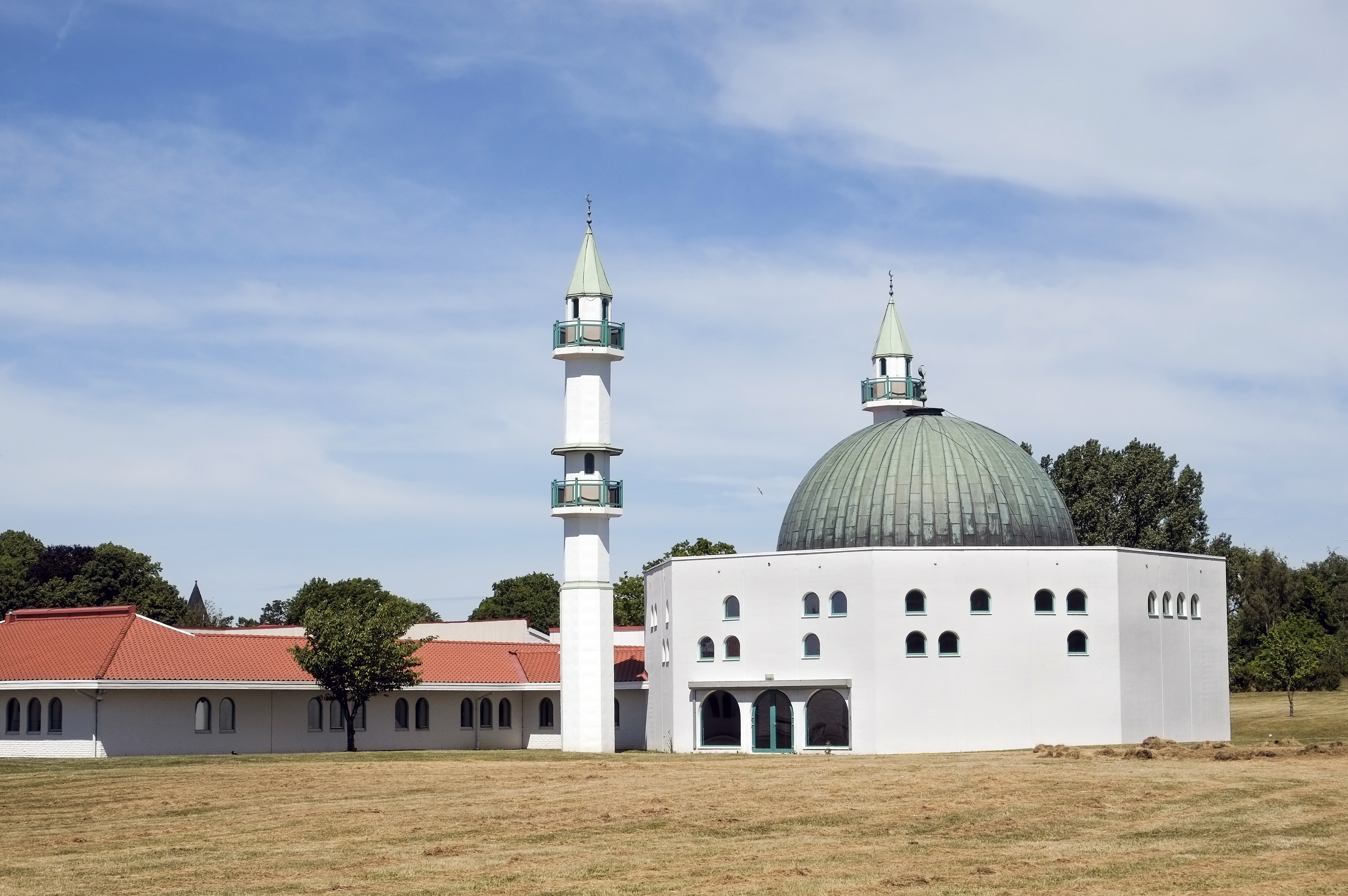
Mosque in Malmö

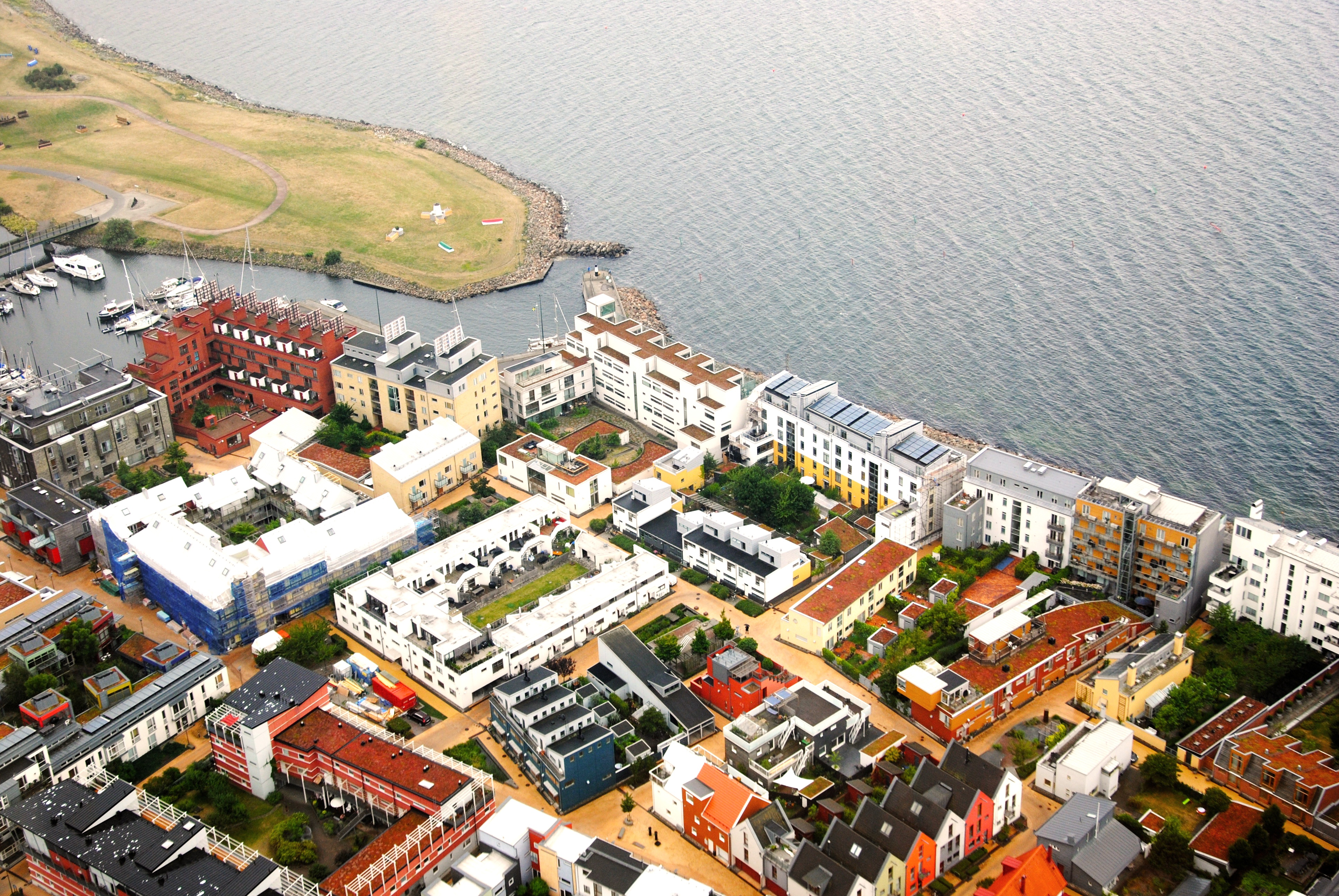
Västra hamnen skyview, Malmö

Malmö's oldest building is St. Peter's Church (Swedish: Sankt Petri). It was built in the early 14th century in Baltic Brick Gothic probably after St Mary's Church in Lübeck. The church is built with a nave, two aisles, a transept and a tower. Its exterior is characterized above all by the flying buttresses spanning its airy arches over the aisles and ambulatory. The tower, which fell down twice during the 15th century, got its current look in 1890. Another major church of significance is the Church of Our Saviour, Malmö, which was founded in 1870.

Another old building is Tunneln, 300 metres (1,000 ft) to the west of Sankt Petri Church, which also dates back to around 1300.

The oldest parts of Malmö were built between 1300 and 1600 during its first major period of expansion. The central city's layout, as well as some of its oldest buildings, are from this time. Many of the smaller buildings from this time are typical Scanian: two-story urban houses that show a strong Danish influence.

Recession followed in the ensuing centuries. The next expansion period was in the mid 19th century and led to the modern stone and brick city. This expansion lasted into the 20th century and can be seen by a number of Art Nouveau buildings, among those in the Malmö synagogue. Malmö was relatively late to be influenced by modern ideas of functionalist tenement architecture in the 1930s.

Around 1965, the government initiated the so-called Million Programme, intending to offer affordable apartments in the outskirts of major Swedish cities. But this period also saw the reconstruction (and razing) of much of the historical city centre.

Since the late 1990s, Malmö has seen a more cosmopolitan architecture. Västra hamnen (the Western Harbor), like most of the harbors to the north of the city centre, was industrial. In 2001 its reconstruction began as an urban residential neighbourhood, with 500 residential units, most were part of the exhibition Bo01. The exhibition had two main objectives: develop self-sufficient housing units in terms of energy and greatly diminish phosphorus emissions. Among the new building's towers were the Turning Torso, a skyscraper with a twisting design, 190 metres (620 ft) tall, the majority of which is residential. It became Malmö's new landmark. The most recent addition (2015) is the new development of Malmö Live. This new building features a hotel, a concert hall, congress hall and a sky bar in the centre of Malmö. Point Hyllie is a new 110 m (360 ft) commercial tower that began construction in 2018.

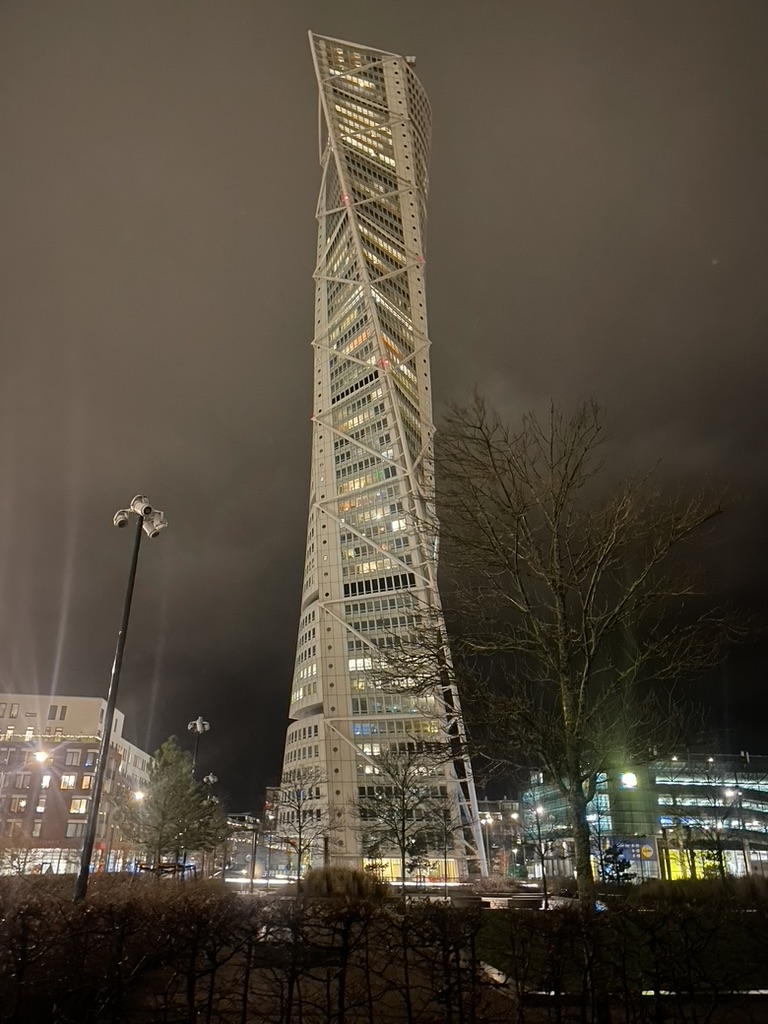
The Turning Torso in winter skylight, January 2024

=== Other sights ===
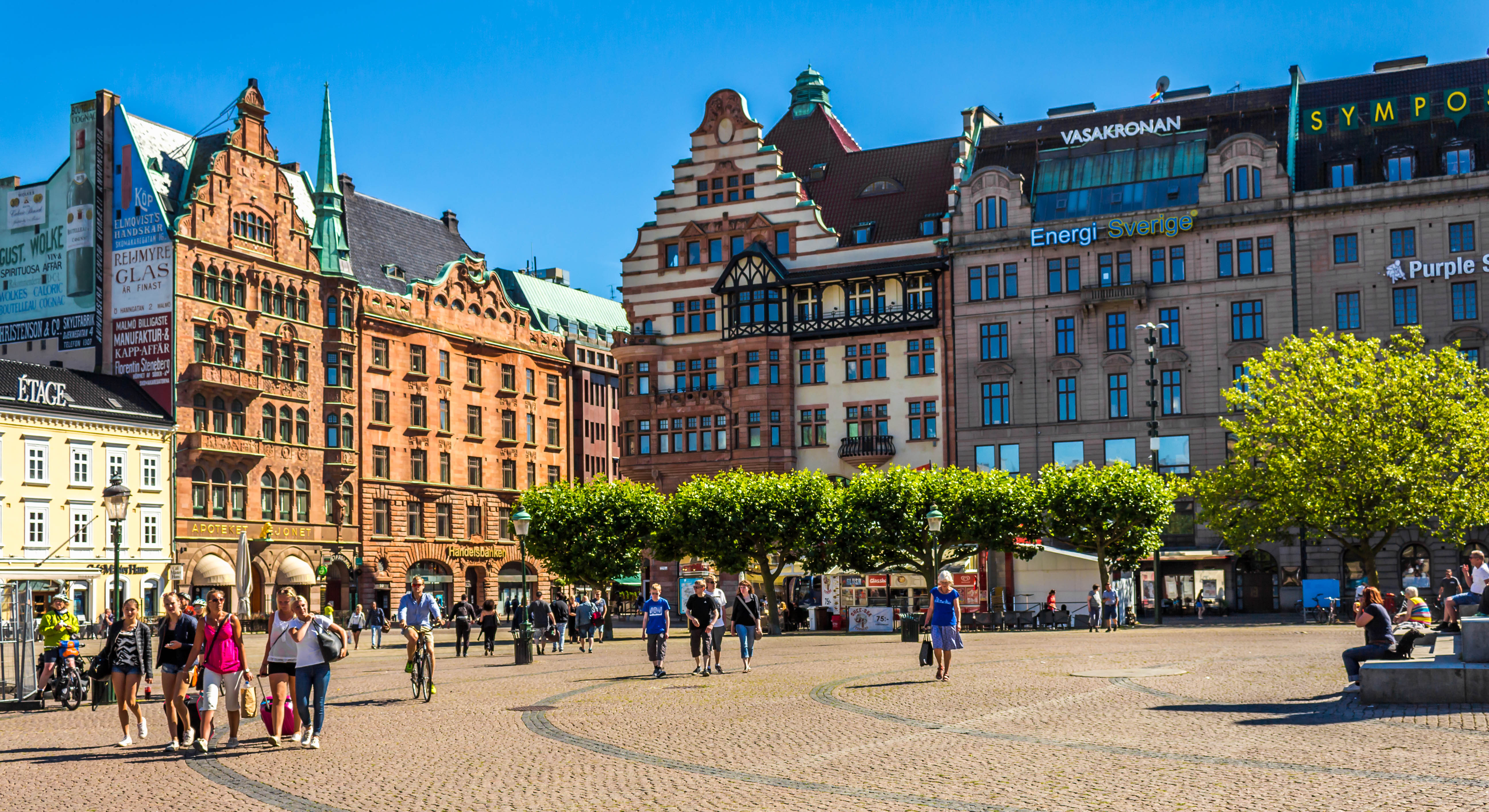
Stortorget, a large plaza in the centre of Malmö

The beach Ribersborg, by locals usually called Ribban, south-west of the harbor area, is a man-made shallow beach, stretching along Malmö's coastline. Despite Malmö's chilly climate, it is sometimes referred to as the "Copacabana of Malmö". It is the site of Ribersborgs open-air bath, opened in the 1890s.

The long boardwalk at the Western Harbor, Scaniaparken and Daniaparken, has become a favourite summer hang-out for the people of Malmö and is a popular place for bathing. The harbor is particularly popular with Malmö's student community and has been the scene of several impromptu outdoor parties and gatherings.

=== Annual events ===
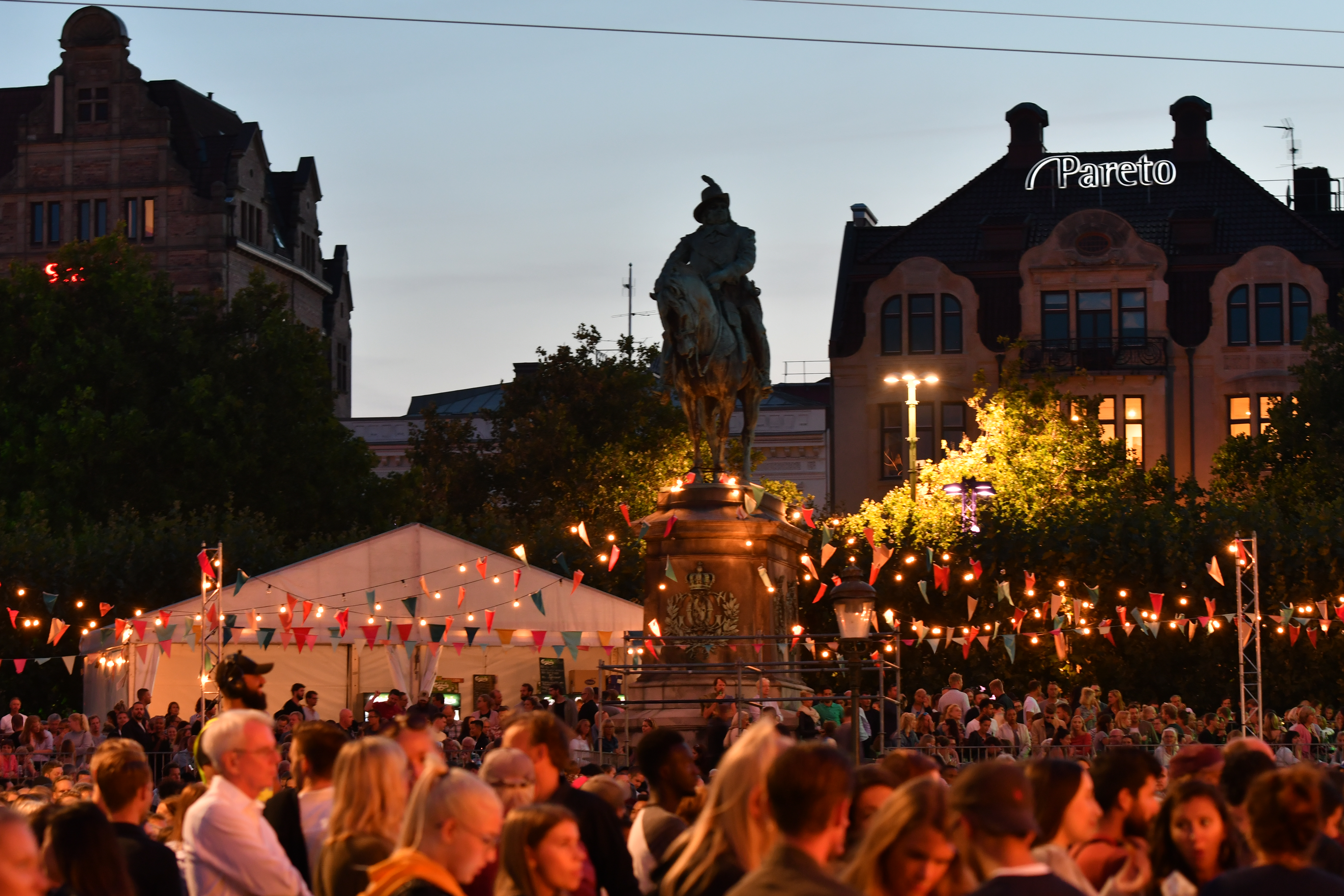
Stortorget during Malmöfestivalen 2018

In the third week of August each year a festival, Malmöfestivalen, fills the streets of Malmö with different kinds of cuisines and events.

BUFF International Film Festival, an international children and young people's film festival, is held in Malmö every March.

Nordisk Panorama Film Festival, a film festival for short and documentary films by filmmakers from the Nordic countries, is held every September.

Malmö Arab Film Festival (MAFF), the largest Arabic film festival in Europe, is held in Malmö.

The Conference is an international two-day gathering in Malmö with 1000 participants. Speakers from all over the world, representing a wide range of disciplines are invited. The first edition of The Conference was in 2011 and before that it was called Moving Images (started 2005). The last event was held in 2024, with the organizers placing it on 'pause' to rework the event.

The Nordic Game conference takes place in Malmö every April/May. The event consists of conference itself, recruitment expo and game expo and attracts hundreds of "gamedev" (game development) professionals every year.

Malmö also hosts other 3rd party events that cater to all communities that reside in Malmö, including religious and political celebrations.

=== Media ===
Sydsvenskan, founded in 1870, is Malmö's largest daily newspaper. It has an average circulation of 130,000. Its main competitor is the regional daily Skånska Dagbladet, which has a circulation of 34,000. The tabloid Kvällsposten still has a minimal editorial staff but is today just a version of a Stockholm tabloid. The Social Democratic Arbetet was edited and printed at Malmö between 1887 and 2000.

In addition to these, a number of free-of-charge papers, generally dealing with entertainment, music and fashion have local editions (for instance City, Rodeo, Metro and Nöjesguiden). Malmö is also home to the Egmont Group's Swedish magazine operations.

Sweden's national public television broadcaster, SVT, has a studio in the city which broadcast regional programming to Malmö and across the Skåne region. Malmö mediakanal, is a non-profit local television channel that broadcasts both analog and digital content across Malmö.

Sveriges Radio, Sweden's national publicly funded radio broadcaster, also has a radio station in Malmö that broadcast local radio to the city and the Skåne region on Sveriges Radio P4. Other local radio stations are Malmökanalen, Radio Yalla, and Retreat Radio.

=== Sports ===
==== Football ====
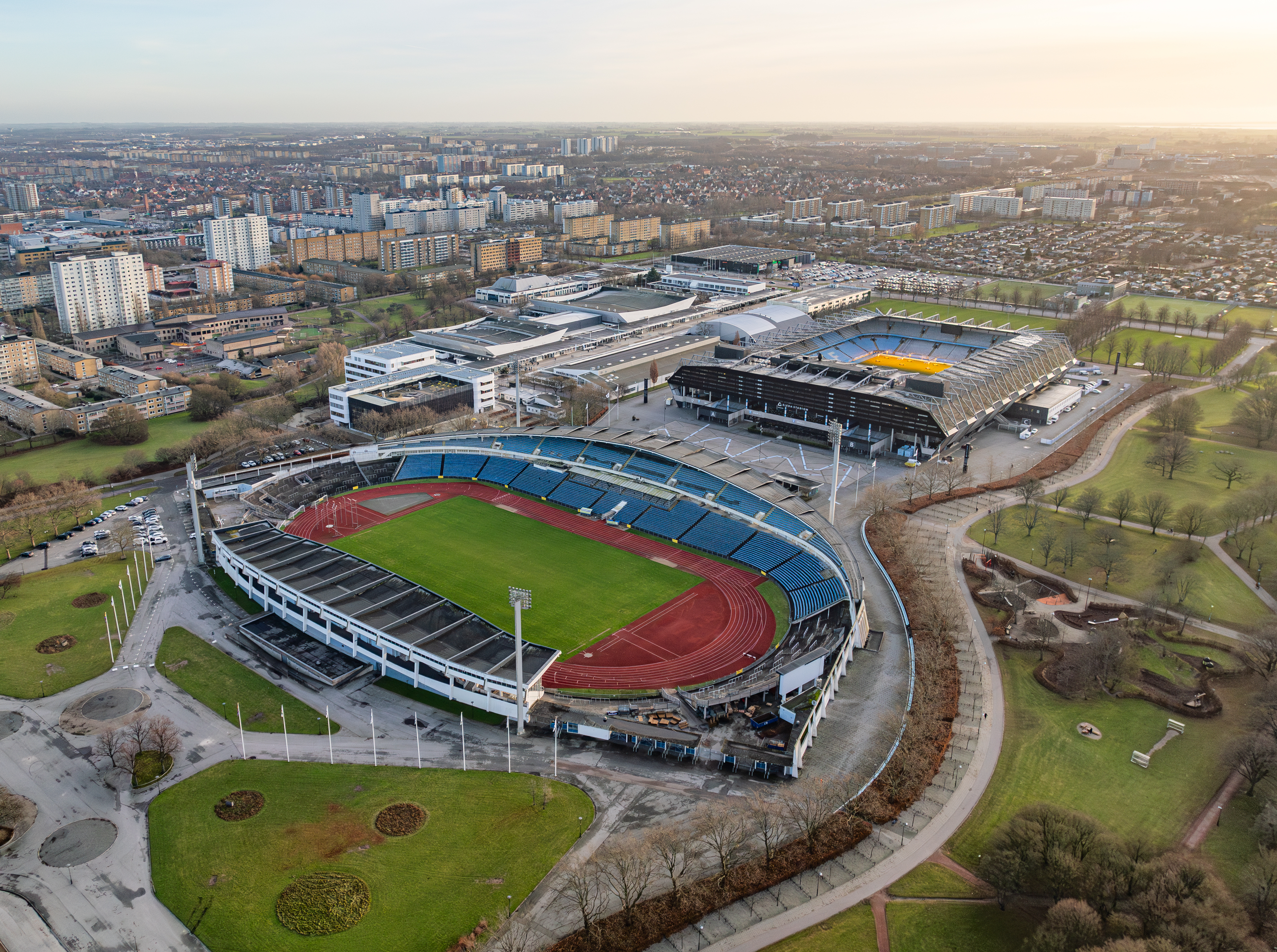
Malmö Stadion and Eleda Stadion (background), the homes of Malmö FF

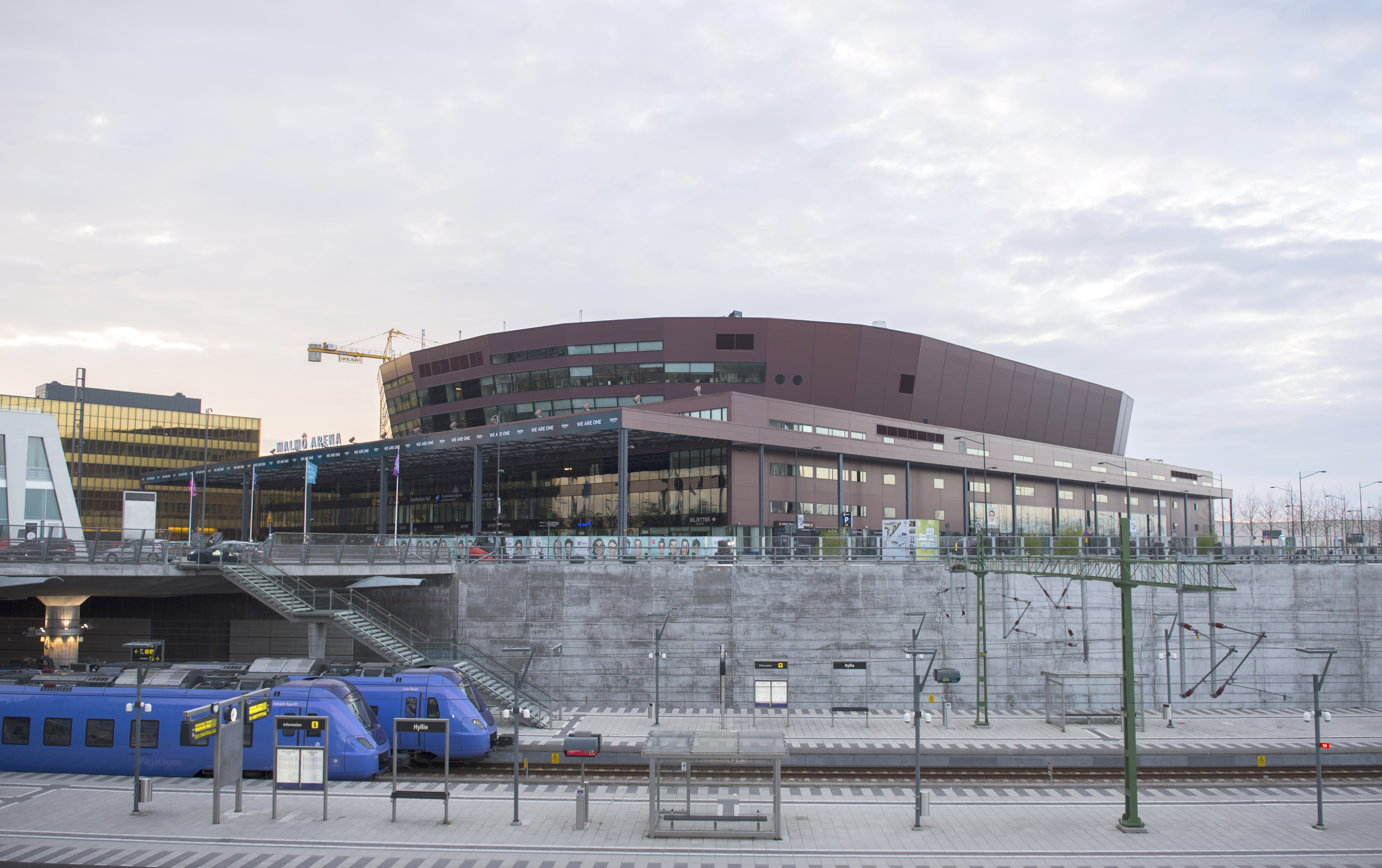
Malmö Arena, the home of Malmö Redhawks

Malmö is home to several football teams. Malmö FF, who play in the top-level Allsvenskan league, had their most successful periods in the 1970s and 1980s, when they won the league several times. In 1979, they advanced to the final of the European Cup, defeating AS Monaco, Dynamo Kiev, Wisła Kraków and Austria Wien. In the final, played at the Munich Olympic Stadium against Nottingham Forest, they lost by a single goal scored by Trevor Francis just before half time. As of 2026, they are the only Swedish football club to have reached the final of the competition. Bosse Larsson and Zlatan Ibrahimović began their football careers at Malmö FF. A second football team, IFK Malmö, played in Sweden's top flight for about 20 years. The club's greatest achievement was reaching the quarterfinal in the European Cup. In the 2023 Regular Season, IFK Malmö ranked last in the Södra Götaland section of the fourth tier of the Swedish football league system, Division 2.

FC Rosengård (former LdB Malmö) and Malmö FF (women) are playing in the top level in Damallsvenskan, women's football league. FC Rosengård girls have won the league 10 times and the national cup title 5 times. In 2014, they reached the semi-final in Champions League, which they ultimately went on to lose to the German side 1. FFC Frankfurt. Brazilian football player Marta, widely regarded the best female football player of all time, played in FC Rosengård between 2014 and 2017.

Malmö Stadion was inaugurated for the opening match of the 1958 FIFA World Cup. The then world champions, West Germany, defeated Argentina 3–1 in front of a crowd of 31,156. A further two games in the cup were decided at the stadium.

==== Other sports ====
Malmö has athletes competing in a variety of sport.

===== Ice hockey =====
The most notable other sports team is the ice hockey team Malmö Redhawks. They were the creation of millionaire Percy Nilsson and quickly rose to the highest rank in the early to mid-1990s and won two Swedish championships, but for a number of years found themselves residing outside of the top flight. As of the 2015/2016 season they are once again competing in the top flight SHL league.

===== Handball =====
A first division handball team, HK Malmö, attracts a fair amount of attendance.

===== Rugby =====
Rugby union team, Malmö RC, founded in 1954, have won 6 national championships. The club has teams for men, women and juniors.

===== Gaelic football =====
Gaelic football has also been introduced to Malmö. The men of Malmö G.A.A. have won the Scandinavian Championships twice and the women once.

===== Roller derby =====
Malmö Roller Derby - Crime City Rollers has won the Roller Derby Swedish Championships (SM) nine times in a row (last time in 2026). The A-team is currently ranked number 4 in Europe. The 2026 global WFTDA roller derby championships will also be held in Malmö from 15-18 October 2026, with Crime City Rollers hosting and competing.

===== Other team and individual sports =====
Other notable team sports are baseball, American football and Australian football. Among non-team sports, badminton and athletics are the most popular, together with East Asian martial arts and boxing. Basketball is also fairly a big sport in the city, including the clubs Malbas and SF Srbija among others.

Women are permitted by the city council to swim topless in public swimming pools. Everyone must wear bathing attire, but covering of the breasts is not mandatory.

== Twin towns and sister cities ==
Malmö has relations with the following cities:

- Port Adelaide Enfield, Australia
- Stralsund, Germany
- Szczecin, Poland
- Tallinn, Estonia
- Tangshan, China
- Vaasa, Finland
- Varna, Bulgaria

== Notable events ==
Venue	Event
Malmö Stadion	FIFA World Cup 1958; UEFA Euro 1992
Baltic Hall	Table Tennis European Championships 1964; IHF World Men's Handball Championships 1967; Davis Cup 1996; Men's World Floorball Championships 2006; European Women's Handball Championships 2006; Men's World Floorball Championships 2024
Malmö Isstadion	Eurovision Song Contest 1992; European Figure Skating Championships 2003; World Junior Ice Hockey Championships 2014
Eleda Stadion	UEFA European Under-21 Football Championships 2009
Malmö Arena	World Men's Handball Championships 2011; Eurovision Song Contest 2013; Eurovision Song Contest 2024; Men's World Floorball Championships 2024; 2025 World Table Tennis Series (Europe Smash); 2026 European Men's Handball Championship

== See also ==
- Malmö Bulltofta Airport
- Chronicle of the Expulsion of the Greyfriars § Chapter 4 Concerning the Friary in Malmø
- List of governors of Malmöhus County
- Ports of the Baltic Sea
- Thin Blue Line (Swedish TV series), a 2021 TV series set in Malmö
- SS Malmö, ships named for the city
- Elisabeth Nilsson
