= Church of Our Saviour, Malmö =

Coordinates: 55.5974°N 12.9919°E

Church of Our Saviour
- Vår Frälsares katolska församling
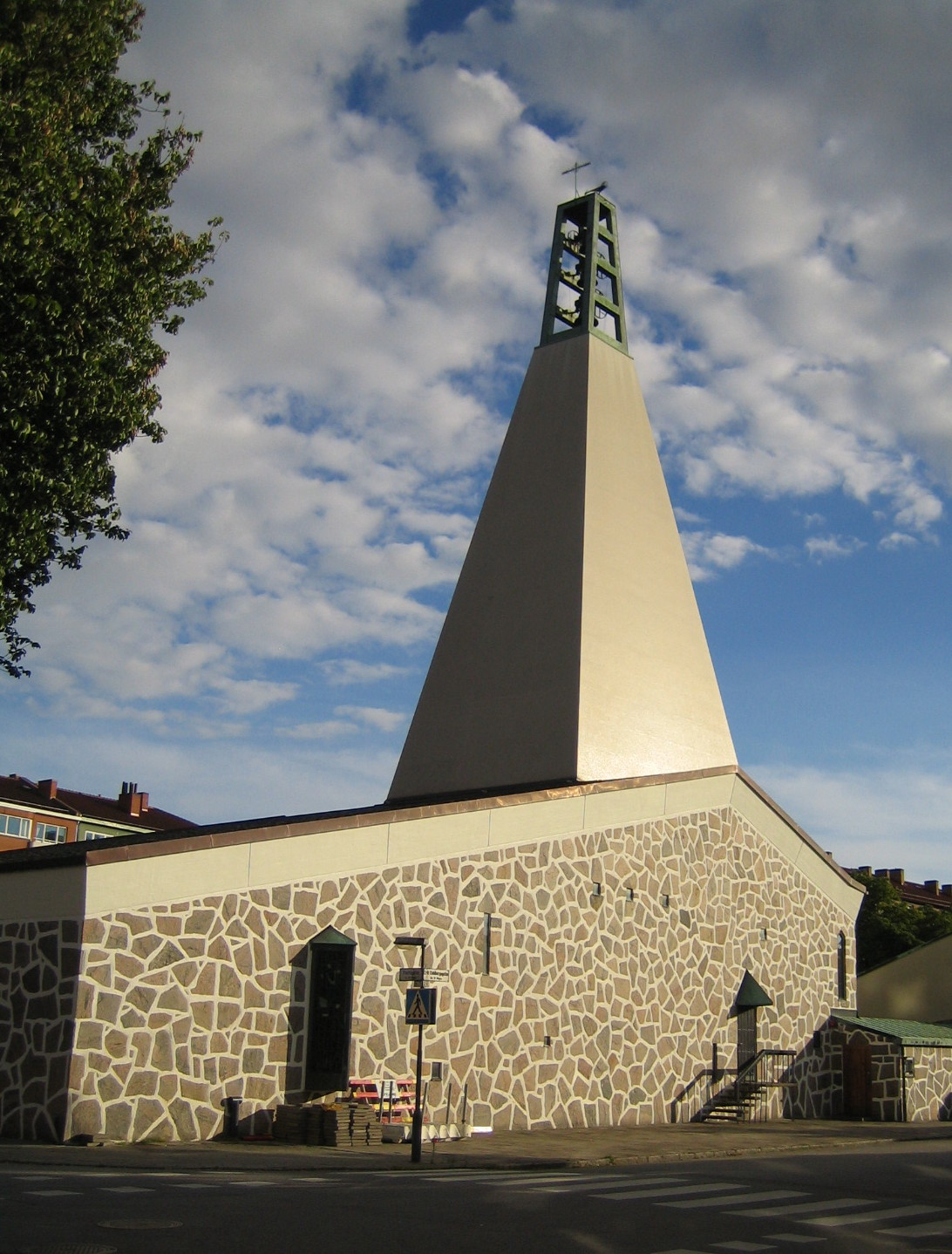
- Church of Our Saviour
- Location: Malmö
- Country: Sweden
- Denomination: Roman Catholic Church

The Church of Our Saviour (Swedish: Vår Frälsares katolska församling) (which means "Catholic Parish of Our Savior") is the name given to a religious building belonging to the Catholic Church and is located in the center of the city of Malmö in the province of Skåne in Sweden. It belongs to the Catholic Diocese of Stockholm (Stockholms Katolska Stif). The congregation was founded in 1870 and its first vicar was Bernhard zu Stolberg.

Between 1872 and 1960 there was a parish church, where the Raoul Wallenberg park is now located at the corner of Gustav Adolfs torg. It was first called Church of the Sacred Heart of Jesus, but because the name was perceived as a "Catholic provocation" the name was changed to "our Saviour." The church became too small, so a new one was built in Hästhagen. The new church, which was designed by Hans Westman, was inaugurated on 9 April 1960, by the Rev. Bernhard Koch. The old church at the other location was demolished the same year.

== See also ==
- Roman Catholicism in Sweden
- Roman Catholic Diocese of Stockholm
