= Sven Nilsson =

Sven Nilsson may refer to:

- Sven Nilsson (zoologist) (1787–1883), Swedish zoologist and archaeologist
- Sven Nilsson (footballer) (1909–1983), Swedish football player and manager
- Sven Gösta Nilsson (1927–1979), Swedish theoretical physicist
