= Andreas Nilsson =

Andreas Nilsson may refer to:

- Andreas Nilsson (film director), Swedish film director
- Andreas Nilsson (actor), Swedish actor and voice actor
- Andreas Nilsson (handballer) (born 1990), Swedish handball player
- Andreas Nilsson (footballer) (1910–2011), Swedish footballer
- Andreas Nilsson (racing driver), Swedish racing driver
