= Nils Nilsson =

Nils Nilsson may refer to:

- Nils Nilsson (art director) (1919–1981), Swedish film set designer
- Nils John Nilsson (1933–2019), artificial intelligence researcher
- Nils Nilsson (ice hockey) (1936–2017), Swedish ice hockey player and footballer
- Nils Nilsson (wrestler) (1899–1961), Swedish Olympic wrestler
- Nils Heribert-Nilsson (1883–1955), Swedish botanist and geneticist
- Nils Oskar Nilsson (1935–2018), Swedish politician of the Moderate Party
