= Elisabeth Nilsson (lawyer) =

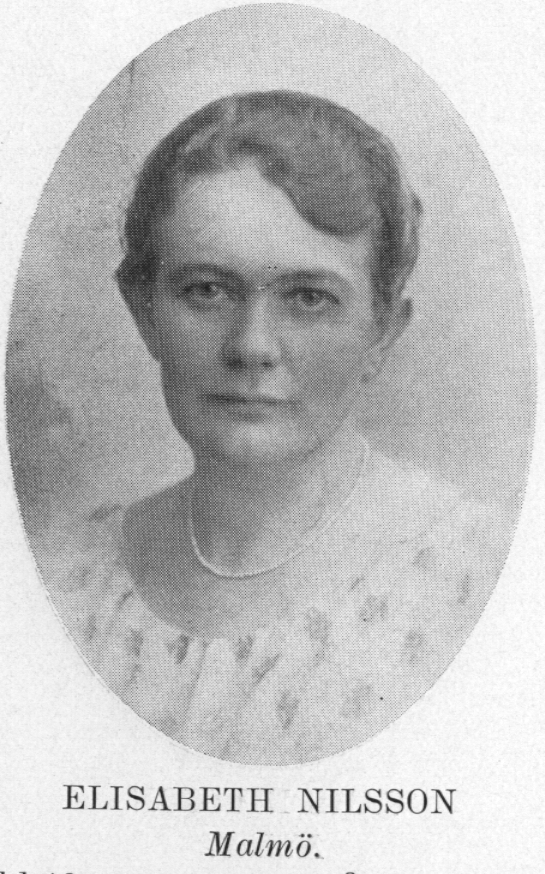
- Born: Nilla Elisabeth Nilsson; 1878
- Died: 1941
- Occupation(s): Lawyer, suffragist

Nilla Elisabeth Nilsson (1878–1941) was a Swedish lawyer and suffragist.

She was the first female lawyer interacting in Malmö, where she opened her practice in 1916.

She was active in the campaign for the introduction of women's suffrage in Sweden and served as chairperson of the Association for Women's Suffrage in Malmö from 1917 to 1921.
