= Västra Innerstaden =

- Former city district
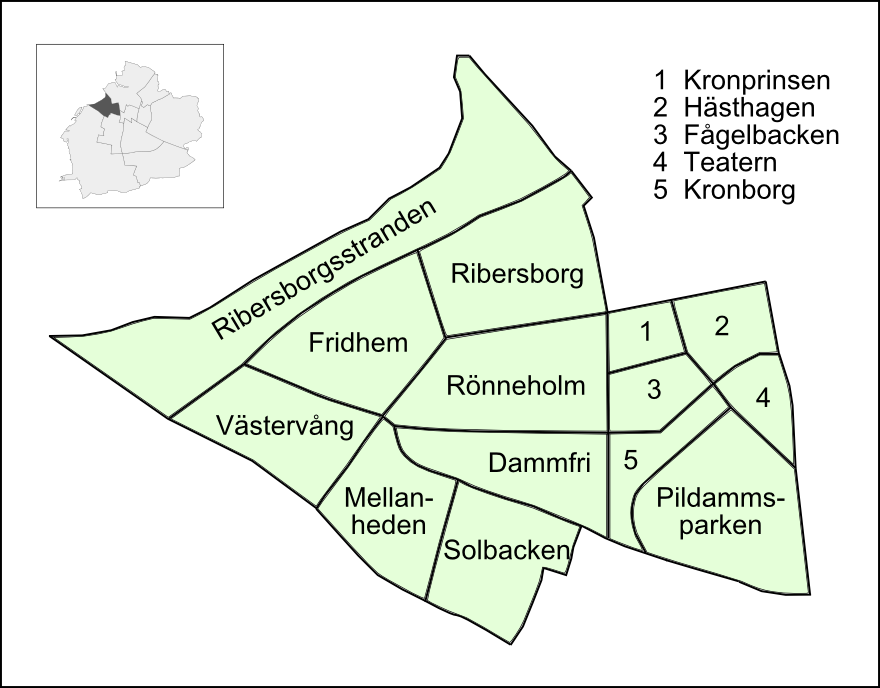
- Västra Innerstaden's neighbourhoods
- Country: Sweden
- Province: Scania
- County: Skåne County
- Municipality: Malmö Municipality

Area
  - Total: 465 ha (1,150 acres)

Population (2012)
  - Total: 33,191
  - Density: 7,140/km^{2} (18,500/sq mi)
- Time zone: UTC+01:00 (CET)
  - Summer (DST): UTC+02:00 (CEST)

Västra Innerstaden was a city district (Swedish: stadsdel) in the west-central of Malmö Municipality, Sweden. On 1 July 2013, it was merged with Södra Innerstaden, forming Innerstaden. In 2012, Västra Innerstaden had a population of 33,191 of the municipality's 307,758. The area was 465 hectares.

== Neighbourhoods ==
The neighbourhoods of Västra Innerstaden were:

- Dammfri
- Fridhem
- Fågelbacken
- Hästhagen
- Kronborg
- Kronprinsen
- Mellanheden
- Pildammsparken
- Ribersborg
- Ribersborgsstranden
- Rönneholm
- Solbacken
- Teatern
- Västervång

== Demographics ==
Västra Innerstaden is one of the more homogenous parts of Malmö with the lowest number of people born abroad: 12%, compared to Malmö's average of 29%:

The ten largest groups of foreign-born persons in 2009 were:

1. Denmark (524)
2. Poland (418)
3. Germany (234)
4. (Socialist Federal Republic of Yugoslavia) Former Yugoslavia (212)
5. Finland (210)
6. Iran (142)
7. United States (130)
8. United Kingdom (123)
9. Hungary (106)
10. Norway (101)
