= Ribersborg =

- Neighbourhood
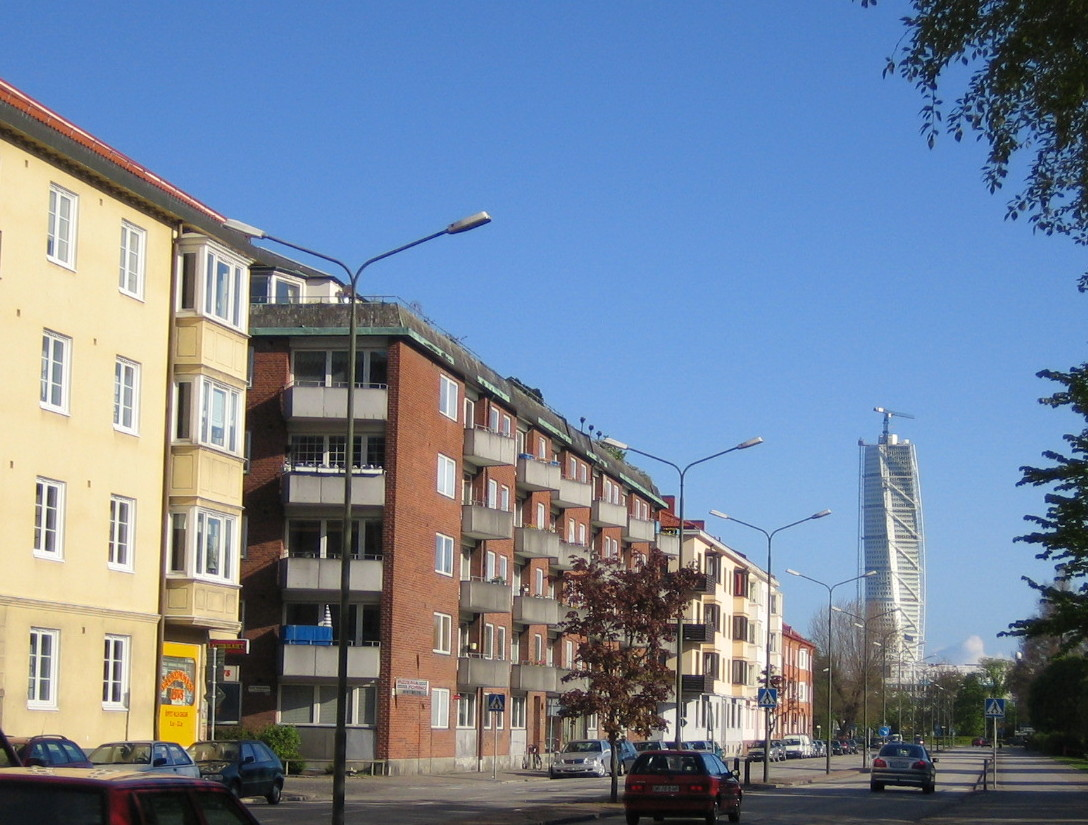
- Interactive map of Ribersborg
- Coordinates: 55°36′04″N 12°58′37″E
- Country: Sweden
- Province: Skåne
- County: Skåne County
- Municipality: Malmö Municipality
- Borough of Malmö: Västra Innerstaden

Population (1 January 2011)
  - Total: 8,362
- Time zone: UTC+1 (CET)
  - Summer (DST): UTC+2 (CEST)

Ribersborg is a neighbourhood of Malmö, Sweden, situated in the Borough of Västra Innerstaden (Western City Centre), Malmö Municipality, Skåne County.

At its seaside, there is the Ribersborgs kallbadhus, a protected historic wooden pier used for open-air bathing and sauna use.
