= Sankt Petri skola =

Coordinates: 55.599444°N 12.994444°E

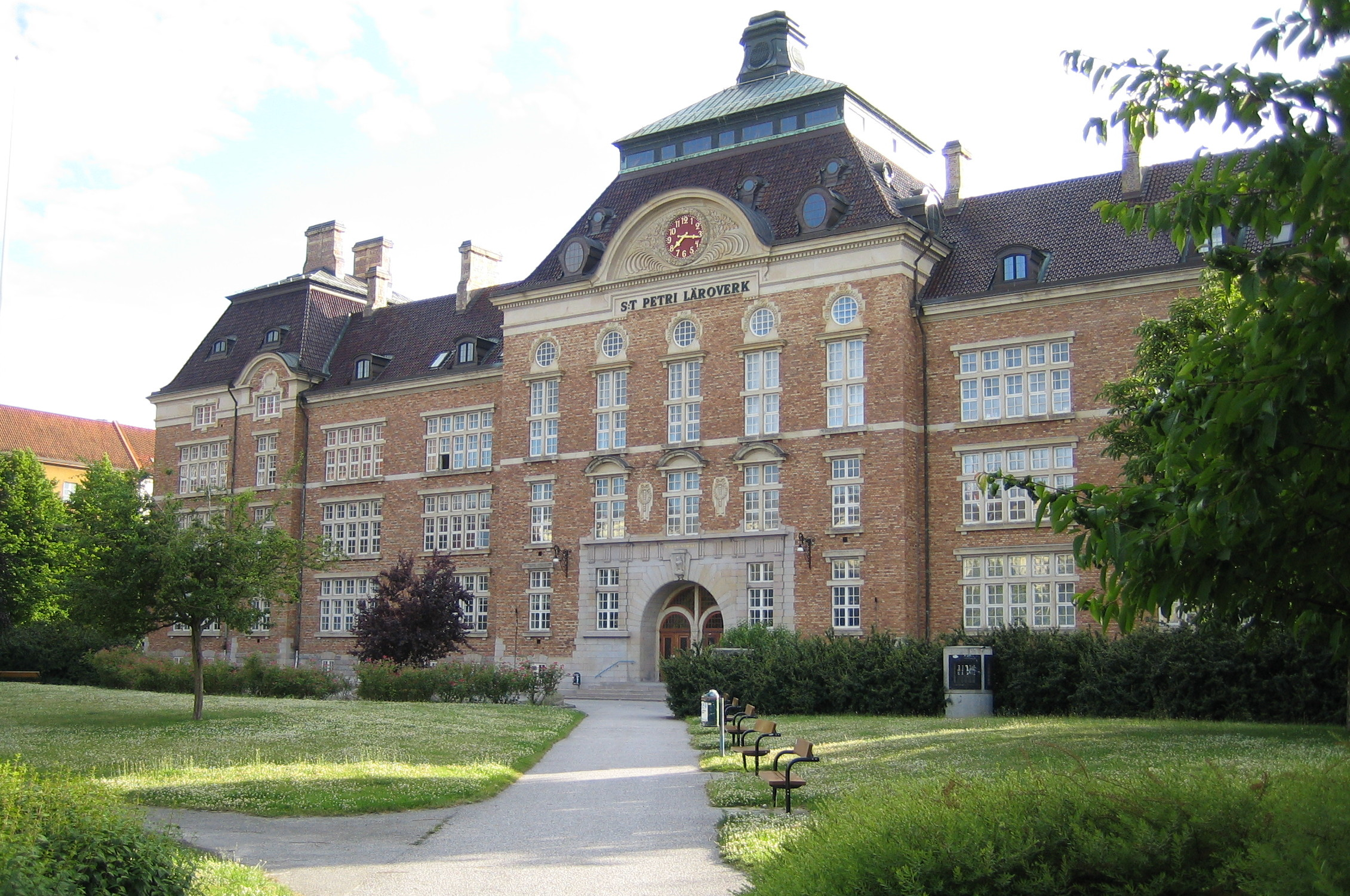
- The school building from 1908
- Malmö; Sweden

Information
- Established: 1908
- Principal: Eva Daun
- Website: Sankt Petri skola

Sankt Petri skola is a municipal school and secondary school located on Fersens väg in the Hästhagen district in central Malmö, Sweden. The school was built between 1904 and 1908 and is one of Malmö's oldest and largest secondary schools.

The students are colloquially known as "Petriots." In 2020, the school had students enrolled in two different educational programs.

== History ==
The school was founded in 1902 as Malmö allmänna lägre läroverk. From 1952, the school also included a municipal upper school.

When the nationalization of upper secondary school began in 1958, the school was renamed St. Petri Upper School. In 1966, the school was municipalized and its name changed to Sankt Petri skola. Between 1956 and 1968, students could take the Reifeprüfung and between 1912 and 1965 the Abitur.

The current school building was inaugurated in 1908. The architect was John Smedberg, and the building shows features of a German Baroque palace. The building had insufficient ventilation, which was the main reason for a major renovation in 2008–2009. During the renovation, classes were temporarily held at the old Pildamm School. After the renovation, teaching resumed in the original building in autumn 2009.

The current principal is Eva Daun.

== Notable alumni ==
Mikael Wiehe (born 1946), musician, singer, songwriter, translator, and composer Yngve Sjöström (1944–2023), jazz musician and radio presenter Carl Fabian Biörck (1893–1977), gymnast and athlete Birte Christoffersen (born 1924), diver
