= St. John's Church, Malmö =

20th-century church in Malmö, Sweden

St. John's Church
- S:t Johannes kyrka
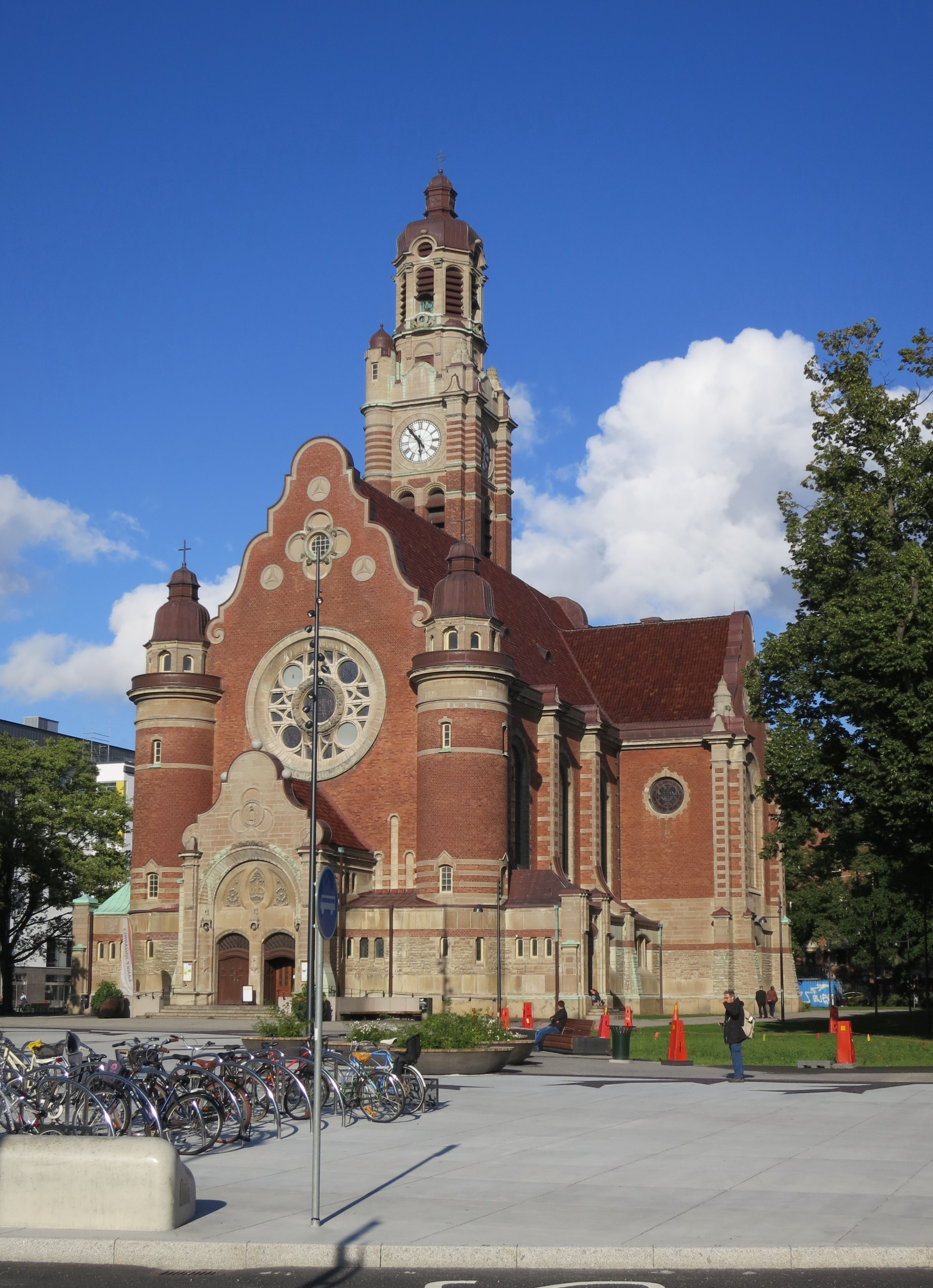
- St. John's Church, August 2014
- St. John's Church
- 55.594167°N 13.001667°E
- Location: Innerstaden, Malmö
- Country: Sweden
- Denomination: Lutheran, Church of Sweden
- Website: sanktjohannes.se

Architecture
- Architect: Axel Anderberg
- Style: Jugend
- Years built: 1903-1906

Administration
- Diocese: Diocese of Lund
- Parish: St. John's Parish

St. John's Church (Swedish: S:t Johannes kyrka) is a church located near Triangeln in the Innerstaden district of Malmö, Sweden. It was designed by Axel Anderberg in the Jugend style and built in 1903–1907.

== History ==
In 1901 the drawings were approved for a new church, which would relieve St. Peter's and St. Paul's parishes, where the population growth was large. Construction started in 1903, with a planned completion date of 1906, which was when St. John's Parish was founded. (That year is engraved in the sandstone above the main entrance). However, construction was delayed and the parish had to hold their first services in St. Paul's Church. The church was finally inaugurated by Bishop Gottfrid Billing on Holy Trinity Day, 1 June 1907. Designed in the Art Nouveau style, the church distinguishes itself considerably from those built in the new Gothic style around the same time. Art Nouveau had just become fashionable in Sweden and followed the National Romantic currents of the time. Architecturally, the Art Nouveau style meant soft, rounded forms and St. John's Church certainly shows examples of this.

== Architecture ==
The church was erected in red brick on a granite base and the roof has enamel tiling. In all, there are approximately 20 different kinds of natural stone in the church's ornaments. To mark the arrival of a new era, the architect did not place the tower and the armoury on the west, as was the tradition, but on the north side of the church, just beside the sanctuary.

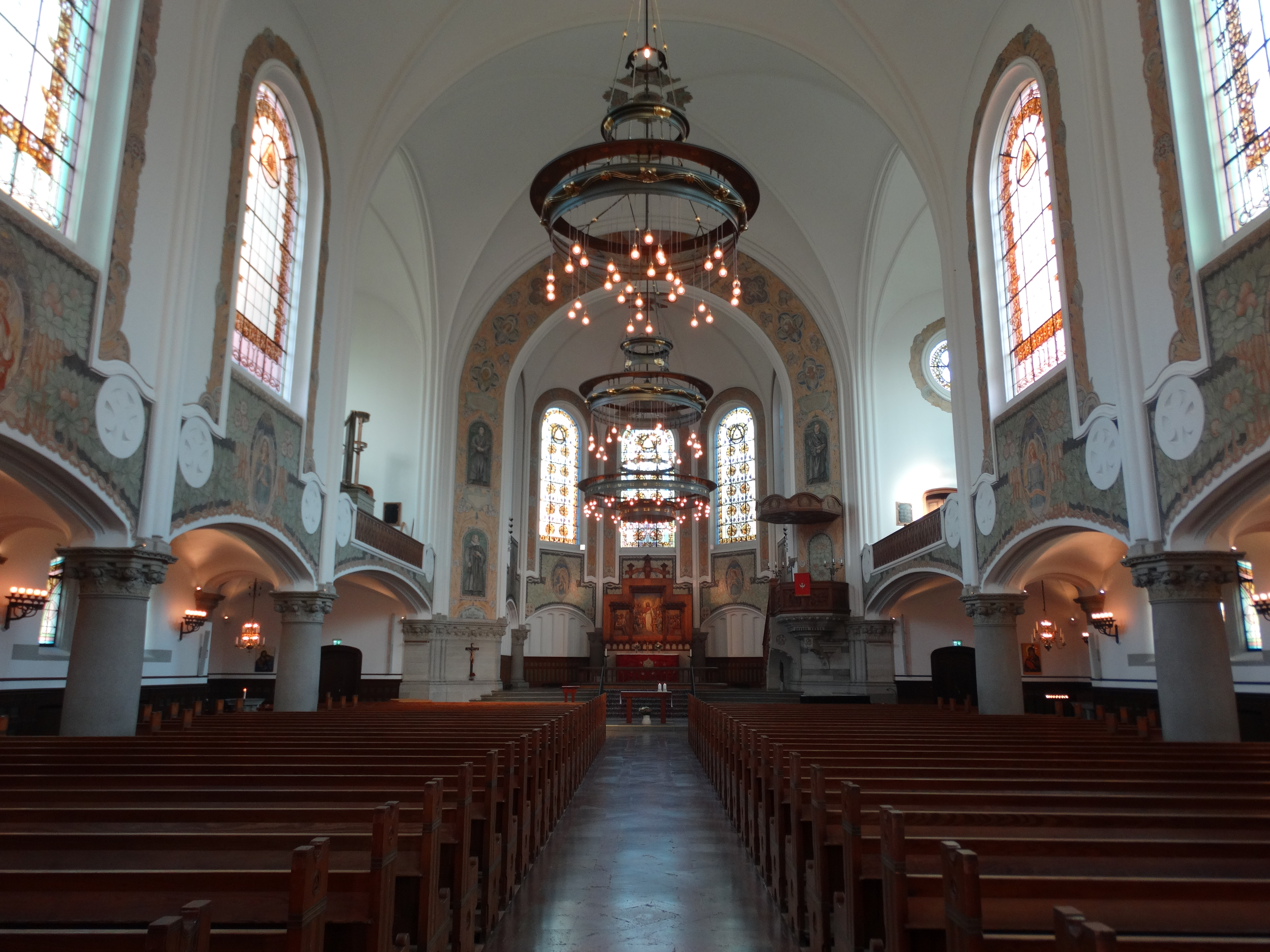
St. John Church in Malmo (inner view)

=== The Pulpit ===
On the pulpit, there are five sections which are made of oak, carved by the sculptor Carl Andersson. These carvings are a description of the life of Jesus, showing the stable with Mother Mary and the Child Jesus, Jesus at the age of twelve in the temple, Jesus' baptism, the bearing of the cross and Jesus leaving the open grave.
