= Johnny Örbäck =

Swedish businessman

Carl Wilhelm Johnny Örbäck (born May 29, 1952) is a former head of the Malmö, Sweden division of the company HSB, who was the driving force behind the construction of Scandinavia's tallest structure "Turning Torso" designed by Santiago Calatrava.

The immense structure was beset by construction defects since it was the first attempt to build such an unusually shaped building. Due to massive cost overruns, Örbäck was forced out as head of the company. Many people criticized his attempt to build high-priced luxurious housing in Malmö, since it went against HSB's socialist roots. He defended it by comparing it to a Formula-1 car, which is expensive and unique but creates innovations which eventually are passed on to mass-produced cars. Likewise, he hoped Turning Torso would become the new standard in the future for middle-class homes. According to a film aired recently on the LINK channel, Örbäck was eventually forced out of the project, which experienced massive cost overruns.

In 2007, Johnny Örbäck was together with another former HSB executive and a former real estate agent from Helsingborg taken to trial on charges of fraud against HSB. On 12 December 2007, all three were sentenced to 18 months in prison, having caused HSB losses of 38 million Swedish crowns.

However, when the case in 2008 was reviewed in the appellate court of Sweden, Johnny Örbäck and other parties were acquitted from all charges.
