= Christmas Hurricane of 1902 =

1902 windstorm in Denmark and Sweden

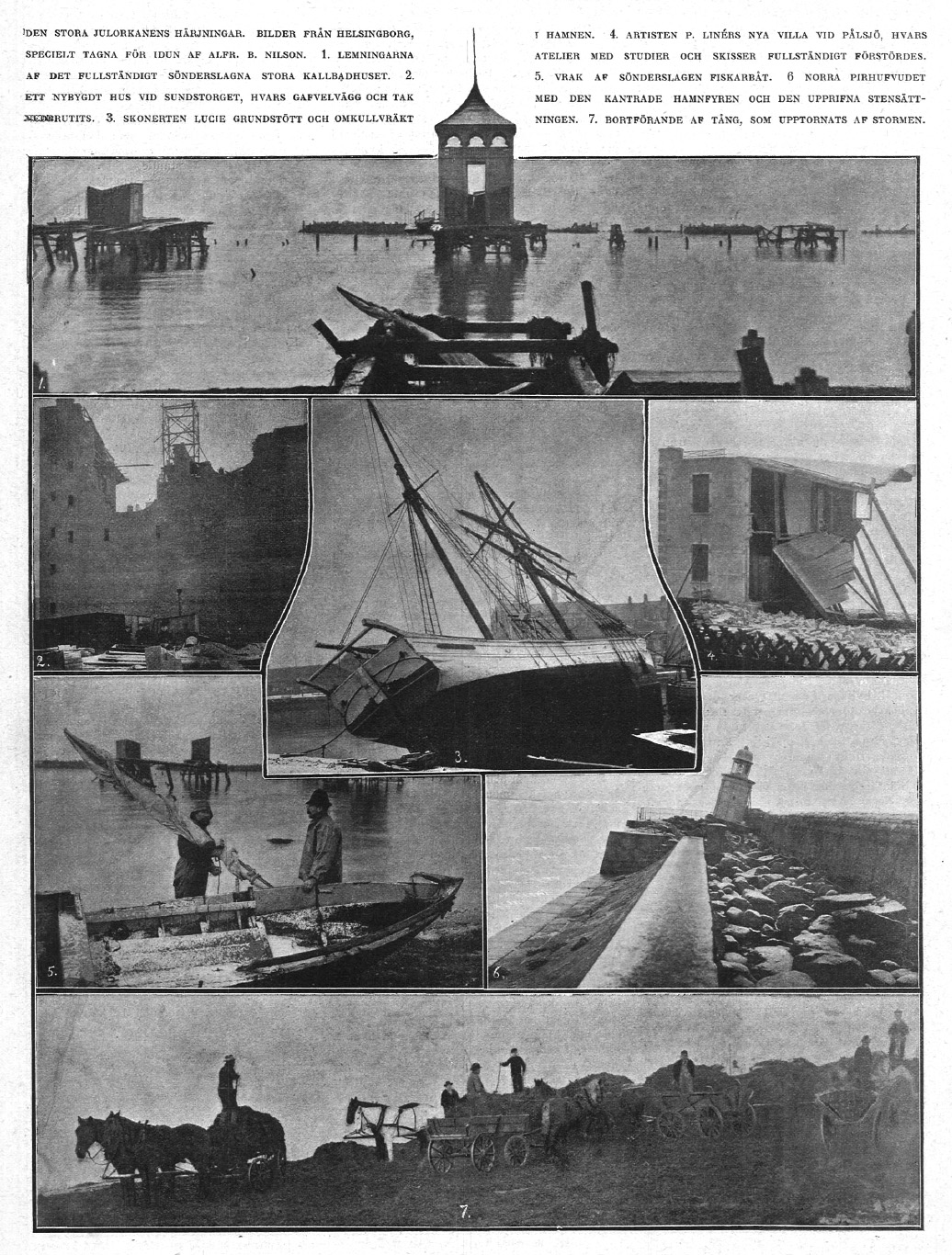
- 1903 collage in the Idun magazine from the storm

Meteorological history
- Formed: 24 December 1902
- Dissipated: 26 December 1902

European windstorm

Overall effects
- Areas affected: Denmark, Sweden

The Christmas Hurricane of 1902 (Danish: Julestormen 1902, Swedish: Julorkanen 1902) was a strong European windstorm which struck Denmark and Sweden on 25 December 1902.

In Sweden, it hit Scania, parts of southern Kronoberg County and the west coast. Around 50 fishermen were killed, while very few people on land were killed. Material damages, measured in millions of Swedish crowns, were reported. The storm destroyed, among other things, open-air baths in Varberg, Mölle and Malmö (one in Ribersborgsstranden – the Ribersborgs open-air bath – and one in Sibbarp), and the Örgryte Church tower spire fell off.
