= List of shipwrecks in August 1847 =

The list of shipwrecks in August 1847 includes ships sunk, foundered, wrecked, grounded, or otherwise lost during August 1847.

== 1 August ==
List of shipwrecks: 1 August 1847
Ship	State	Description
Earl Grey	United Kingdom	The ship ran aground and was wrecked at Staithes, Yorkshire. Her crew were rescued.
Harbinger	United Kingdom	The sloop foundered in the North Sea off Wells-next-the-Sea, Norfolk.
John Howell	United States	The schooner caught fire in the Atlantic Ocean (35°00′N 71°45′W) and was abandoned. Her crew were rescued by Pharsalia (United States). John Howell was on a voyage from New York to a port in Florida. She exploded and sank.
Ouistiti	France	The brig ran aground off Antigua. She was refloated but was consequently beached the next day on Barbuda. Her crew were rescued. She was on a voyage from Guadeloupe to Havre de Grâce, Seine-Inférieure.
Smyrna	United States	The ship was wrecked on a reef north of the Caicos Islands. Her crew were rescued. She was on a voyage from Bordeaux, Gironde, France to New Orleans, Louisiana.

== 2 August ==
List of shipwrecks: 2 August 1847
Ship	State	Description
Amelia	United Kingdom	The ship was driven ashore and wrecked on the Piccaninny Bassara. She was on a voyage from Bristol, Gloucestershire to the west coast of Africa.
Emma	United Kingdom British North America	The brig departed from Pictou, Nova Scotia for Boston, Massachusetts, United States. No further trace, presumed foundered with the loss of all hands.
Governor Gawler	United Kingdom South Australia	The ship was wrecked near Port Lincoln. All on board were rescued.

== 3 August ==
List of shipwrecks: 3 August 1847
Ship	State	Description
Buchanan	United Kingdom	The ship was wrecked on the Swinebottoms. She was on a voyage from Stockton-on-Tees, County Durham to Swinemünde, Prussia.
Cornuba	(United Kingdom of Great Britain and Ireland) New South Wales	The steamship ran aground at Port Phillip.
Maria	United Kingdom	The smack foundered off Ballantrae, Ayrshire. Her crew survived. She was on a voyage from Lamlash, Isle of Arran to Ballantrae.
Primer Gaditano	Spain	The steamship ran aground at Europa Point, Gibraltar. She was on a voyage from Marseille, Bouches-du-Rhône, France to Cádiz. She was refloated and beached at Algeciras.

== 5 August ==
List of shipwrecks: 5 August 1847
Ship	State	Description
Carib	Portugal	The ship was driven ashore at Montevideo, Uruguay. She was refloated.
Devonport	United Kingdom	The ship was driven ashore near Amsterdam, North Holland, Netherlands.
Fame	United States	The brig was driven ashore at "Holmes Isle Harbour". She was on a voyage from New York to Saint John's, Newfoundland, British North America.
Grefvre Rehbinder	Russia	The ship was driven ashore in the Dardanelles. She was on a voyage from Odesa to Cork or Falmouth, Cornwall, United Kingdom.
Leila	United Kingdom	The ship foundered in the Atlantic Ocean. Her crew were rescued. She was on a voyage from New York, United States to Cork.
Marys	United Kingdom	The ship was driven ashore at St. James's Castle, Smyrna, Ottoman Empire. She was on a voyage from Smyrna to Cork. She was refloated and resumed her voyage.

== 6 August ==
List of shipwrecks: 6 August 1847
Ship	State	Description
Isabella	United Kingdom	The schooner was discovered abandoned in the Irish Sea. She was towed in to Ramsey, Isle of Man in a derelict condition by the lugger Sea Horse ( (United Kingdom of Great Britain and Ireland) Isle of Man).
Magnus	United Kingdom	The brig was driven ashore and wrecked on Partridge Island, Nova Scotia, British North America.
Margaret and Hope	United States	The ship collided with the brig Condova (United States) and sank off Cape Ann, Massachusetts. All on board were rescued. She was on a voyage from Windsor to Boston.

== 7 August ==
List of shipwrecks: 7 August 1847
Ship	State	Description
Albion	United Kingdom	The ship ran aground on the Romer Shoal. She was on a voyage from Pictou, Nova Scotia, British North America to New York. She was refloated and beached on the Horse Shoe.
Charles Humberton	United States	The ship was driven ashore and wrecked east of Calais, France. All 260 people on board were rescued. She was on a voyage from Rotterdam, South Holland, Netherlands to New York, United States.
Enterprize	United Kingdom	The ship was struck a rock in Loch Bay and was beached on the Isle of Skye, Outer Hebrides. She was on a voyage from Arkhangelsk, Russia to the Clyde.
Juverna	United Kingdom	The barque ran aground in the Saint Lawrence River. She was on a voyage from Quebec City, Province of Canada, British North America to London. She was refloated the next day and put back to Quebec City.
Rosebud	United Kingdom	The ship ran aground on the Fahludd Reef, off Gotland, Sweden. She was on a voyage from Saint Petersburg, Russia to Inverness. She was refloated and taken in to Slitohamn for repairs.
Trois Amis	France	The ship foundered in the North Sea. She was on a voyage from Stockholm, Sweden to Saint-Malo, Ille-et-Vilaine.

== 8 August ==
List of shipwrecks: 8 August 1847
Ship	State	Description
Cisne Alsina	United States	The ship departed from New York for Barcelona, Spain. No further trace, presumed foundered with the loss of all hands.
Mary	United Kingdom	The ship was lost at the mouth of the Elbe. Her crew were rescued. She was on a voyage from Newcastle upon Tyne, Northumberland to Hamburg.
Midge	(United Kingdom of Great Britain and Ireland) Antigua	The drogher was wrecked on Montserrat. She was on a voyage from Antigua to Montserrat.
Stalkart	India	The ship was wrecked at Saugor. She was on a voyage from Calcutta to London.
Swiftsure	United Kingdom	The schooner or steamship was driven ashore and wrecked in Plettenberg Bay. Her crew were rescued.
Triumph	(United Kingdom of Great Britain and Ireland) British North America	The brig was wrecked on Grand Cay. She was on a voyage from Barbados to the Turks Islands.

== 9 August ==
List of shipwrecks: 9 August 1847
Ship	State	Description
Foigh-a-Ballagh	United Kingdom	The ship was wrecked on the West Reef, off Brian Island. She was on a voyage from Quebec City, Province of Canada, British North America to Dublin.
Iduna	Sweden	The barque collided with Shanunga (United States) and foundered in the Atlantic Ocean (44°25′N 58°30′W) with the loss of 173 lives. There were 34 survivors; they were rescued by Shanunga. Iduna was on a voyage from Hamburg to New York, United States.
Margaret	United Kingdom	The brig ran aground on the Inner Shoal, in the North Sea off the coast of Suffolk. She was refloated and resumed her voyage.
Martin	United Kingdom	The sloop was driven ashore at Bowmore, Islay, Inner Hebrides.

== 10 August ==
List of shipwrecks: 10 August 1847
Ship	State	Description
City of Cork	United Kingdom	The ship departed from Callao, Peru for Liverpool, Lancashire. No further trace, presumed foundered with the loss of all hands.
Edouard	Prussia	The barque capsized in the River Mersey at Liverpool with the loss of three lives. She was on a voyage from Danzig to Liverpool. She was righted the next day and taken in to Liverpool.
Fingal	United Kingdom	The ship ran aground and broke her back at Liverpool.
Gloire	French Navy	The Artemise-class frigate was wrecked on Ko-koon-to Island, Korea (35°47′N 126°21′E).
Levant	United Kingdom	The ship was wrecked on Anticosti Island, Nova Scotia, British North America. Her crew were rescued. She was on a voyage from Greenock, Renfrewshire to Quebec City, Province of Canada, British North America.
Victorieuse	French Navy	The Victorieuse-class corvette was wrecked on Ko-koon-to Island.

== 11 August ==
List of shipwrecks: 11 August 1847
Ship	State	Description
City of Derry	United Kingdom	The ship was driven ashore and wrecked on Île Bicquette, Province of Canada, British North America to London.
Stephanie	France	The ship sprang a leak and put in to Reval, Russia in a sinking condition. She was on a voyage from Saint Petersburg, Russia to Saint-Valery-sur-Somme.
Sussex	United Kingdom	The ship capsized at Cardiff, Glamorgan.
Wellington	United Kingdom	The ship struck a sunken rock and foundered in the Bristol Channel off Llanddwyn, Glamorgan.

== 12 August ==
List of shipwrecks: 12 August 1847
Ship	State	Description
Carrier	(United Kingdom of Great Britain and Ireland) Grenada	The cutter ran aground on a reef off Grenville.
Jessie Thoms	Norway	The ship ran aground on the Newcombe Sand, in the North Sea off the coast of Suffolk, United Kingdom. She was on a voyage from Saint Petersburg, Russia to London. She was refloated and resumed her voyage.
Prince of Waterloo	United Kingdom	The ship was driven ashore and wrecked on Anticosti Island, Nova Scotia, British North America. She was on a voyage from Quebec City, Province of Canada, British North America to Aberdeen.
Sultana	United Kingdom	The cutter was wrecked in the Rio Grande. Her crew were rescued.

== 13 August ==
List of shipwrecks: 13 August 1847
Ship	State	Description
Bordelais	United Kingdom	The ship was wrecked on the Rocques, off the coast of Venezuela. She was on a voyage from La Guaira, Venezuela to Bordeaux, Gironde.
Neptune	Russia	The barque was wrecked on the Skirgaitch Rock, off the Isle of Glass. Her crew were rescued. Neptune was on a voyage from Kronstadt to Liverpool, Lancashire, United Kingdom. She came ashore at Stere Head, Sutherland, United Kingdom.

== 14 August ==
List of shipwrecks: 14 August 1847
Ship	State	Description
Collyria	(United Kingdom of Great Britain and Ireland) British North America	The ship was driven ashore on Grand Manan, Fundy Islands, Nova Scotia. She was on a voyage from Boston, Massachusetts to Windsor, Nova Scotia. She was wrecked the next day.
Muta	United Kingdom	The brig was wrecked on the Nore. Her crew were rescued. She was refloated on 26 August and taken in to Sheerness, Kent.
Naiad	United States	The ship was abandoned in the Atlantic Ocean. Her crew were rescued by Swan (United Kingdom). Naiad was on a voyage from New Bedford, Massachusetts to the Cape Verde Islands.
Union	United Kingdom	The ship sprang a leak and sank in the Thames Estuary. She was on a voyage from London to Whitstable, Kent.

== 15 August ==
List of shipwrecks: 15 August 1847
Ship	State	Description
London	United Kingdom	The ship ran aground on the Nore. She was refloated and resumed her voyage.
Mamlouk	United States	The ship capsized and sank in the Atlantic Ocean during a squall with the loss of 42 of the 64 people on board. Survivors were rescued on 17 August by the brig Belize (United Kingdom). Mamlouk was on her maiden voyage, from New York to Liverpool, Lancashire, United Kingdom.
Prins Carl	Netherlands	The ship ran aground off Ameland, Friesland. She was on a voyage from Saint Petersburg, Russia to Ameland. She was refloated and taken in to Amsterdam.
HMS Torch	Royal Navy	The paddle gunvessel ran aground in the Sound of Sanda. She was refloated the next day with assistance from HMS Porcupine (Royal Navy) and taken in to Campbeltown, Argyllshire in a leaky condition.
Theresa	(United Kingdom of Great Britain and Ireland) South Australia	The ship was wrecked off "Cape Balmac". Her crew were rescued. She was on a voyage from Adelaide to Hong Kong.

== 16 August ==
List of shipwrecks: 16 August 1847
Ship	State	Description
Theresa	United Kingdom	The ship was wrecked on Cape Bolinao, Spanish East Indies. Her crew were rescued. She was on a voyage from Hong Kong to Manila, Spanish East Indies.

== 18 August ==
List of shipwrecks: 18 August 1847
Ship	State	Description
Barbara	United Kingdom	The ship was driven ashore on Imbros, Ottoman Empire. She was on a voyage from Enos, Ottoman Empire to a British port. She was refloated on 25 August.
Emilie	Danzig	The ship ran aground on the Burbo Bank, in Liverpool Bay and was damaged. She was on a voyage from Danzig to Liverpool, Lancashire, United Kingdom. She was refloated and taken in to Liverpool.
Gloire	French Navy	The frigate was wrecked on an island off the west coast of Korea. Her crew survived.
Victorieuse	French Navy	The frigate was wrecked on an island off the west coast of Korea. Her crew survived.

== 19 August ==
List of shipwrecks: 19 August 1847
Ship	State	Description
Garland	(United Kingdom of Great Britain and Ireland) British North America	The ship was driven ashore on Seal Island. She was on a voyage from Boston, Massachusetts, United States to Pictou, Nova Scotia. She was refloated and taken in to Pubnico, Nova Scotia.
Lady of Sark	(United Kingdom of Great Britain and Ireland) Guernsey	The cutter was struck by lightning and sank at Sark, Channel Islands.

== 20 August ==
List of shipwrecks: 20 August 1847
Ship	State	Description
Isabella	Bremen	The ship ran aground in the Dardanelles. She was refloated.
Marie Françoise	France	The ship sank near Concarneau, Finistère.
Mary and Jane	United Kingdom	The ship was driven ashore at Donegal.
Millman	United Kingdom	The ship ran aground on a reef off "Turnell". She was on a voyage from Belize City, British Honduras to Liverpool, Lancashire. She was refloated and resumed her voyage.
Rambler	(United Kingdom of Great Britain and Ireland) New South Wales	The schooner departed from Sydney for Twofold Bay. No further trace, presumed foundered with the loss of all hands.

== 21 August ==
List of shipwrecks: 21 August 1847
Ship	State	Description
Aid	United Kingdom	The ship was driven ashore at Tobermory, Isle of Mull, Inner Hebrides. She was on a voyage from Glasgow, Renfrewshire to Stettin. She was refloated the next day and taken in to Tobermory in a leaky condition.
John	United Kingdom	The ship was driven ashore 3 nautical miles (5.6 km) north east of Maryport, Cumberland.
Lowestoft	(United Kingdom of Great Britain and Ireland) New Zealand	The brigantine was wrecked in the Chatham Islands. She was on a voyage from Wangaroa to Port Nicholson.
Mary	United Kingdom	The ship was driven ashore at Eastness, Forfarshire.
Mary Clark	United Kingdom	The ship was driven out to sea from Tobermory and foundered. She was on a voyage from Troon, Ayrshire to Tiree, Inner Hebrides.
Mary Eliza	United Kingdom	The ship was wrecked at St Thomas, Jamaica. She was on a voyage from Kingston, Jamaica to Liverpool, Lancashire.

== 22 August ==
List of shipwrecks: 22 August 1847
Ship	State	Description
Britannia	United Kingdom	The ship was wrecked at Thurso, Caithness with the loss of two of her crew. She was on a voyage from Saint Petersburg, Russia to Belfast, County Antrim.
Canton	United Kingdom	The barque was wrecked at Farrouthead, Sutherland with the loss of all twenty people on board.
Lively	United Kingdom	The sloop was driven ashore and abandoned at Fraserburgh, Aberdeenshire. All four people on board were rescued by rocket apparatus.
Louise Marie	(Belgium) Belgian Navy	The schooner was driven ashore at Cromarty, Scotland. She was refloated with assistance from Griffon (French Navy).
Mary	United Kingdom	The ship was driven ashore at East Ness, Forfarshire.
Reform	United Kingdom	The sloop was wrecked in Loch Boisdale with the loss of two of her crew.
Thompsons	United Kingdom	The ship was wrecked on the East Gar, in the North Sea off the coast of County Durham.
Triad	United Kingdom	The ship was driven ashore and wrecked near Thurso. Her crew were rescued. She was on a voyage from Leith, Lothian to the Isle of Skye.
Ulster	United Kingdom	The ship was driven ashore at Donaghadee, County Down. She was on a voyage from New York, United States to Belfast, County Antrim.
William and Mary	United Kingdom	The ship collided with a brig and sank in the North Sea off Happisburgh, Norfolk. Her crew were rescued.

== 23 August ==
List of shipwrecks: 23 August 1847
Ship	State	Description
Ann	United Kingdom	The ship was driven ashore at Fishguard, Pembrokeshire.
Bienfaisant	France	The ship was wrecked at Port-en-Bessin, Calvados. She was on a voyage from Chichester, Sussex, United Kingdom to Caen, Calvados.
Contest	United Kingdom	The ship was driven ashore near Balnakeil, Sutherland. Both crew were rescued. She was on a voyage from Wick, Caithness to Bangor, County Down.
Elizabeth	United Kingdom	The ship was driven ashore at Port Patrick, Wigtownshire.
William	(United Kingdom of Great Britain and Ireland) South Australia	The cutter was wrecked on Kangaroo Island. All on board survived.

== 24 August ==
List of shipwrecks: 24 August 1847
Ship	State	Description
Lochiel	United Kingdom	The brig was driven ashore and wrecked at Sandsend, Yorkshire. Her crew were rescued.
Petit Leocadie	France	The schooner capsized and sank off Camaret-sur-Mer, Finistère. She was on a voyage from Blyth, Northumberland, United Kingdom to Brest, Finistère. She had been refloated by 2 September and taken in to Camaret-sur-Mer.
Rhoda	United Kingdom	The ship departed from Gibraltar for Falmouth, Cornwall. No further trace, presumed foundered with the loss of all hands.

== 25 August ==
List of shipwrecks: 25 August 1847
Ship	State	Description
Margaret	United Kingdom	The ship departed from Liverpool, Lancashire for Danzig. No further trace, presumed foundered with the loss of all hands.
Meta	Wismar	The ship ran aground on the Ostergrund. She was on a voyage from Saint Petersburg, Russia to Antwerp, Belgium. She was refloated and taken in to Rönneholm, Malmö, Sweden.
Orion	United Kingdom	The ship was driven ashore and wrecked at Krasnaya Gorka, Russia. She was on a voyage from London to Saint Petersburg. Orion was refloated on 30 August and taken in to Saint Petersburg.
Sir John Franklin	United Kingdom	The ship ran aground off Gotland, Sweden. She was on a voyage from Saint Petersburg to London. She was refloated and taken in to "Burgeswick".

== 26 August ==
List of shipwrecks: 26 August 1847
Ship	State	Description
Alfred	United Kingdom	The ship was abandoned. Her crew were rescued She was on a voyage from Galaţi, Ottoman Empire to Waterford.
Atkinson	United Kingdom	The ship was driven ashore near "Steffano". She was later refloated.
Kate	United Kingdom	The ship was driven ashore and damaged on the Steilsand, in the North Sea. She was on a voyage from Hamburg to Penzance, Cornwall. She was refloated the next day and taken in to Cuxhaven for repairs.
Marion	United Kingdom	The ship ran aground off Ballywalter, County Down. She was on a voyage from the Clyde to Trinidad. She was refloated the next day and resumed her voyage.
Regatta	United Kingdom	The brig ran aground and was wrecked off "Westergarn", Gotland. She was on a voyage from Belfast, County Antrim to Saint Petersburg, Russia.

== 27 August ==
List of shipwrecks: 27 August 1847
Ship	State	Description
Albion	(United Kingdom of Great Britain and Ireland) British North America	The ship was driven ashore at Port Hood, Nova Scotia. She was on a voyage from Cienfuegos, Cuba to Quebec City, Province of Canada.
Cricket	United Kingdom	The steamboat suffered a boiler explosion and sank in the River Thames near Waterloo Bridge with the loss of five lives.
Cruiser	(United Kingdom of Great Britain and Ireland) Isle of Man	The sloop was driven ashore at Keiss, Caithness. Her crew survived. She was on a voyage from Fraserburgh, Aberdeenshire to Douglas.
Emanuel	Belgium	The ship was driven ashore and damaged in the Scheldt at Antwerp. She was on a voyage from Antwerp to Singapore, Batavia, Netherlands East Indies and Manila, Spanish East Indies She was refloated and put back to Antwerp.
Forsoget	Norway	The ship was driven ashore and wrecked on Hiiumaa, Russia. She was on a voyage from Saint Petersburg, Russia to Bergen.
Xarifa	(United Kingdom of Great Britain and Ireland) Royal Yacht Squadron	The yacht ran aground and was damaged off Sconce Point, Isle of Wight. All on board survived. She was later refloated.

== 28 August ==
List of shipwrecks: 28 August 1847
Ship	State	Description
Adeline	(United Kingdom of Great Britain and Ireland) British North America	The ship was driven ashore on Mud Island, Nova Scotia. She was on a voyage from Saint John, New Brunswick to Cork. She was consequently condemned.
Immanuel Skant	Prussia	The ship capsized and sank at Danzig. She was on a voyage from Königsberg to London, United Kingdom. She was refloated on 6 September.
John	United States	The ship was abandoned in the Gut of Canso. She was on a voyage from Belfast, County Antrim, United Kingdom to New York.
Queen	United Kingdom	The brig was wrecked in the Hooghly River. Her crew were rescued. She was on a voyage from Calcutta, India to Mauritius.
Zenith	United Kingdom	The ship ran aground on the Swinebottoms. She was on a voyage from Saint Petersburg, Russia to London. She was refloated and resumed her voyage.

== 29 August ==
List of shipwrecks: 29 August 1847
Ship	State	Description
Raven	United Kingdom	The schooner ran aground on the Scroby Sands, Norfolk. She was on a voyage from Bangor to Great Yarmouth, Norfolk and Grimsby, Lincolnshire. She was refloated.
HMS Snake	Royal Navy	The Snake-class brig-sloop was wrecked in the Mozambique Channel. Her crew were rescued by Voltigeur (French Navy).

== 30 August ==
List of shipwrecks: 30 August 1847
Ship	State	Description
Robert de Diable	Belgium	The ship foundered in the North Sea. Her crew survived. She was on a voyage from Newcastle upon Tyne, Northumberland, United Kingdom to Africa.
Sultana	United Kingdom	The ship struck a sunken rock in Sandwick Bay. She was on a voyage from Arkhangelsk, Russia to Liverpool, Lancashire. She put in to Stornoway, Isle of Lewis, Outer Hebrides.
True Blue	United Kingdom	The ship ran aground and was damaged on the Horse Bank, in Liverpool Bay. She was on a voyage from Liverpool, Lancashire to Pictou, Nova Scotia, British North America. She was refloated the next day and taken in to Lytham St. Annes, Lancashire.
Zwilling Broderne	Norway	The ship was abandoned in the Atlantic Ocean. Her crew were rescued by Francis Western (United Kingdom). Zwilling Broderne was on a voyage from Lisbon, Portugal to Christiansand.

== 31 August ==
List of shipwrecks: unknown date in August 1847
Ship	State	Description
Active	United Kingdom	The ship foundered in Ramsey Sound with the loss of all hands.

== Unknown date ==
List of shipwrecks: unknown date in August 1847
Ship	State	Description
Antelope	(United Kingdom of Great Britain and Ireland) British North America	The ship was abandoned in the Atlantic Ocean.
Courier de la Seine Inferieure	France	The ship was wrecked in the River Plate at the mouth of the Guazú before 8 August.
General Graham	United Kingdom	The ship sprang a leak and was abandoned in the Atlantic Ocean 40 nautical miles (74 km) west of Ireland. She was on a voyage from Alloa, Clackmannanshire to Quebec City, Province of Canada, British North America. She subsequently foundered.
Hebe	United Kingdom	The ship was wrecked on the Gunfleet Sand, in the North Sea off the coast of Essex.
Isabella	United Kingdom	The barque was driven ashore at Cape Agulhas, Cape Colony before 18 August.
John	United Kingdom	The ship was driven ashore at Maryport, Cumberland. She had been refloated by 23 August and taken in to Maryport.
Levin	(United Kingdom of Great Britain and Ireland) New Zealand	The cutter left Port Levy, New Zealand early in August and was never seen again. She is thought to have foundered. There were 19 people on board.
HMS Mastiff	Royal Navy	The Bold-class gun-brig was driven ashore on Sanday, Orkney Islands. Her crew were rescued. She had been refloated by 30 August and taken in to Stromness, Orkney Islands.
Mary Ann	United Kingdom	The ship ran aground on the Mouse Sand, in the North Sea off the coast of Essex. She was refloated and put in to the River Thames.
Nautilus	United Kingdom	The screw steamer was severely damaged by fire in the Mediterranean Sea. She was on a voyage from Alexandria, Egypt to Liverpool, Lancashire. She put back to Alexandria, where she arrived on 25 August.
Neva	United Kingdom	The ship was driven ashore on the Swedish coast before 16 August. She was on a voyage from Hull, Yorkshire to Saint Petersburg, Russia. She was refloated and resumed her voyage.
Oceana	United States	The ship was abandoned in the Atlantic Ocean. She was subsequently discovered by a British vessel which put a skeleton crew on board with the intention of taking her in to Halifax, Nova Scotia, British North America.
Rio de Pique	Spain	The ship was driven ashore near Camariñas. She was on a voyage from Adra to Dunkirk, Nord, France.
Themis	United Kingdom	The ship foundered in the Atlantic Ocean 70 nautical miles (130 km) off Viana do Castelo, Portugal. Her crew were rescued by the paddle steamer Pacha (United Kingdom). Themis was on a voyage from Alicante, Spain to South Shields, County Durham.
Victoire	France	The ship was driven ashore at "Hildervig". She was refloated.
