= Ribersborgsstranden =

- Neighbourhood
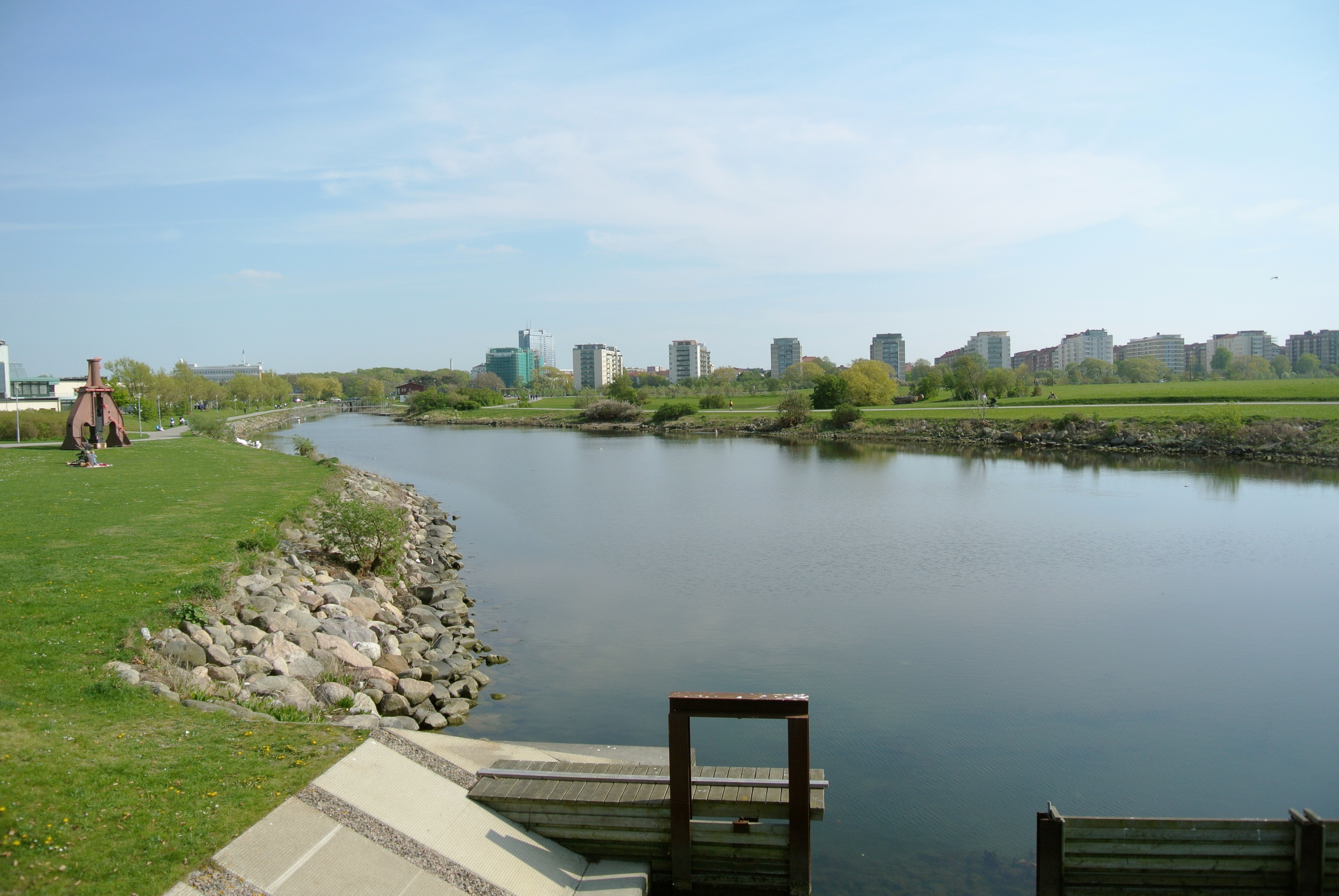
- Ribersborgsstranden begins west of Turbinkanalen, here on the right side and in the background
- Interactive map of Ribersborgsstranden
- Coordinates: 55°36′03″N 12°57′31″E
- Country: Sweden
- Province: Skåne
- County: Skåne County
- Municipality: Malmö Municipality
- District of Malmö: Innerstaden

Population (1 January 2011)
  - Total: 0
- Time zone: UTC+1 (CET)
  - Summer (DST): UTC+2 (CEST)

Ribersborgsstranden is a neighbourhood of Malmö, situated in the district of Innerstaden, Malmö Municipality, Skåne County, Sweden. It contains the Ribersborgs open-air bath, which opened in 1898 but was destroyed in the Christmas Hurricane of 1902 and had to be rebuilt.
