= Solbacken, Malmö =

Solbacken
- Neighbourhood
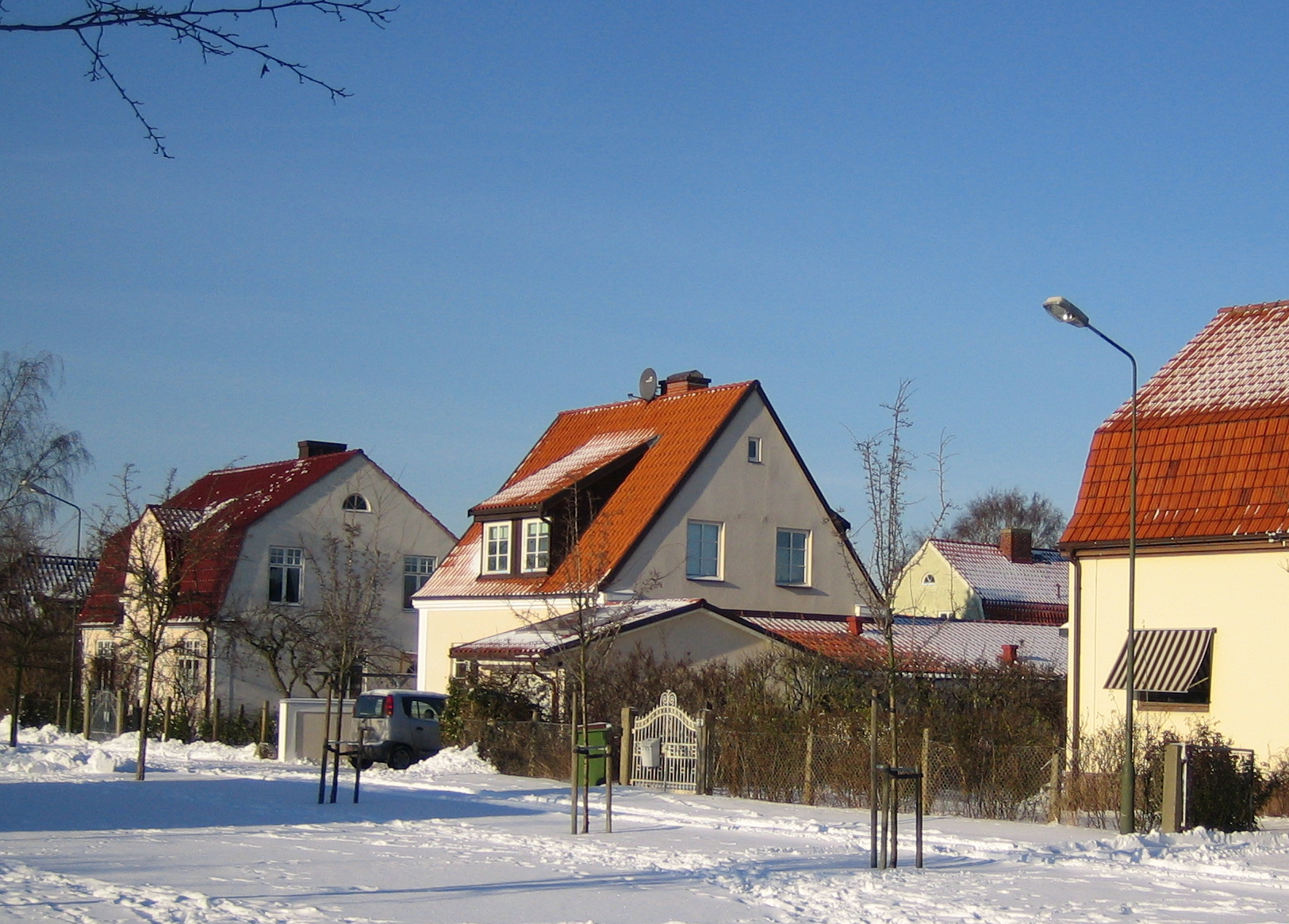
- Interactive map of Solbacken
- Coordinates: 55°35′16″N 12°58′33″E
- Country: Sweden
- Province: Skåne
- County: Skåne County
- Municipality: Malmö Municipality
- Borough of Malmö: Västra Innerstaden

Population (1 January 2011)
  - Total: 1,221
- Time zone: UTC+1 (CET)
  - Summer (DST): UTC+2 (CEST)

Solbacken (Sunnynook) is a neighbourhood of Malmö, situated in the Borough of Västra Innerstaden, Malmö Municipality, Skåne County, Sweden.
