= Fågelbacken =

Neighbourhood of Malmö, Sweden

- Neighbourhood
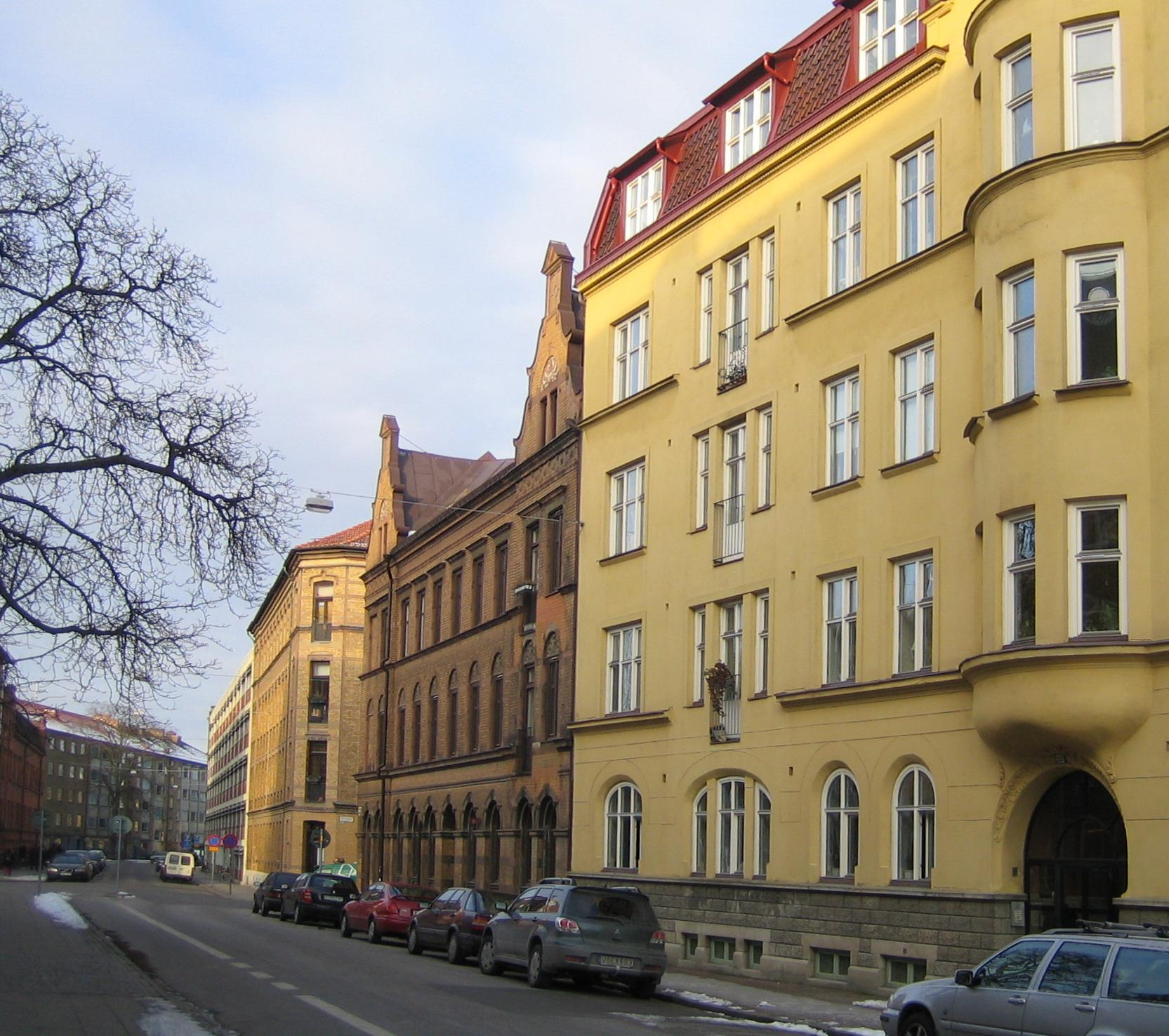
- Interactive map of Fågelbacken
- Coordinates: 55°35′53″N 12°57′58″E
- Country: Sweden
- Province: Skåne
- County: Skåne County
- Municipality: Malmö Municipality
- Borough of Malmö: Västra Innerstaden

Population (1 January 2011)
  - Total: 2,608
- Time zone: UTC+1 (CET)
  - Summer (DST): UTC+2 (CEST)

Fågelbacken is a neighbourhood of Malmö, situated in the Borough of Västra Innerstaden, Malmö Municipality, Skåne County, Sweden.
