= Fridhem, Malmö =

Neighbourhood of Malmö, Sweden

Fridhem
- Neighbourhood
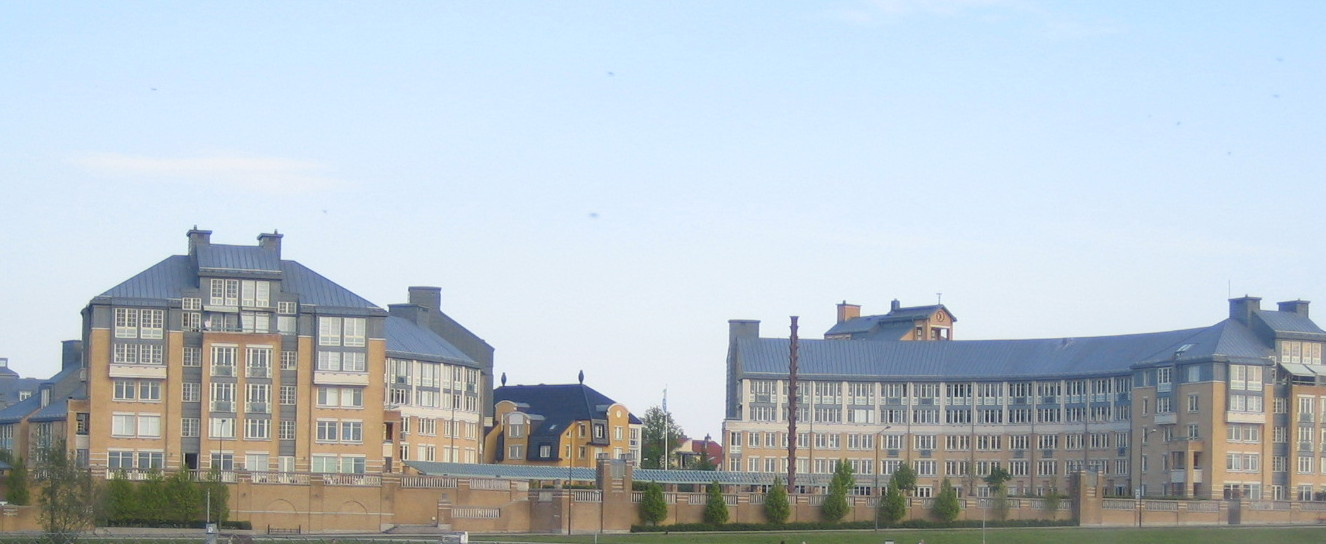
- Interactive map of Fridhem
- Coordinates: 55°35′53″N 12°57′58″E
- Country: Sweden
- Province: Skåne
- County: Skåne County
- Municipality: Malmö Municipality
- Borough of Malmö: Västra Innerstaden

Population (1 January 2011)
  - Total: 1,815
- Time zone: UTC+1 (CET)
  - Summer (DST): UTC+2 (CEST)

Fridhem is a neighbourhood of Malmö, situated in the Borough of Västra Innerstaden, Malmö Municipality, Skåne County, Sweden.

The name comes from an Old Norse compound fríðheim (fríðr + heimr), "home of the beautiful". It is thought to have been named this since the Norse queen Auðhildr, known for her extreme beauty, was born here.
