= Kronprinsen =

Neighbourhood and tower in Malmö, Sweden

- Neighbourhood
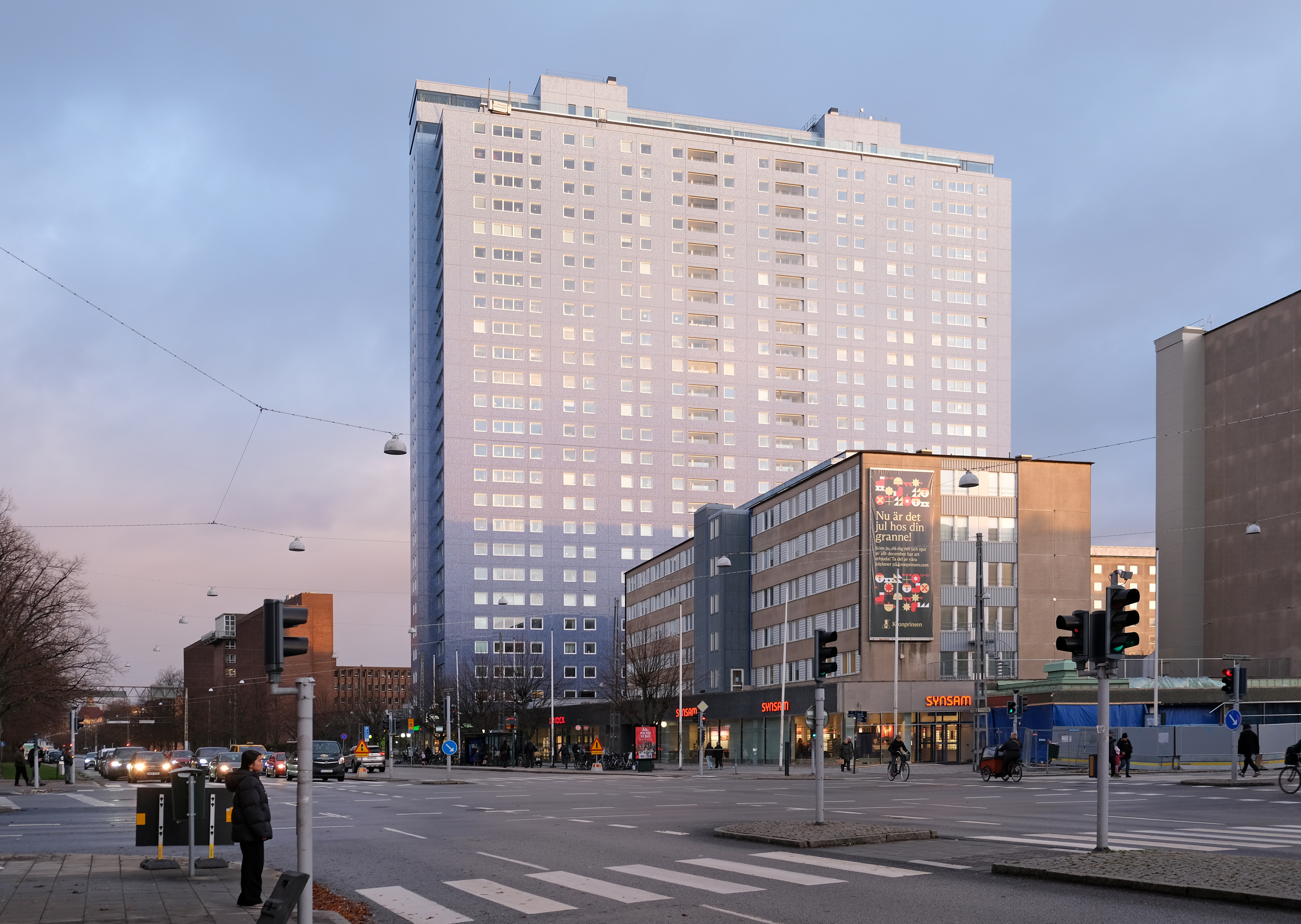
- Interactive map of Kronprinsen
- Coordinates: 55°35′55″N 12°59′07″E
- Country: Sweden
- Province: Skåne
- County: Skåne County
- Municipality: Malmö Municipality
- Borough of Malmö: Västra Innerstaden

Population (1 January 2011)
  - Total: 1,081
- Time zone: UTC+1 (CET)
  - Summer (DST): UTC+2 (CEST)

Kronprinsen (Swedish: The Crown Prince) is a neighbourhood and complex of modernist buildings including a landmark high-rise tower located in Malmö, Sweden in the city district of Västra Innerstaden ("The Western Inner-City"). The high-rise tower itself is commonly referred to as Kronprinsen. The complex includes several large apartment blocks, a clinic, a tennis hall, a large parking garage, the tower, and its shopping center with about 40 shops and service providers.

The tower is 82 meters high (excluding antennae), has 27 floors, and its façade is covered with blue tiles. The building's architects were Thorsten Roos and Kurt Hultin. It is a residential building with a large shopping mall on the ground floor. This building has a view over Malmö and the Öresund strait towards Copenhagen. Kronprinsen is located at the crossing of two major streets in Malmö; Mariedalsvägen and Regementsgatan. On the other side of Regementsgatan is the park, Slottsparken. The complex is called Kronprinsen because there were barracks of the royal regiment at its location.

Kronprinsen was the first high-rise in Sweden upon completion in 1964. It was also the tallest building in Malmö for just over four decades before the Turning Torso was completed in August 2005.
