= HSB (Sweden) =

Cooperative association for housing in Sweden

Logo of HSB

HSB (Swedish: Hyresgästernas sparkasse - och byggnadsförening; "the Savings and Construction Association of the Tenants") is a cooperative association for housing in Sweden. They are the largest housing cooperative in Sweden. HSB reports that approximately 10% of all Swedes live in HSB properties.

Members of the association are HSB's customers, i.e. individuals or groups that have bought properties from HSB. Any entity that buys any property from HSB will automatically become a member.

Many HSB buildings are architecturally significant. HSB built the Turning Torso, Scandinavia's tallest building from 2005 to 2022, and they manage the 148 apartments in the building. The HSB building Studio 1 won the Kasper Salin Prize in 2016 from Architects Sweden, as the Swedish building of the year.
