= Rönneholm, Malmö =

Rönneholm
- Neighbourhood
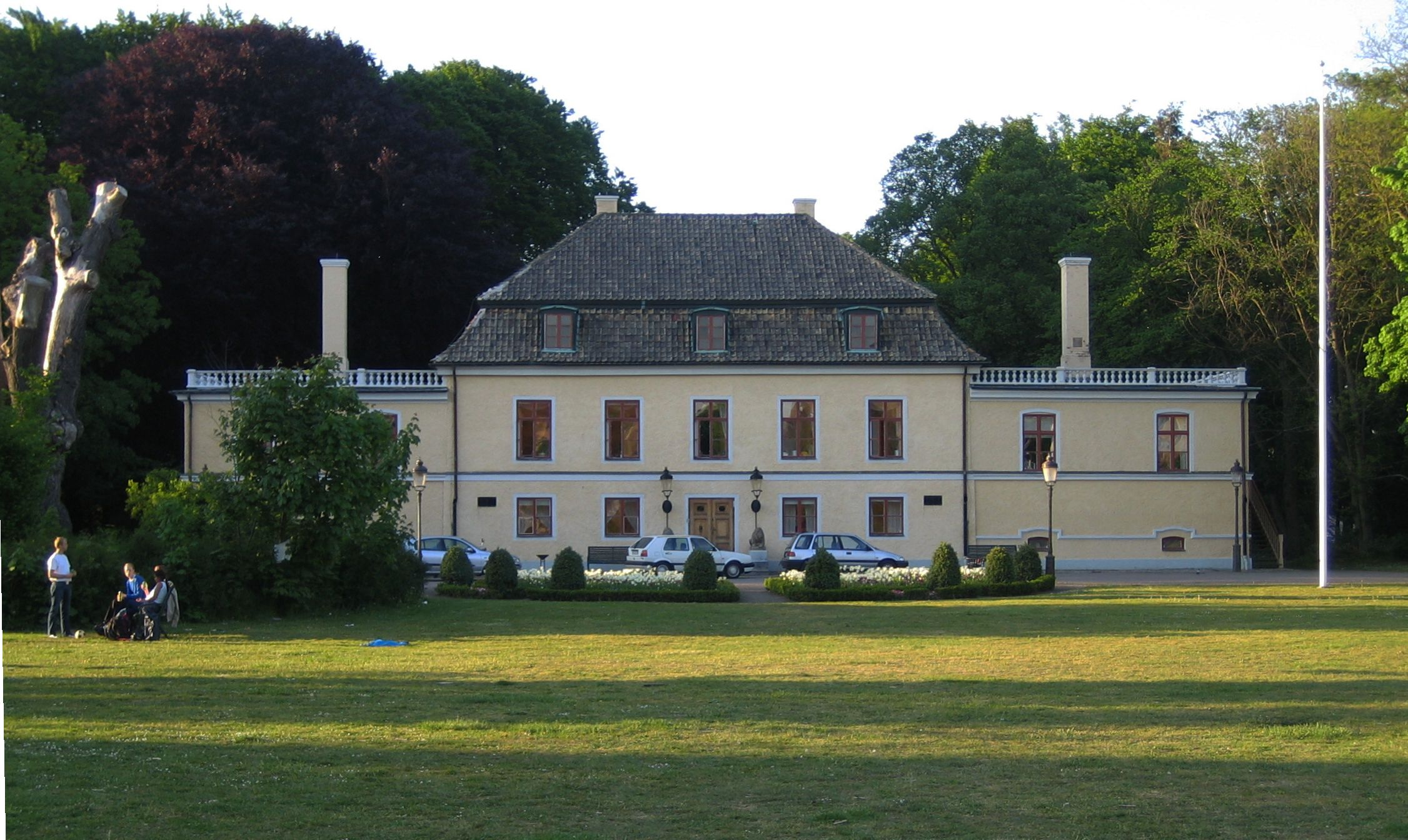
- Interactive map of Rönneholm
- Coordinates: 55°35′44″N 12°58′33″E
- Country: Sweden
- Province: Skåne
- County: Skåne County
- Municipality: Malmö Municipality
- Borough of Malmö: Västra Innerstaden

Population (1 January 2011)
  - Total: 7,264
- Time zone: UTC+1 (CET)
  - Summer (DST): UTC+2 (CEST)

Rönneholm is a neighbourhood of Malmö, situated in the Borough of Västra Innerstaden, Malmö Municipality, Skåne County, Sweden.
