= Turning Torso =

Residential skyscraper in Malmö, Sweden

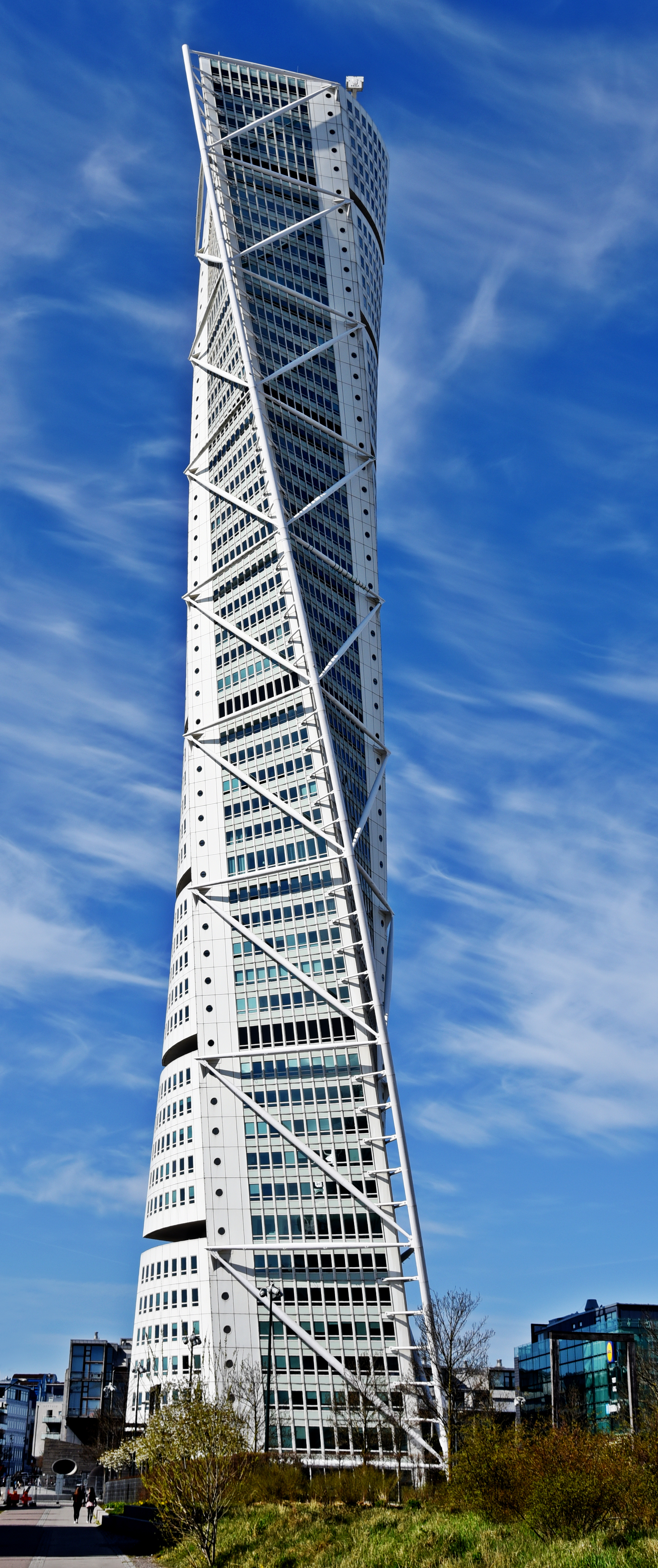
- Turning Torso, the second-tallest building in the Nordic region.
- Interactive map of the Turning Torso area

General information
- Status: Completed
- Type: Commercial office Rental apartments
- Architectural style: Neo-futurism
- Location: Lilla Varvsgatan 14, 211 15; Malmö, Sweden
- Construction started: 14 February 2001; 25 years ago
- Completed: 27 August 2005; 21 years ago
- Opened: 1 November 2005; 20 years ago
- Inaugurated: 27 August 2005; 21 years ago

Height
- Roof: 190 m (623 ft)
- Top floor: 178.79 m (586.58 ft)

Technical details
- Floor count: 54
- Floor area: 27,500 m^{2} (296,008 sq ft)
- Lifts/elevators: 5

Design and construction
- Architect: Santiago Calatrava
- Main contractor: NCC

Website
- www.turningtorso.se

Turning Torso is a neo-futurist residential skyscraper built in Malmö, Sweden, in 2005. It was the tallest building in the Nordic region until September 2022, when it was surpassed by Karlatornet in Gothenburg. Located on the Swedish side of the Öresund strait, it was built and is owned by Swedish cooperative housing association HSB. It is regarded as the second twisted skyscraper in the world to receive the title after Telekom Tower in Malaysia.

It was designed by Spanish architect, structural engineer, sculptor and painter Santiago Calatrava and officially opened on 27 August 2005. It reaches a height of 190 m (620 ft) with 54 stories and 147 apartments. Turning Torso won the 2005 Gold Emporis Skyscraper Award; and in 2015, the 10 Year Award from the Council on Tall Buildings and Urban Habitat.

== Design ==
Turning Torso is based on Twisting Torso, a white marble sculpture by Calatrava that was based on the form of a twisting human being.

In 1999, HSB Malmö's former managing director, Johnny Örbäck, saw the sculpture in a brochure presenting Calatrava in connection with his contribution to the architectural competition for the Öresund Bridge. It was on this occasion that Örbäck was inspired to build HSB Turning Torso. Shortly afterwards he travelled to Zurich to meet Calatrava, and ask him to design a residential building based on the idea of a structure of twisting cubes.

Illustration of the general structure of the Turning Torso. (Note: (1) shows a typical floor plan, where the grey circle denotes the core and blue shapes denote the steel framework. (2) shows the way the nine segments fit around the core, and (3) is a dimetric projection of the tower.)

It is a solid, immobile building constructed in nine segments of five-story pentagons that twist relative to each other as it rises; the topmost segment is twisted 90 degrees clockwise from the ground floor. Each floor consists of an irregular pentagonal shape rotating around the vertical core, which is supported by an exterior steel framework. The two bottom segments are intended as office space. Segments three to nine house 147 rental apartments.

== Construction ==
Construction started in February 2001. One reason for building Turning Torso was to re-establish a recognisable skyline for Malmö since the removal in 2002 of the Kockums Crane, which was located less than one kilometre (0.6 mi) from Turning Torso. The local politicians deemed it important for the inhabitants to have a new symbol for Malmö in lieu of the crane that had been used for shipbuilding and somewhat symbolised the city's blue collar roots.

The construction of part of this building was featured on Discovery Channel Extreme Engineering TV programme which showed how a floor of the building was constructed.

Prior to the construction of Turning Torso, the 86-metre (282 ft) Kronprinsen had been the city's tallest building.

The apartments were initially supposed to be sold, but insufficient interest resulted in the apartments being let. The owner has several times unsuccessfully tried to sell the building. Construction costs for the building were over twice the initial budgeted costs.

== Events ==
On 18 August 2006, Austrian skydiver Felix Baumgartner parachuted onto the Turning Torso, and then jumped off it.

Floor 49 is home to the public observation deck while floors 50–52 contain a private club, meeting events, the reception, and the venue restaurant.

Floor 53 and 54 in the Turning Torso are conference floors booked and managed by Sky High Meetings. Since 2009 the owner, HSB, has decided to let the public visit these floors but only on special scheduled days, and pre-booking is required.

== Gallery ==
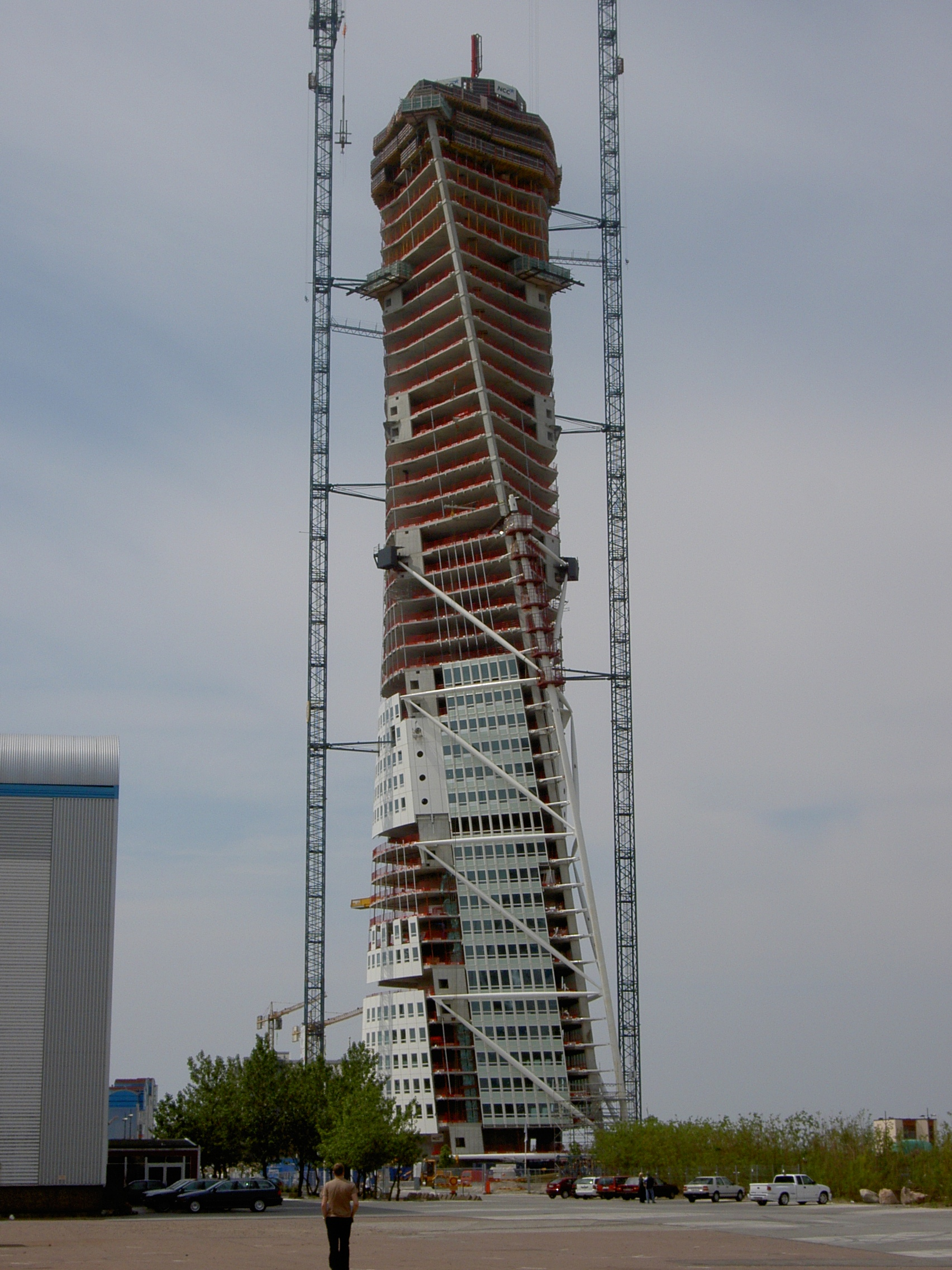
Construction in 2004

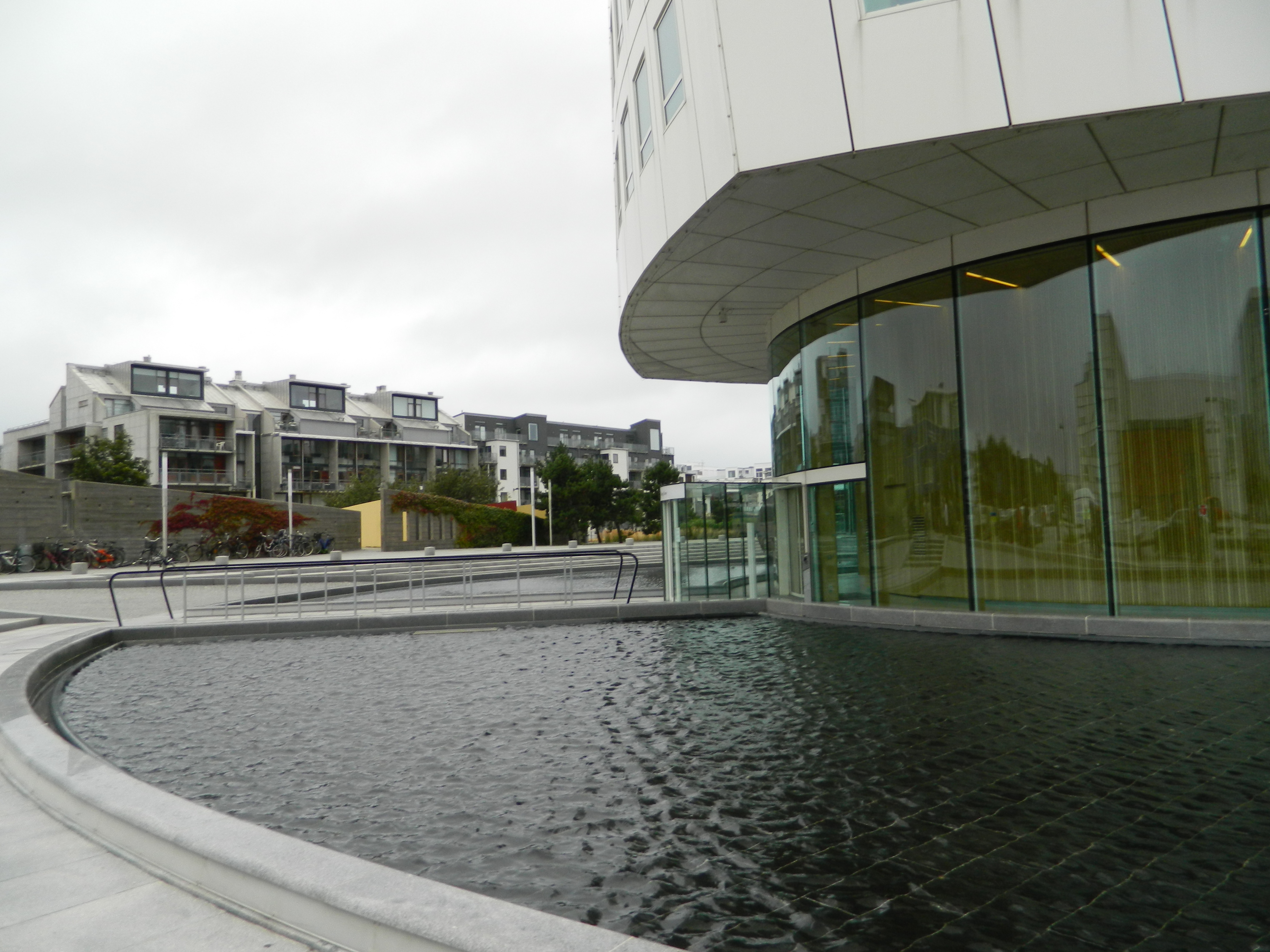
Main entrance

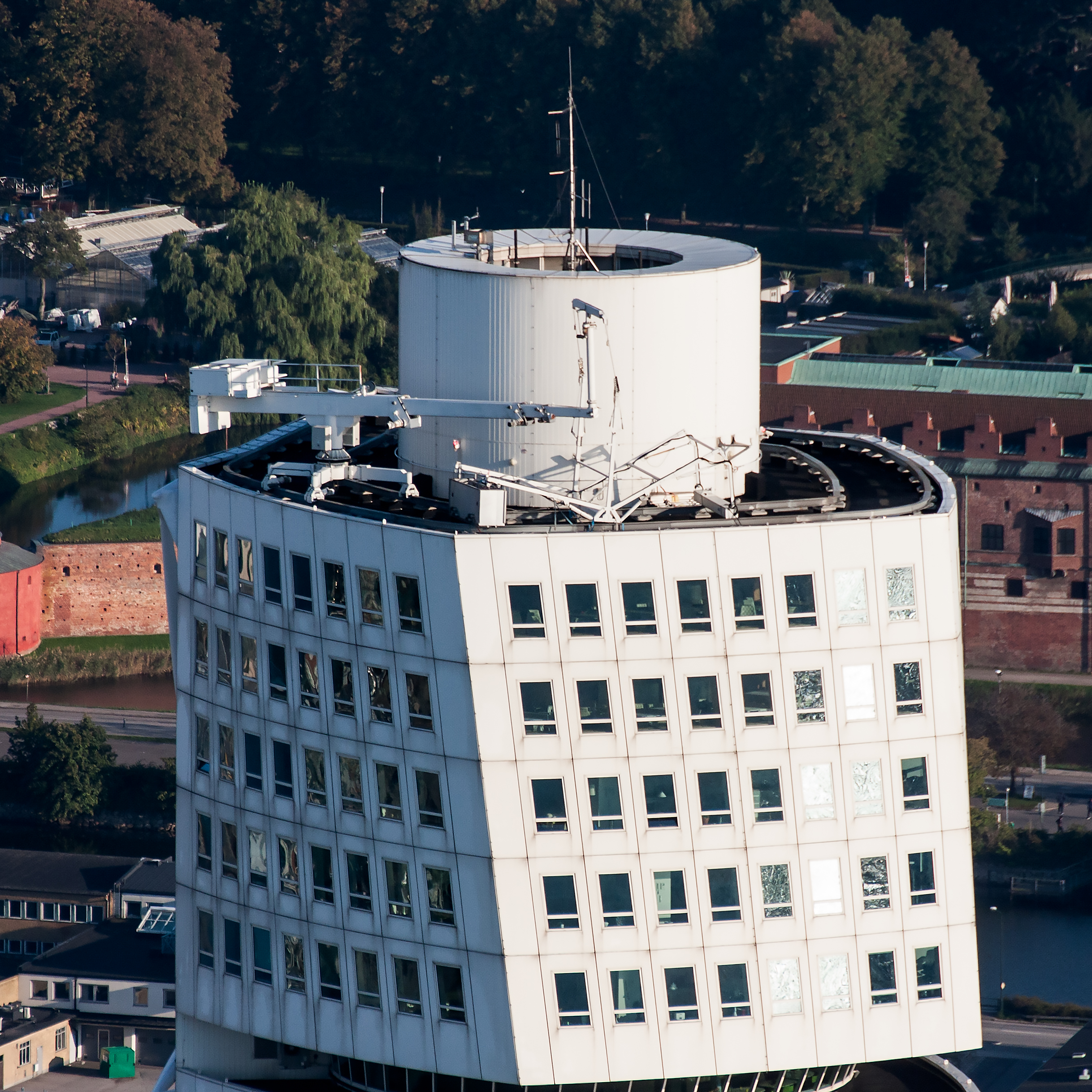
Top floors

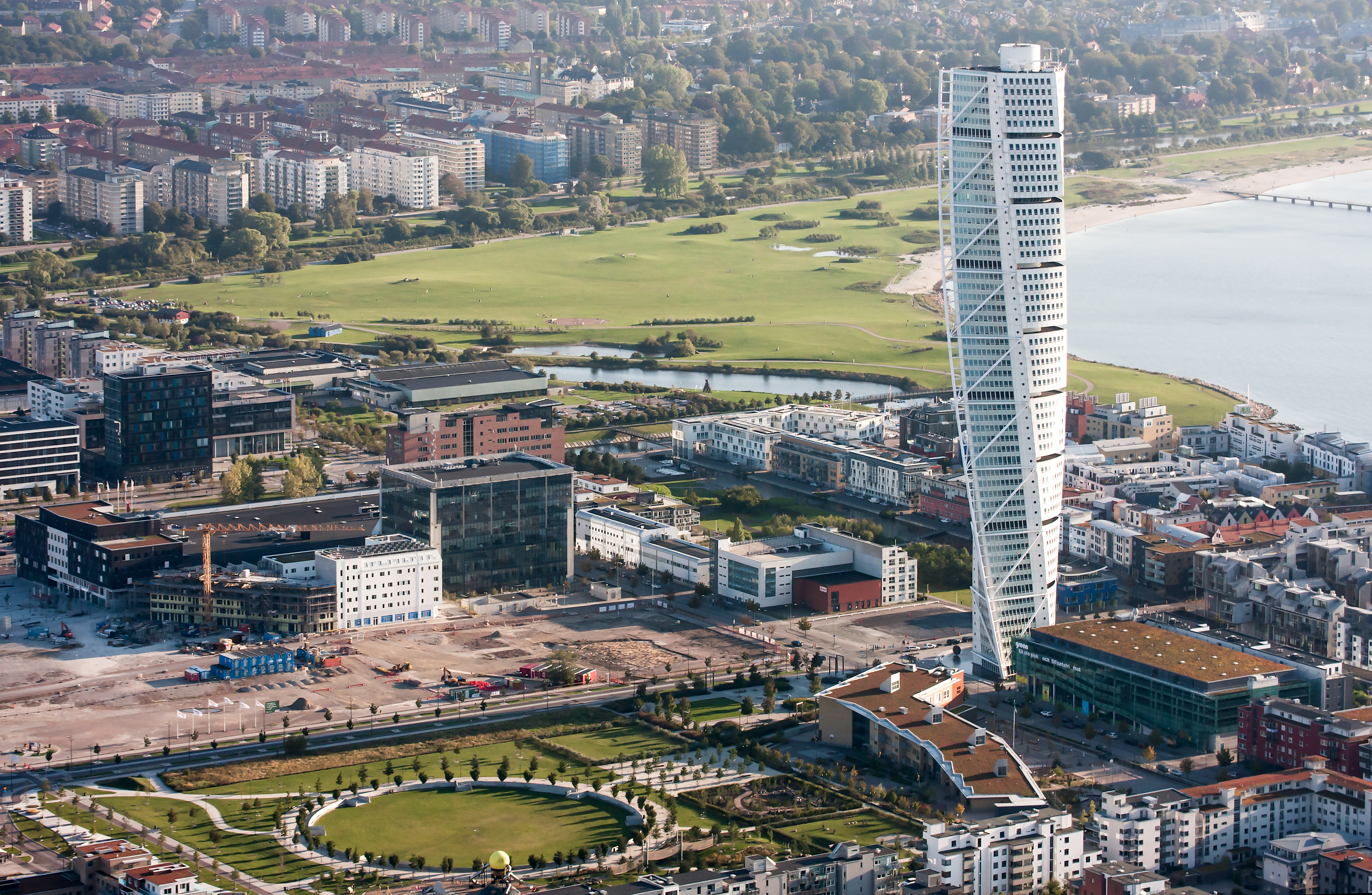
Aerial view

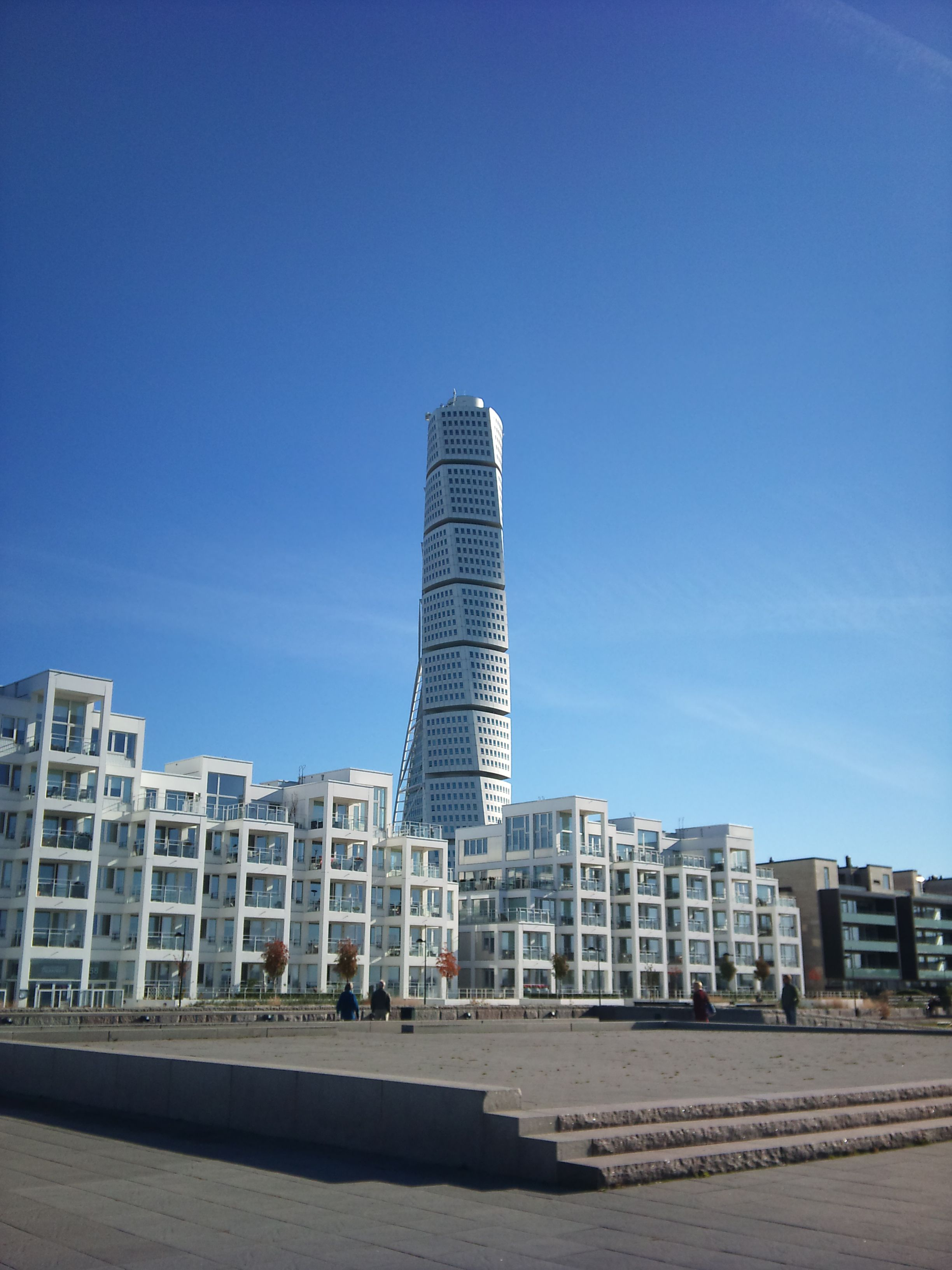
View from the ground level

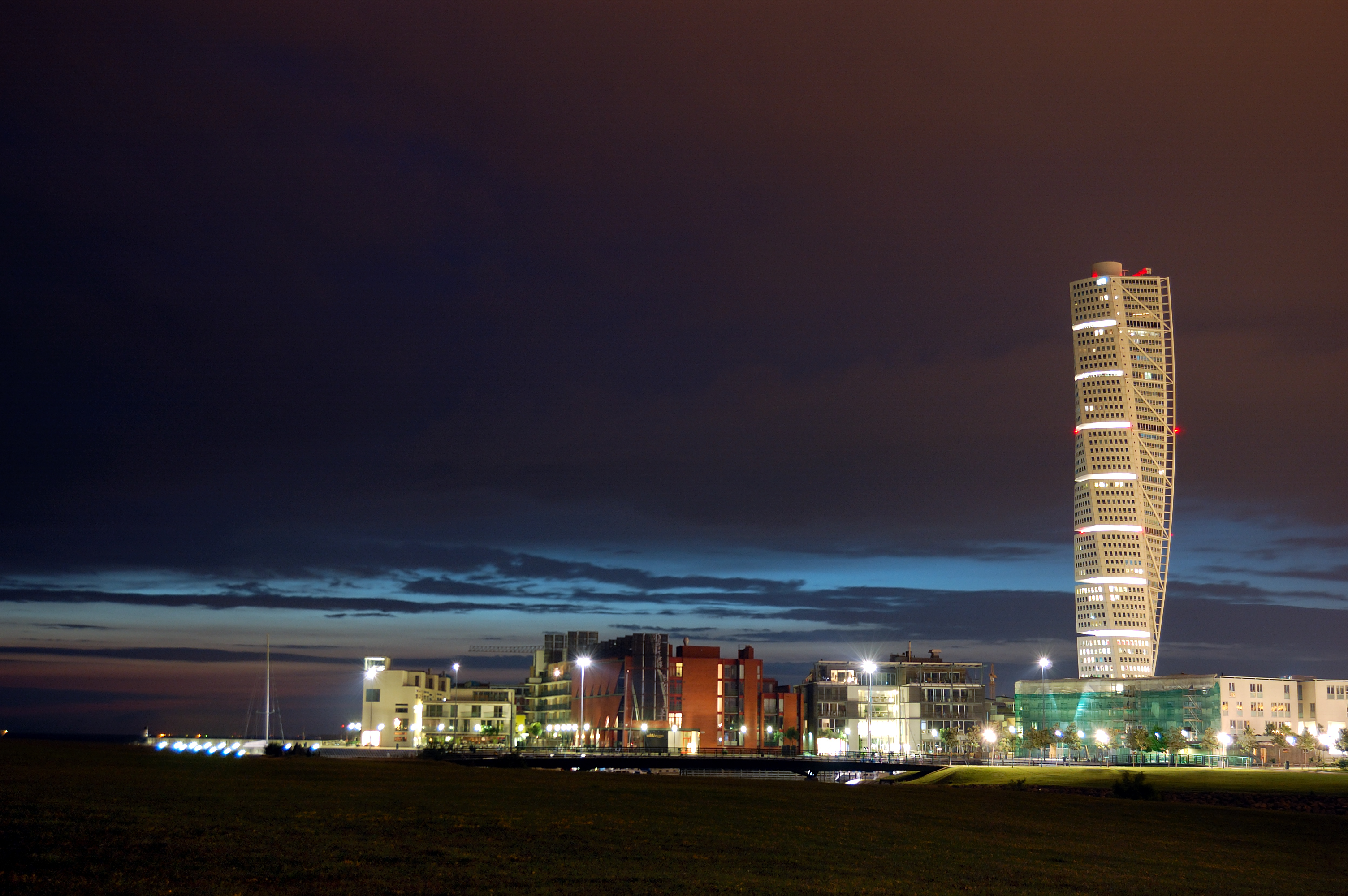
View at night

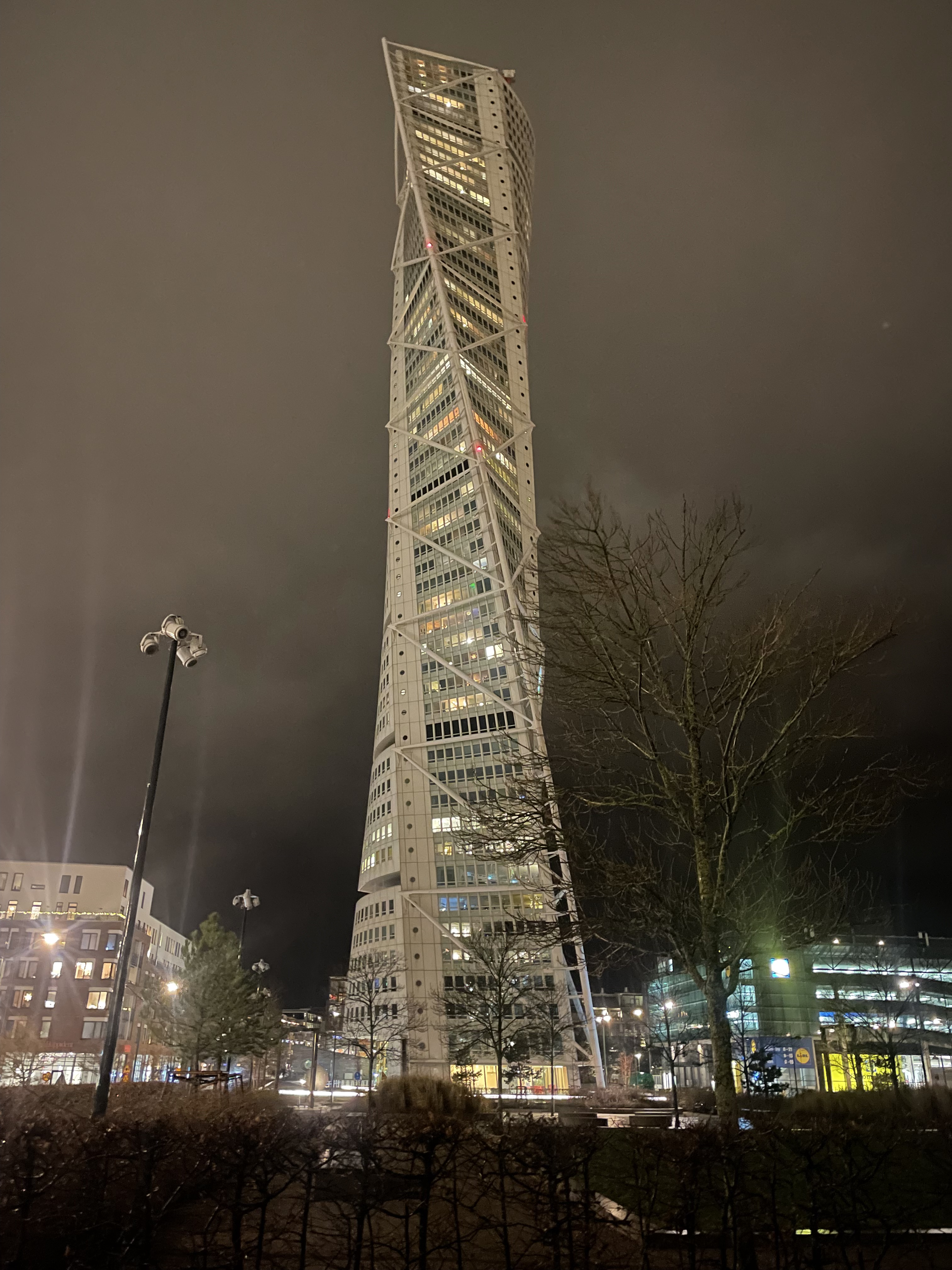
Seen in wintry evening light, January 2024

== See also ==
- List of tallest buildings in Europe
- List of tallest buildings in Sweden
- List of twisted buildings
- Shanghai Tower, Tallest twisted building
- Azrieli Sarona Tower
- Karla Tower
- List of tallest buildings in Scandinavia
