= Ribersborgs open-air bath =

Public bath in Malmö, Sweden

Coordinates: 55°36′18″N 12°57′56″E

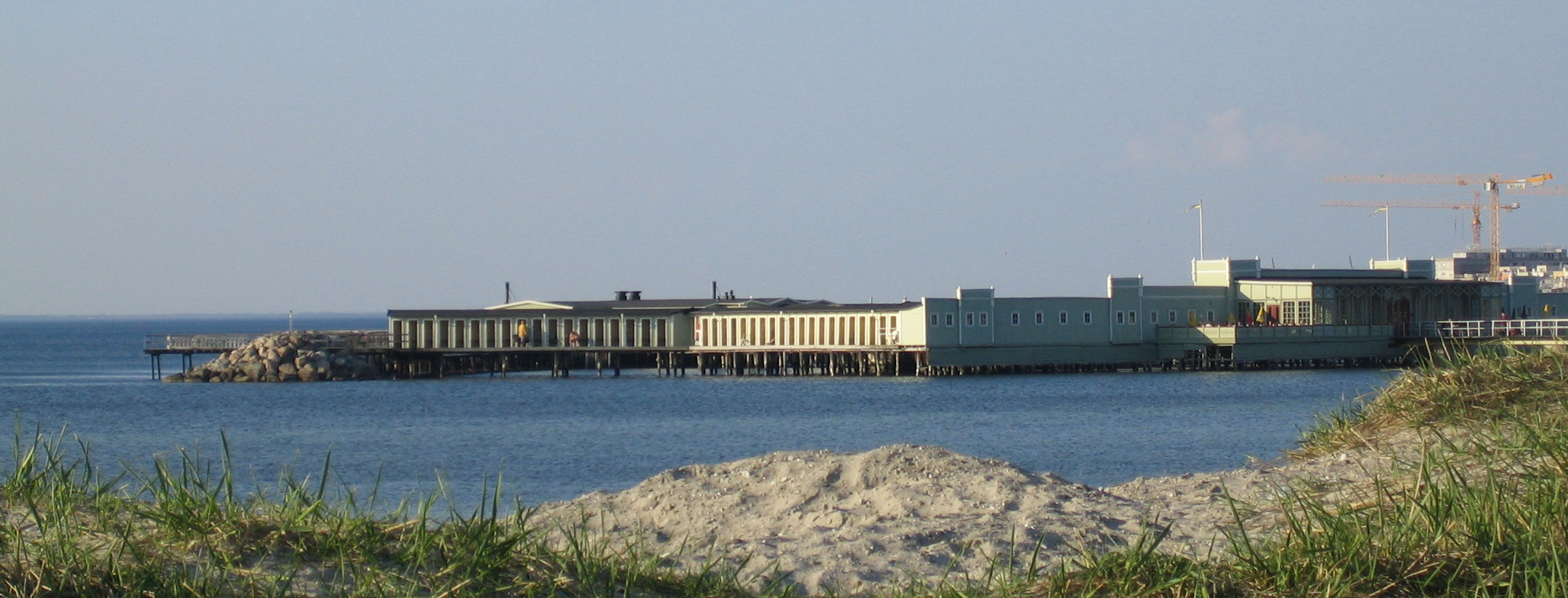

Ribersborg open-air bathhouse (Ribersborgs kallbadhus in Swedish, also known as Ribban by the older and Kallis by the younger generation) is an open-air public bath at a historic wooden pier on Ribersborg beach in Malmö, Sweden, approximately one kilometre southwest of Turning Torso. The bathhouse is open for a skinny dip year round and has separate areas for men and women. Each area is equipped with two saunas and a warm water tub. There is also one mixed sauna between the ladies and gentlemen's area. It also contains a café and a restaurant.

The bathhouse was inaugurated in June 1898 as an initiative by C. A. Richter, who bought the old bathhouse at Nyhamn port, which was being sold because of the port's expansion. Four years later a storm damaged the new bath during Christmas and it was rebuilt. During the refurbishment a diving tower was added to the men's section, with a view of the strait and the women's section. During the 1930s, it was modernised with nude bathing and partitions were added between the sections. In 1966, the City of Malmö purchased the baths. It was again damaged by a storm in 1988 and in 1995 it was declared a historic building.
