= Limhamn-Bunkeflo =

Limhamn
- Former city district
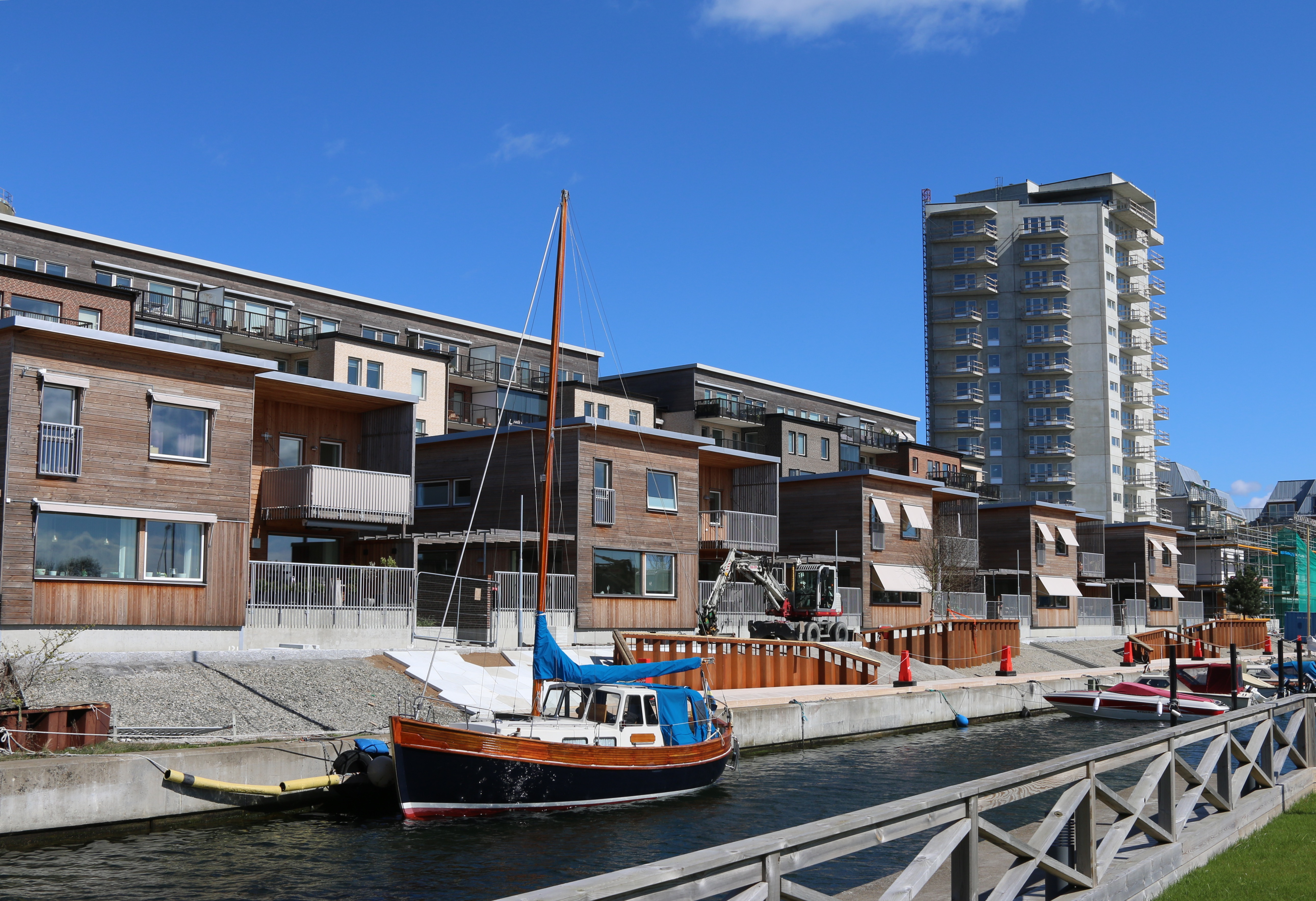
- Dragörkajen, Limhamn.

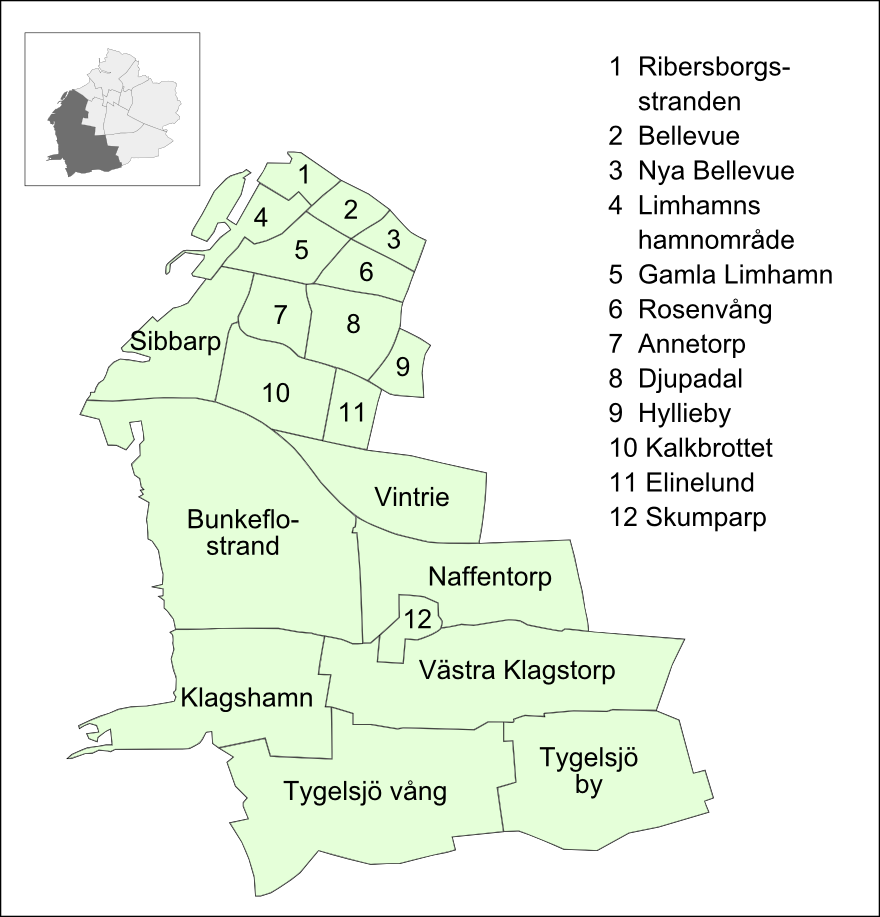
- Limhamn's neighbourhoods
- Country: Sweden
- Province: Scania
- County: Skåne County
- Municipality: Malmö Municipality

Area
  - Total: 5,147 ha (12,720 acres)

Population (2012)
  - Total: 42,646
  - Density: 828.6/km^{2} (2,146/sq mi)
- Time zone: UTC+01:00 (CET)
  - Summer (DST): UTC+02:00 (CEST)

Limhamn-Bunkeflo was a city district (Swedish: stadsdel) in the west and south of Malmö Municipality, Sweden. On 1 July 2013, it was merged with Hyllie, forming Väster. In 2012, Limhamn-Bunkeflo had a population of 42,646 of the municipality's 307,758. The area was 5,147 hectares.

== Neighbourhoods ==
The neighbourhoods of Limhamn-Bunkeflo were:

- Annetorp
- Bellevue
- Bunkeflostrand
- Djupadal
- Elinelund
- Gamla Limhamn
- Hyllieby
- Kalkbrottet
- Klagshamn
- Limhamns hamnområde
- Naffentorp
- Nya Bellevue
- Rosenvång
- Sibbarp
- Skumparp
- Tygelsjö by
- Tygelsjö vång
- Vintrie
- Västra Klagstorp
