= Limhamn =

Neighbourhood in Malmö, Sweden

Coordinates: 55°34′45″N 12°55′15″E

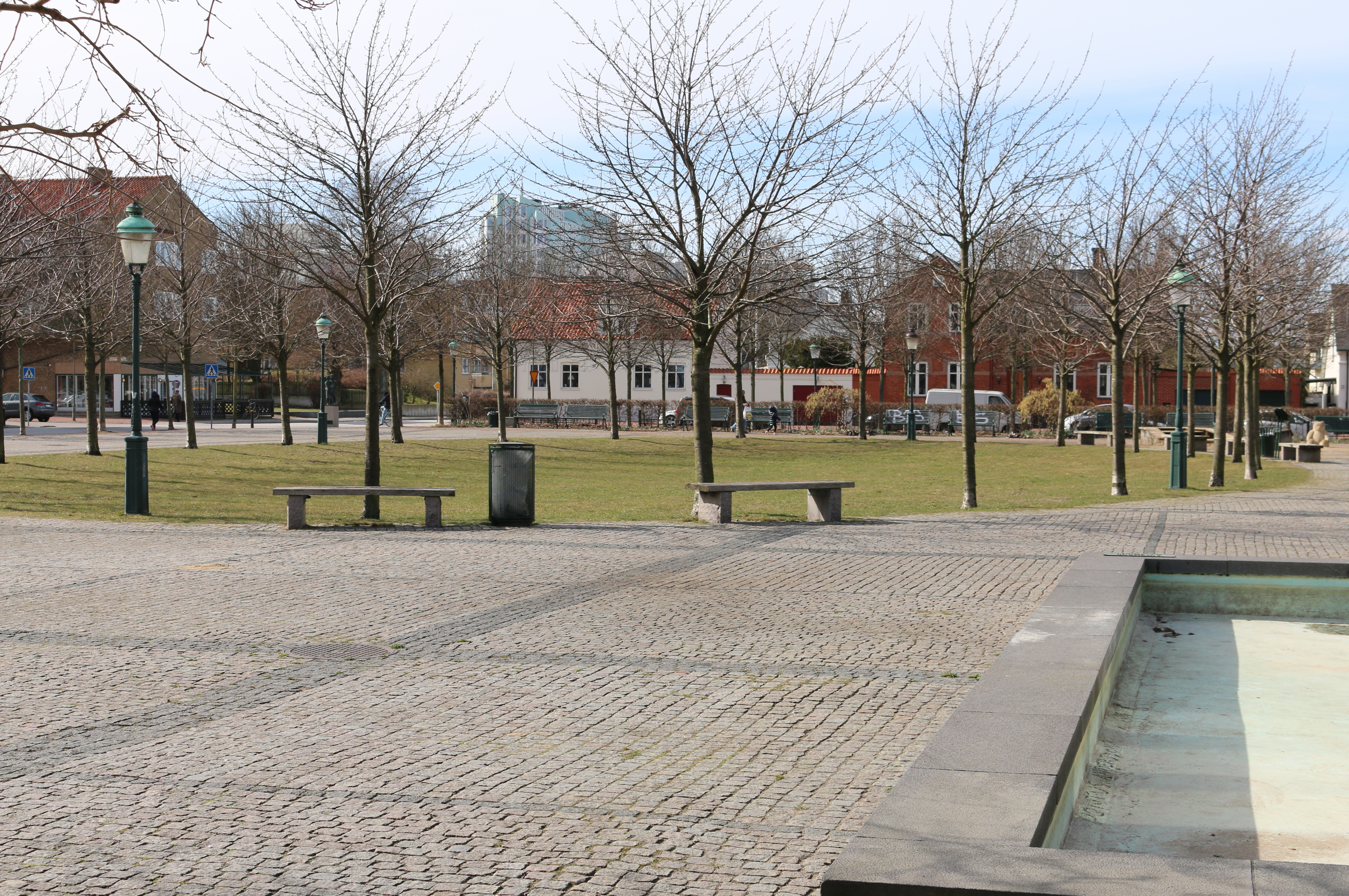
Limhamn

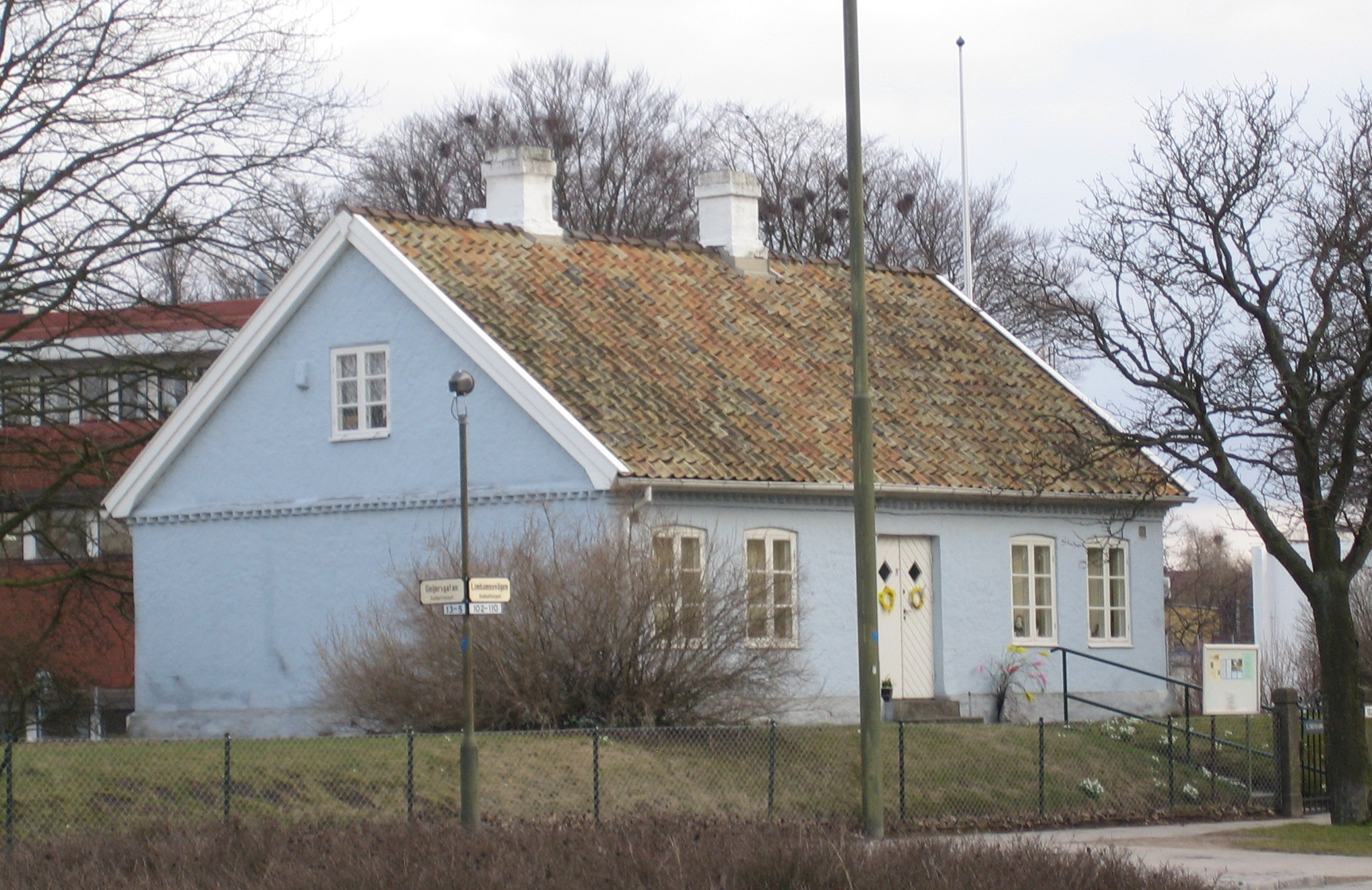
Limhamn's Museum

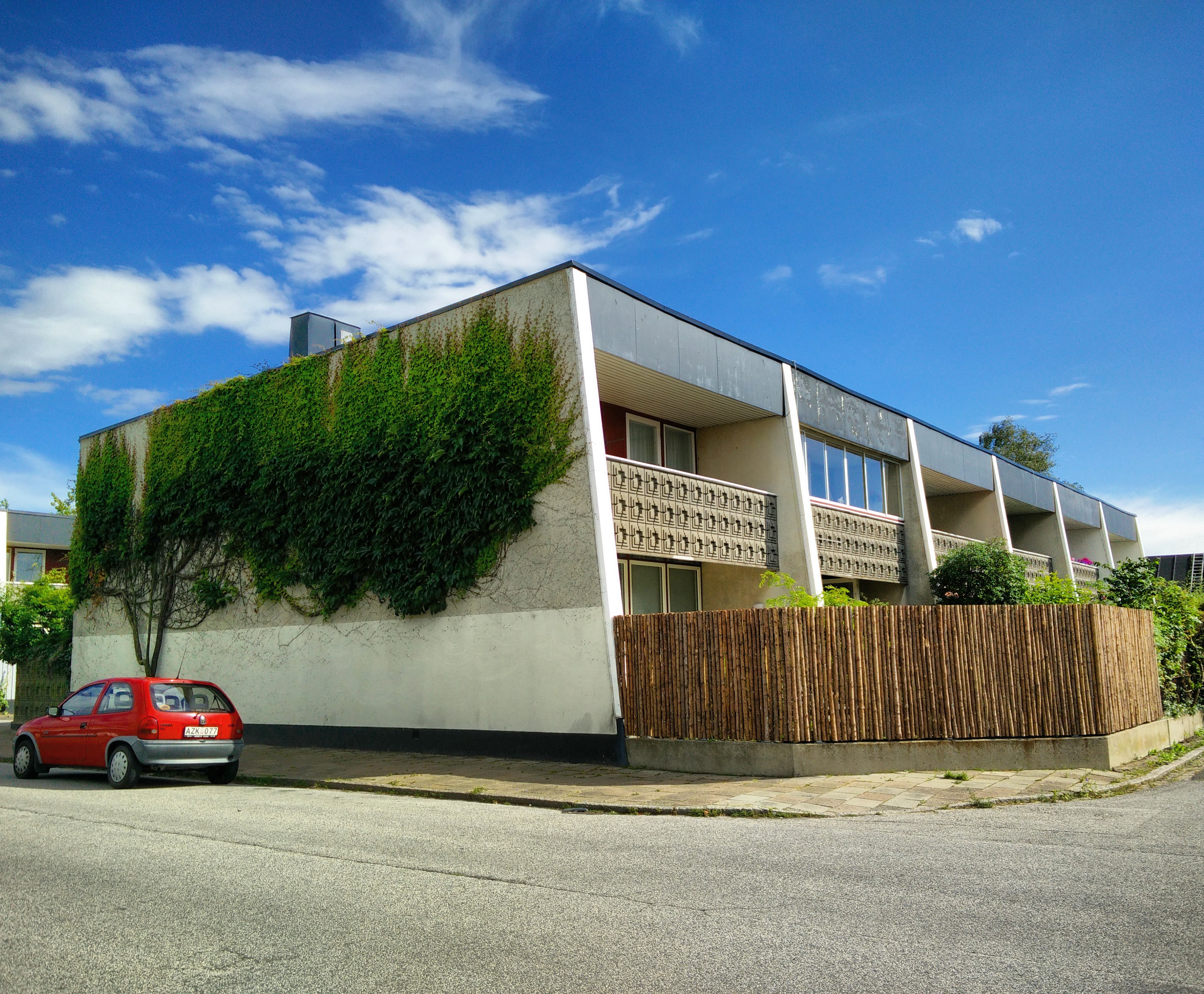
Kuttergränd in Limhamn.

Limhamn (Swedish pronunciation: [ˈlɪ̂mːhamn]) is, in an administrative sense, the southern district of Malmö Municipality in Sweden. Before 1915, Limhamn was (briefly) a town of its own.

The population of Limhamn-Bunkeflo (including suburbs) is 31,000, of which 7,000 live in the southern suburbs Tygelsjö and Bunkeflostrand, and some live in neighbourhoods that are not usually counted to Limhamn proper.

== History ==
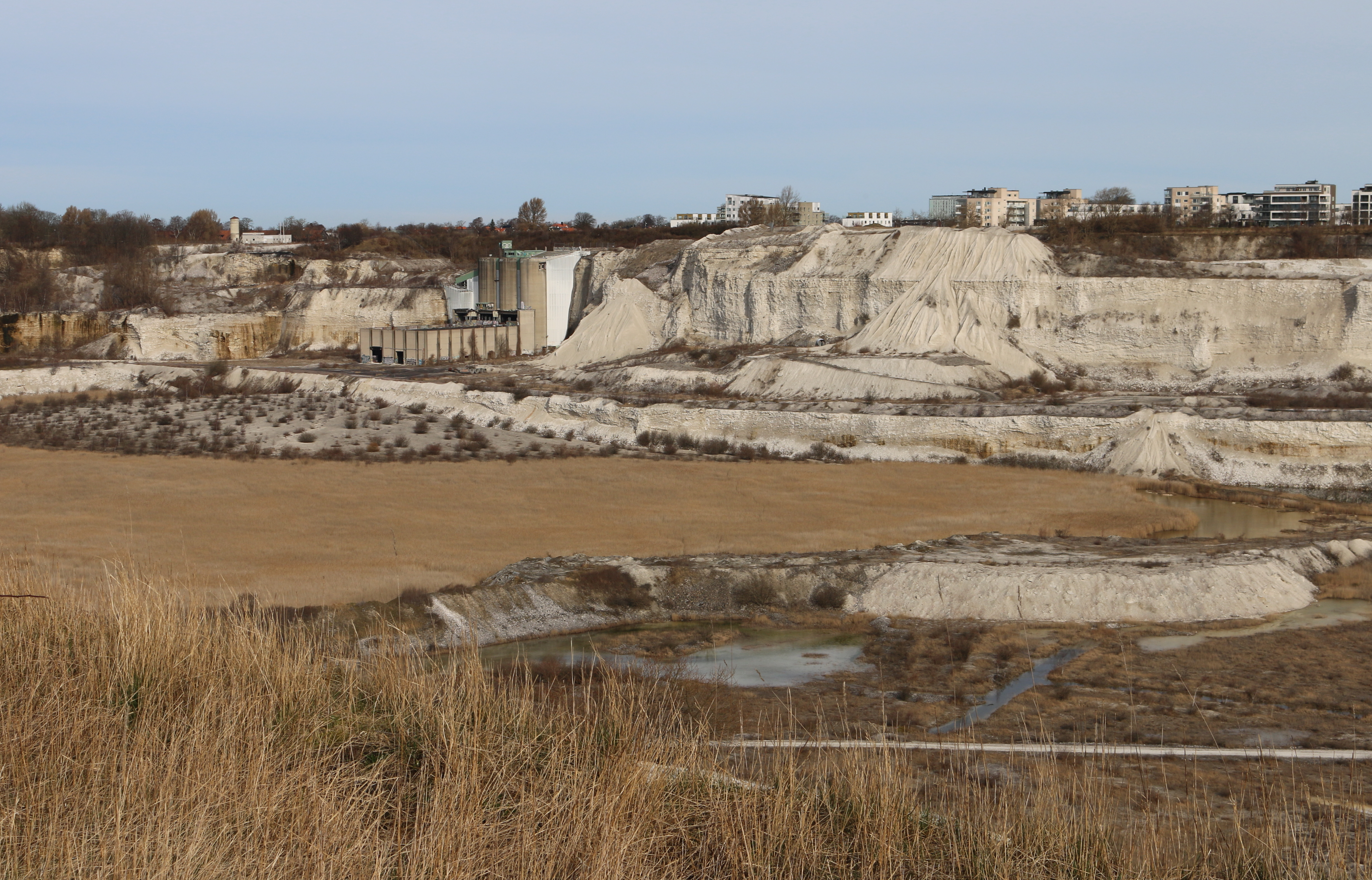
Limhamn limestone quarry

Archeological findings revealed a Stone Age village from the Ertebølle culture at Limhamn. The interpretation of Limhamn's fate in later times diverge. Limhamn is by some held to have been one of the more important fishing villages in Scania, with a population living of the sea and relatively stable in size through the centuries, but this opinion is not undisputed.

Limestone has been quarried in Limhamns kalkbrott since the early 16th century or earlier, which can be inferred from the fact that king Christian II of Denmark (1513–1523) forbade the trade on the illegal harbour Limhamn. But only since 1871 has the quarry been of industrial extent. A large cement factory, railway connection to Malmö, and a freight harbour were constructed in 1889. Soon also other industries were established.

Limhamn grew rapidly in the last decades of the 19th century: to 2,500 inhabitants in 1886, to 8,000 in 1905, when Limhamn was declared a town, and to 10,000 in 1915 when Limhamn was incorporated with the larger town of Malmö (democratically but narrowly decided by the town council). The next increase of the population started with the industrial boom after World War II, when a few blocks of flats were built. From the late 1950s a belt of new detached houses led to Limhamn physically growing together with Malmö. Locals dispute which of these new neighbourhoods really are parts of Limhamn proper, and which are to be rightfully counted with Malmö, which is why figures for Limhamn's present-day population vary approximately in the range 20,000–24,000. Industry has mostly closed down in the late 20th century, and most people now work elsewhere in the metropolitan area that covers most of Western Scania.

== Demographics ==
Today, all of Limhamn is a modestly prestigious area to live in. Very few of the houses from the pre-industrial epoch remain, but old Limhamn is characterized by owner-occupied brick houses from the late 19th and early 20th century, many of which originally were owner-build working class houses for one, two or three families. Blue-collar workers, craftsmen, and white-collar workers dominate.

== Miscellaneous topics ==
During the interwar years, Hermann Göring piloted the first mail-carrying seaplane, on the route Limhamn - Warnemünde, probably while being employed at Svenska Lufttrafik. He lived for a while at Linnégatan 12 in Limhamn.

The Paleocene bird Scaniornis was described from fossil bones aged some 60 million years or more, which were found in the Limnhamn limestone; it was apparently a waterbird and might have been an early flamingo relative. At that time, the Limnhamn region was located as far south as central Germany today due to plate tectonics, and as it was warmer and somewhat more humid than today had a climate more comparable to the French Mediterranean or the Black Sea.

Skanska, the fifth largest construction company in the world, originated in Malmö/Limhamn. The Cristo Redentor statue of Rio de Janeiro, Brasil is partly built using Limhamn concrete.

== Books about Limhamn ==
- Ed. Håkansson, Mats: Limhamn:Från stenålder till nutid (Stiftelsen Gerhard Larssons Minne 1994) ISBN 91-630-2747-X
