= Västra Klagstorp =

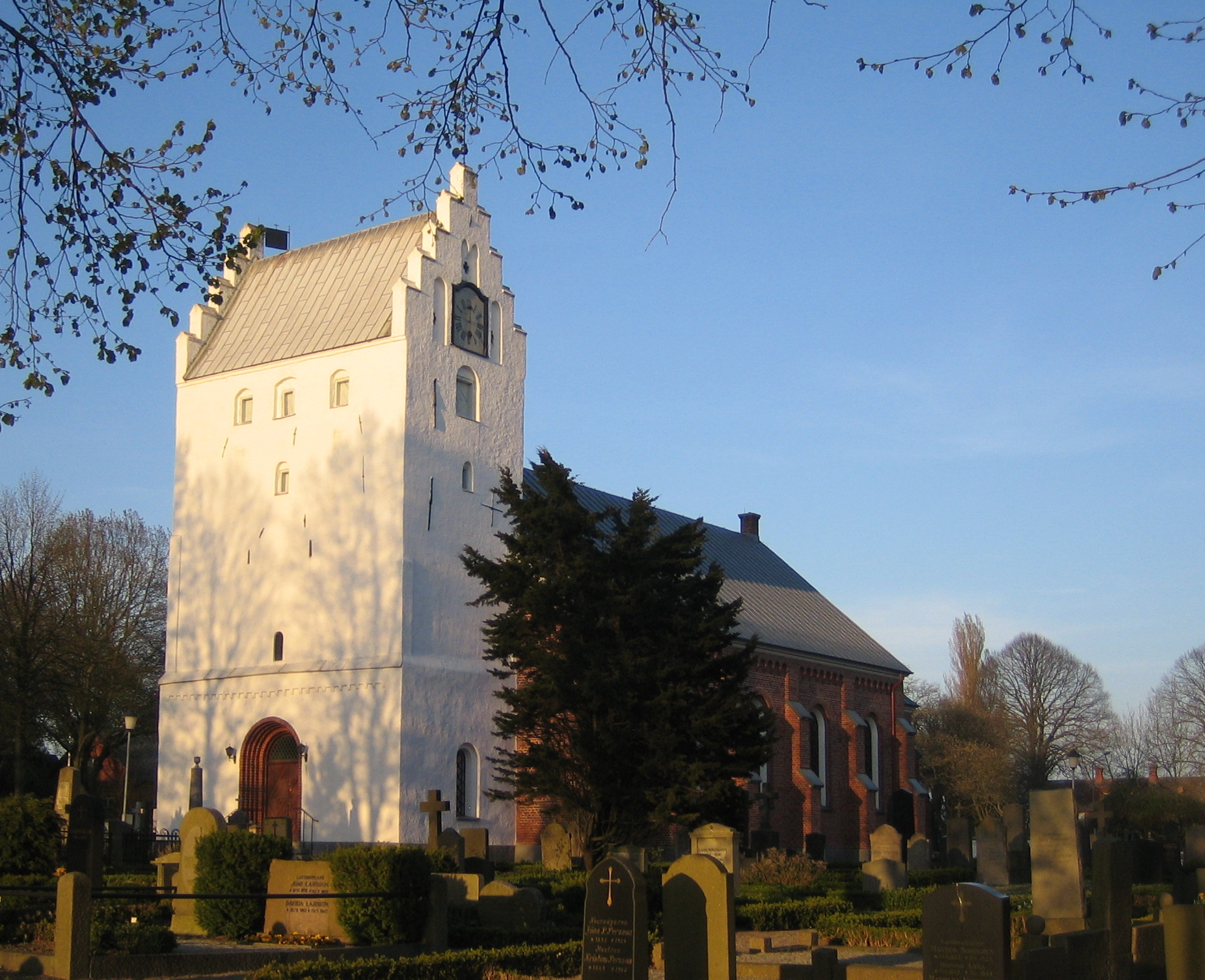
- Västra Klagstorp church

- Location within Skåne Location within Sweden
- Coordinates: 55°32′N 12°59′E
- Country: Sweden
- Province: Skåne
- County: Skåne County
- Municipality: Malmö Municipality

Area
  - Total: 0.27 km^{2} (0.10 sq mi)

Population (31 December 2010)
  - Total: 279
  - Density: 1,018/km^{2} (2,640/sq mi)
- Time zone: UTC+1 (CET)
  - Summer (DST): UTC+2 (CEST)

Västra Klagstorp was a locality situated in Malmö Municipality, Skåne County, Sweden with 279 inhabitants in 2010. By 2015, it was considered merged into Tygelsjö.
