= Limhamns hamnområde =

Neighbourhood of Malmö, Sweden

- Neighbourhood
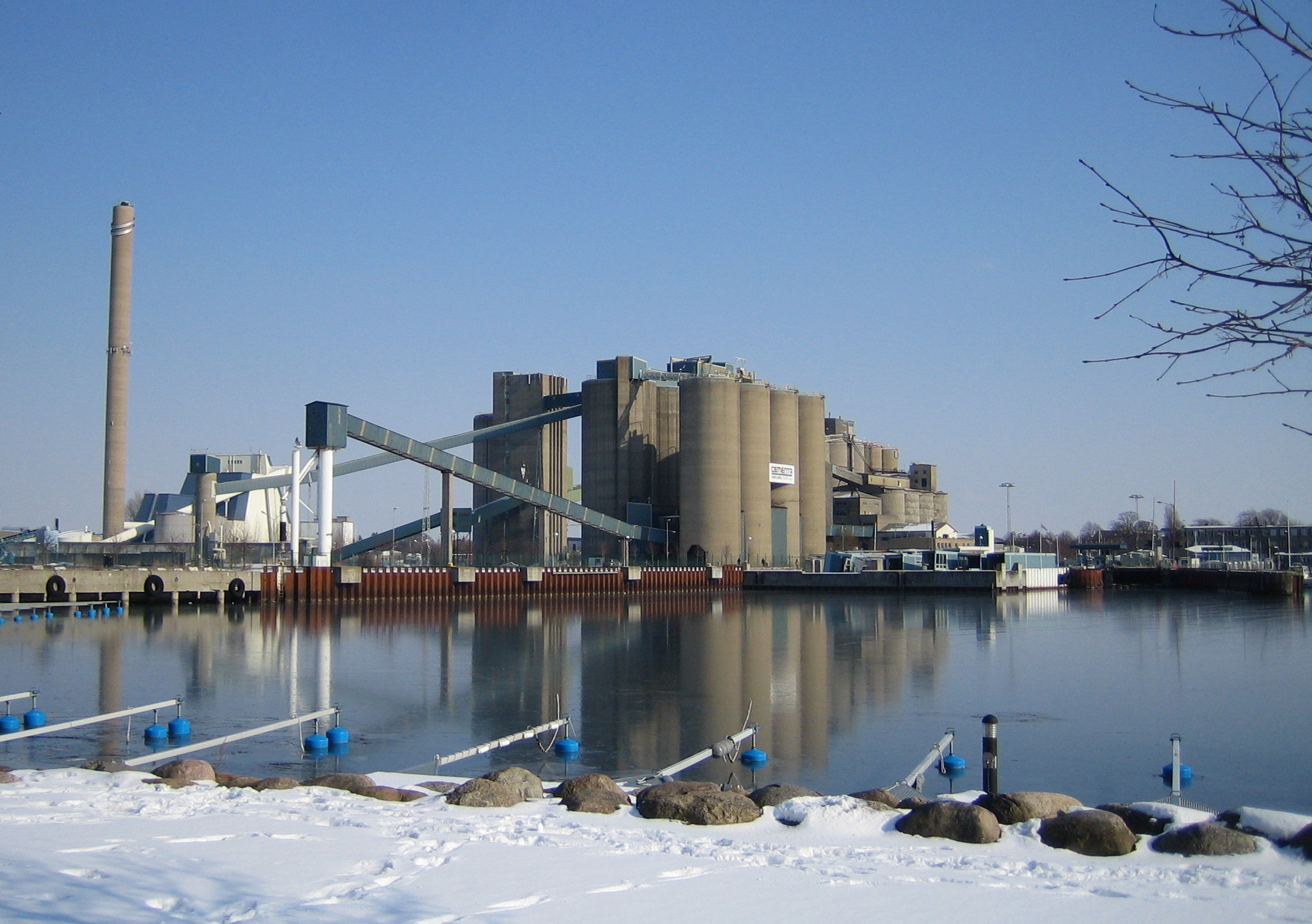
- Interactive map of Limhamns hamnområde
- Coordinates: 55°35′17″N 12°55′37″E
- Country: Sweden
- Province: Skåne
- County: Skåne County
- Municipality: Malmö Municipality
- Borough of Malmö: Limhamn-Bunkeflo

Population (2021)
  - Total: 9,323
- Time zone: UTC+1 (CET)
  - Summer (DST): UTC+2 (CEST)

Limhamns hamnområde is a neighbourhood of Malmö, situated in the Borough of Limhamn-Bunkeflo, Malmö Municipality, Skåne County, Sweden.
