= Nya Bellevue =

- Neighbourhood
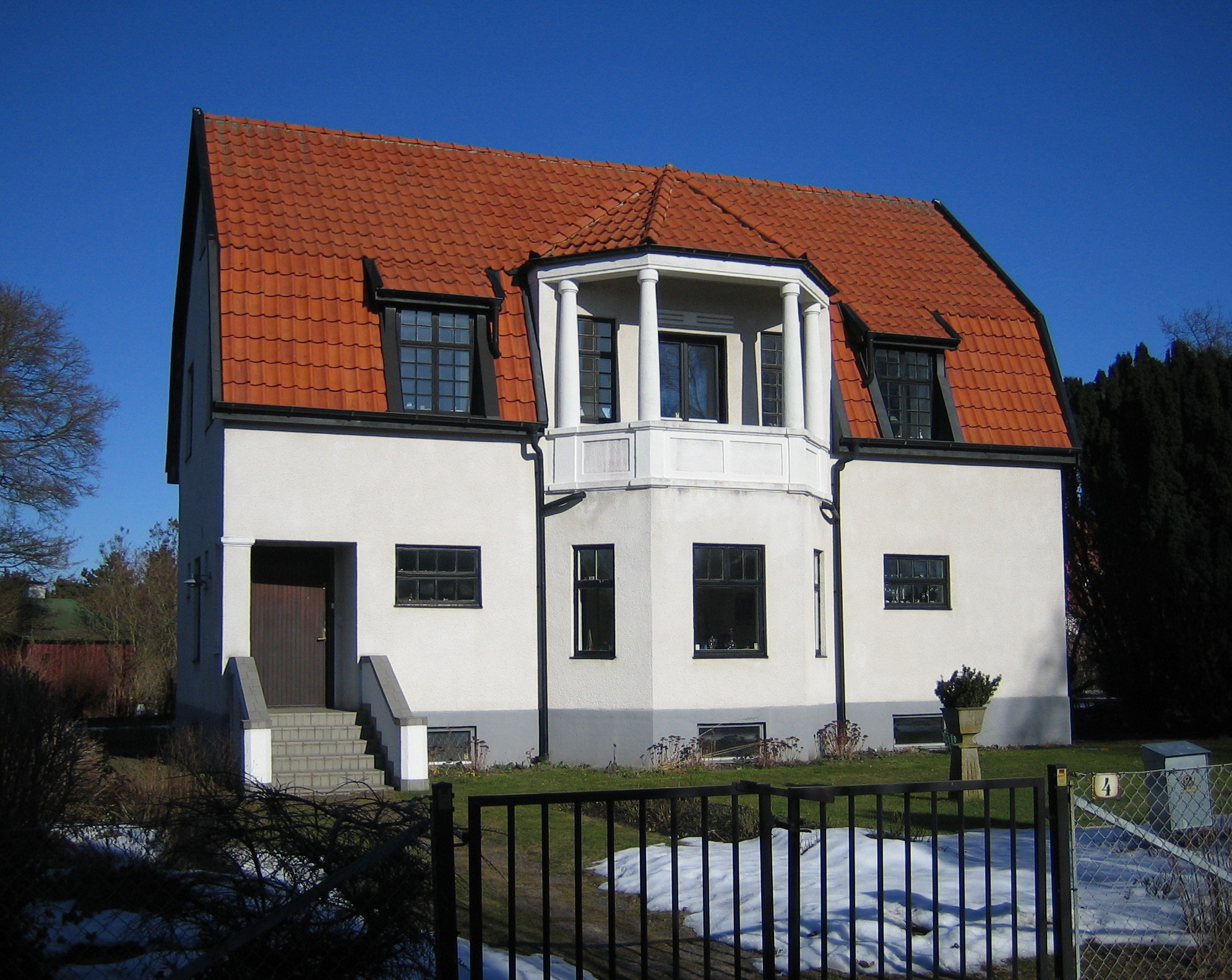
- Interactive map of Nya Bellevue
- Coordinates: 55°35′09″N 12°57′41″E
- Country: Sweden
- Province: Skåne
- County: Skåne County
- Municipality: Malmö Municipality
- Borough of Malmö: Limhamn-Bunkeflo

Population (2021)
  - Total: 1,013
- Time zone: UTC+1 (CET)
  - Summer (DST): UTC+2 (CEST)

Nya Bellevue is a neighbourhood of Malmö, situated in the Borough of Limhamn-Bunkeflo, Malmö Municipality, Skåne County, Sweden.
