= Tygelsjö vång =

- Neighbourhood
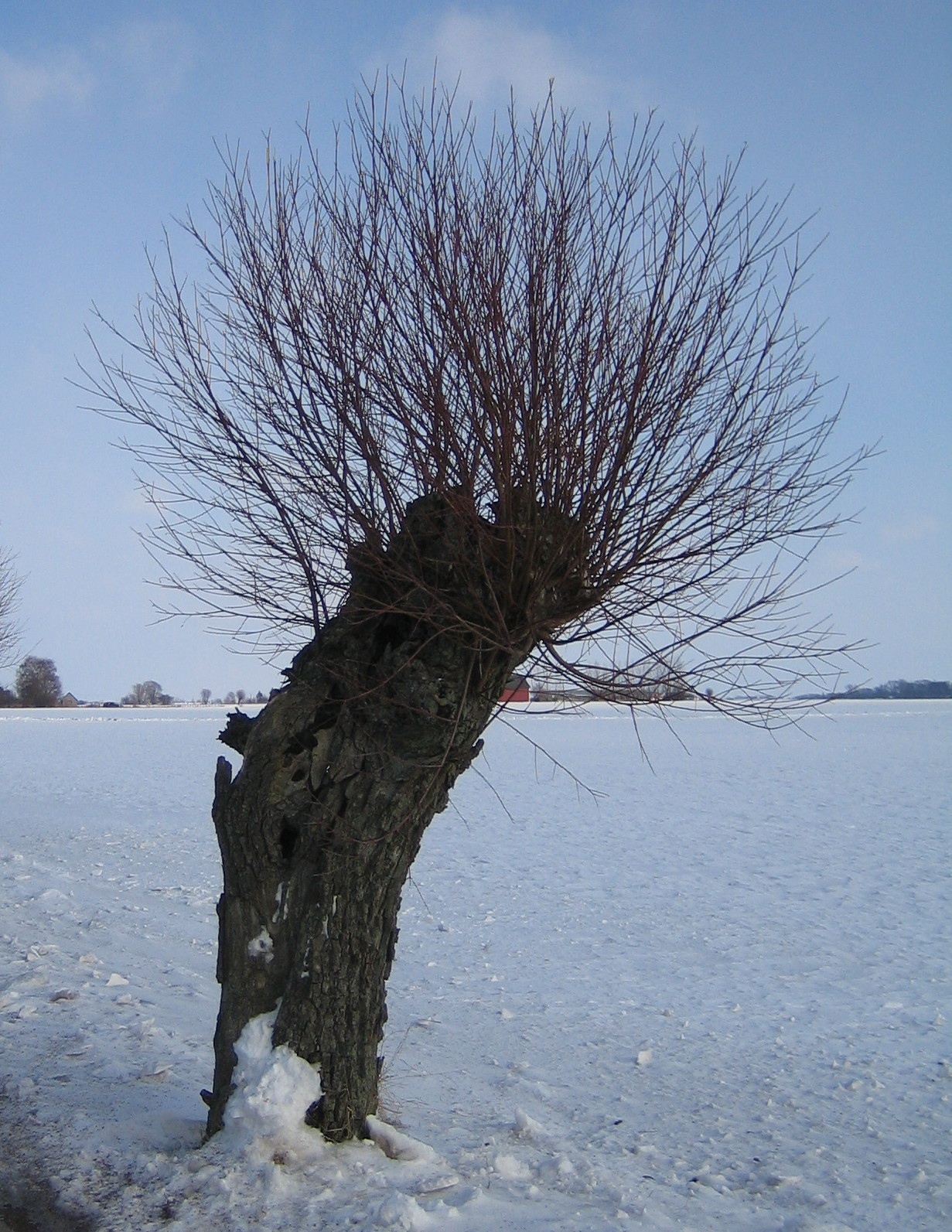
- Interactive map of Tygelsjö vång
- Coordinates: 55°30′47″N 12°57′44″E
- Country: Sweden
- Province: Skåne
- County: Skåne County
- Municipality: Malmö Municipality
- Borough of Malmö: Limhamn-Bunkeflo

Population (2021)
  - Total: 215
- Time zone: UTC+1 (CET)
  - Summer (DST): UTC+2 (CEST)

Tygelsjö vång is a neighbourhood of Malmö, situated in the Borough of Limhamn-Bunkeflo, Malmö Municipality, Skåne County, Sweden.
