= Djupadal =

Neighbourhood of Malmö, Sweden

- Neighbourhood
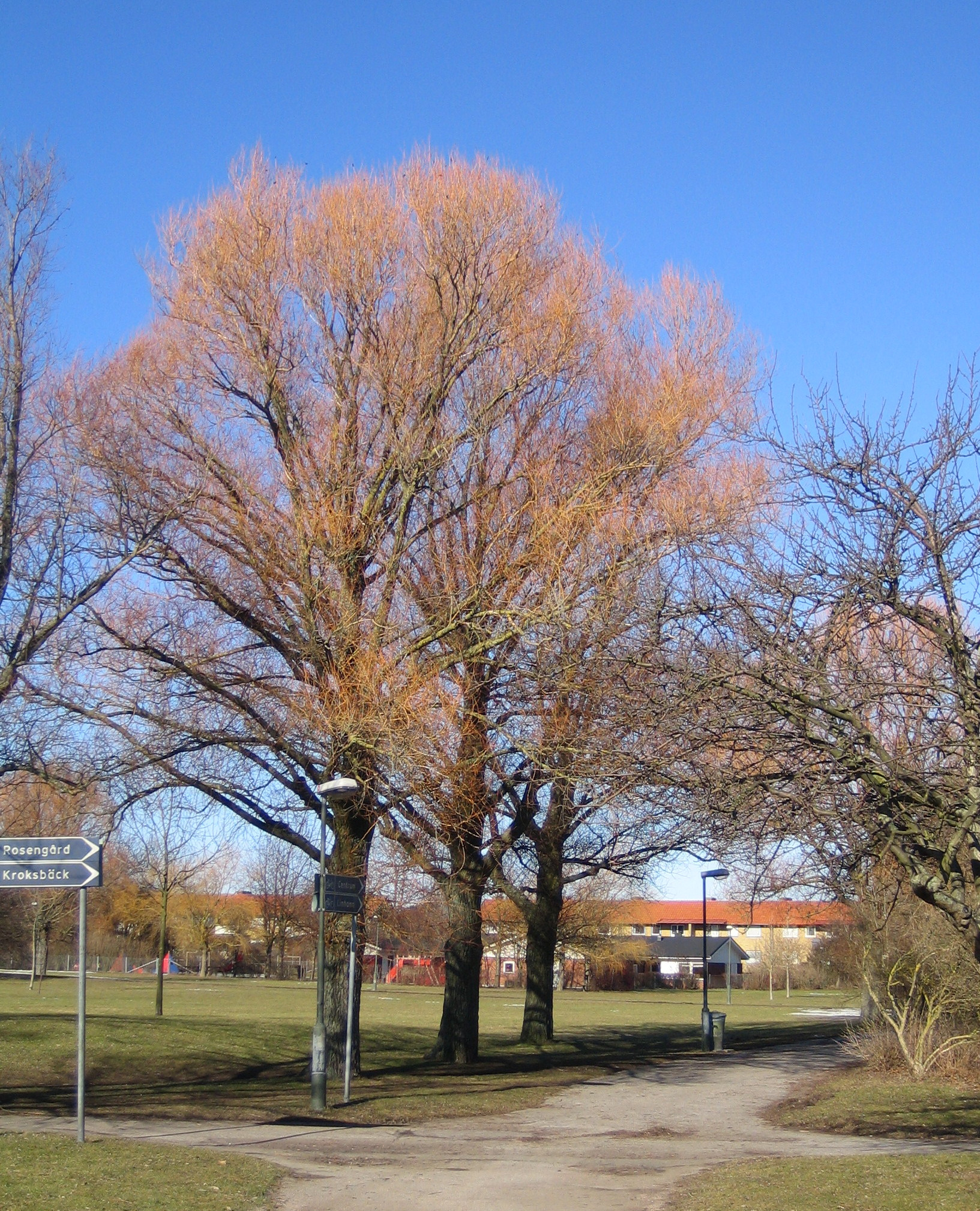
- Interactive map of Djupadal
- Coordinates: 55°34′27″N 12°57′10″E
- Country: Sweden
- Province: Skåne
- County: Skåne County
- Municipality: Malmö Municipality
- Borough of Malmö: Limhamn-Bunkeflo

Population (2021)
  - Total: 4,215
- Time zone: UTC+1 (CET)
  - Summer (DST): UTC+2 (CEST)

Djupadal is a neighbourhood of Malmö. It is situated in the Borough of Limhamn-Bunkeflo, Malmö Municipality, Skåne County, Sweden.

== Notable persons ==
- Jonathan Conricus (born 1979), Swedish-Israeli IDF Lieutenant-Colonel (ret), IDF International Spokesperson
- Björn Jónsson (1846–1912), minister for Iceland
