= Naffentorp =

- Neighbourhood
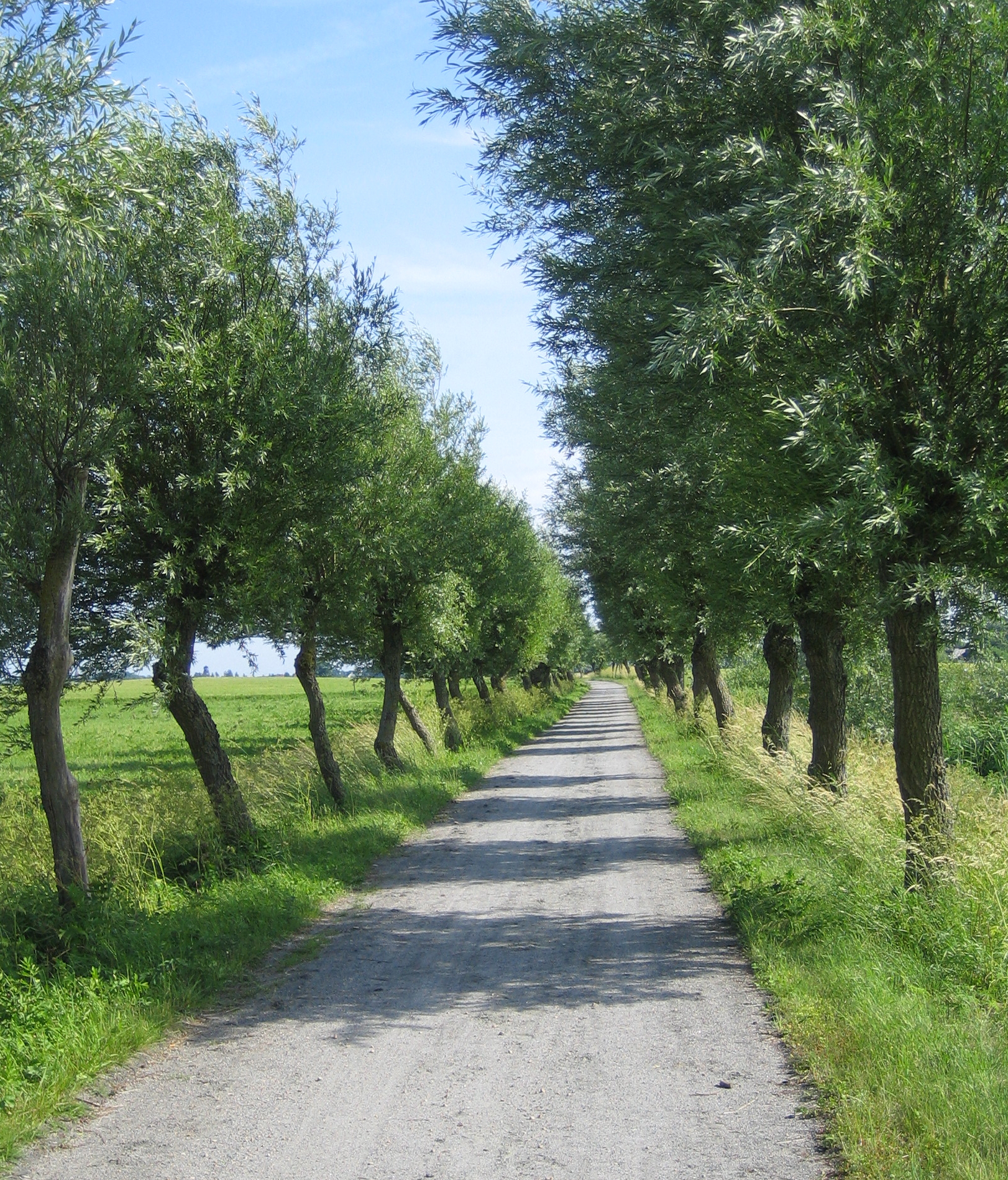
- Interactive map of Naffentorp
- Coordinates: 55°32′37″N 12°58′44″E
- Country: Sweden
- Province: Skåne
- County: Skåne County
- Municipality: Malmö Municipality
- Borough of Malmö: Limhamn-Bunkeflo

Population (1 January 2011)
  - Total: 39
- Time zone: UTC+1 (CET)
  - Summer (DST): UTC+2 (CEST)

Naffentorp is a neighbourhood of Malmö, situated in the Borough of Limhamn-Bunkeflo, Malmö Municipality, Skåne County, Sweden.
