= Sibbarp, Malmö =

Sibbarp
- Neighbourhood
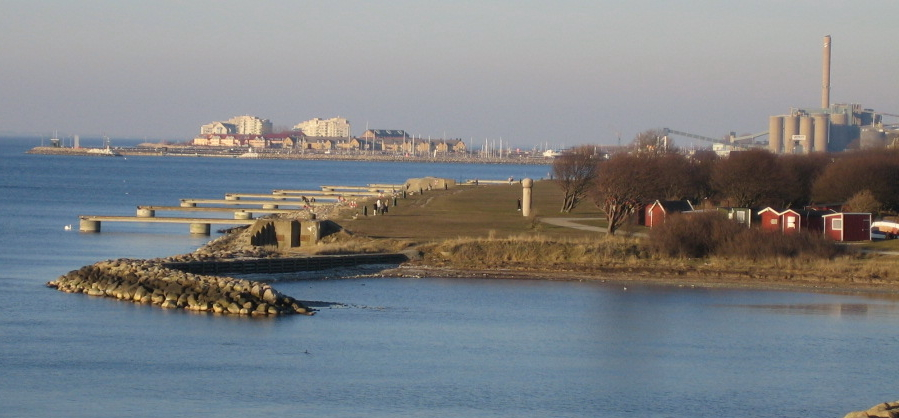
- Interactive map of Sibbarp
- Coordinates: 55°34′32″N 12°54′47″E
- Country: Sweden
- Province: Skåne
- County: Skåne County
- Municipality: Malmö Municipality
- Borough of Malmö: Väster

Population (2021)
  - Total: 4,622
- Time zone: UTC+1 (CET)
  - Summer (DST): UTC+2 (CEST)

Sibbarp is a neighbourhood of Malmö, situated in the Borough of Väster, Malmö Municipality, Skåne County, Sweden.
