= Bellevue, Malmö =

Neighbourhood in Malmö, Sweden

Bellevue
- Neighbourhood
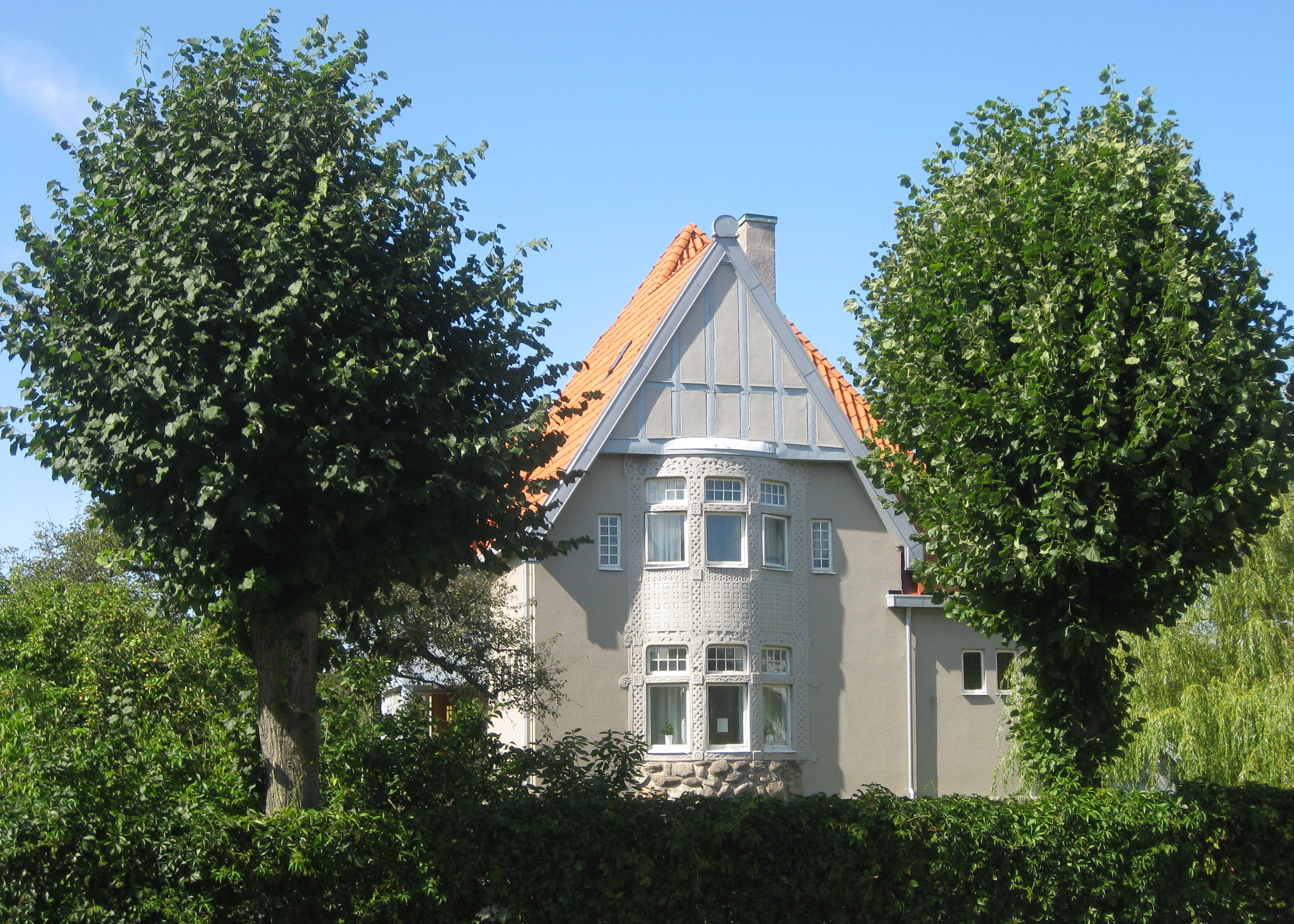
- Interactive map of Bellevue
- Coordinates: 55°35′25″N 12°57′03″E
- Country: Sweden
- Province: Skåne
- County: Skåne County
- Municipality: Malmö Municipality
- Borough of Malmö: Limhamn-Bunkeflo

Population (2021)
  - Total: 1,175
- Time zone: UTC+1 (CET)
  - Summer (DST): UTC+2 (CEST)

Bellevue is a neighbourhood of Malmö, situated in the Borough of Limhamn-Bunkeflo, Malmö Municipality, Skåne County, Sweden. On the opposite site of the sound is Bellevue Strand.
