= Rosenvång =

- Neighbourhood
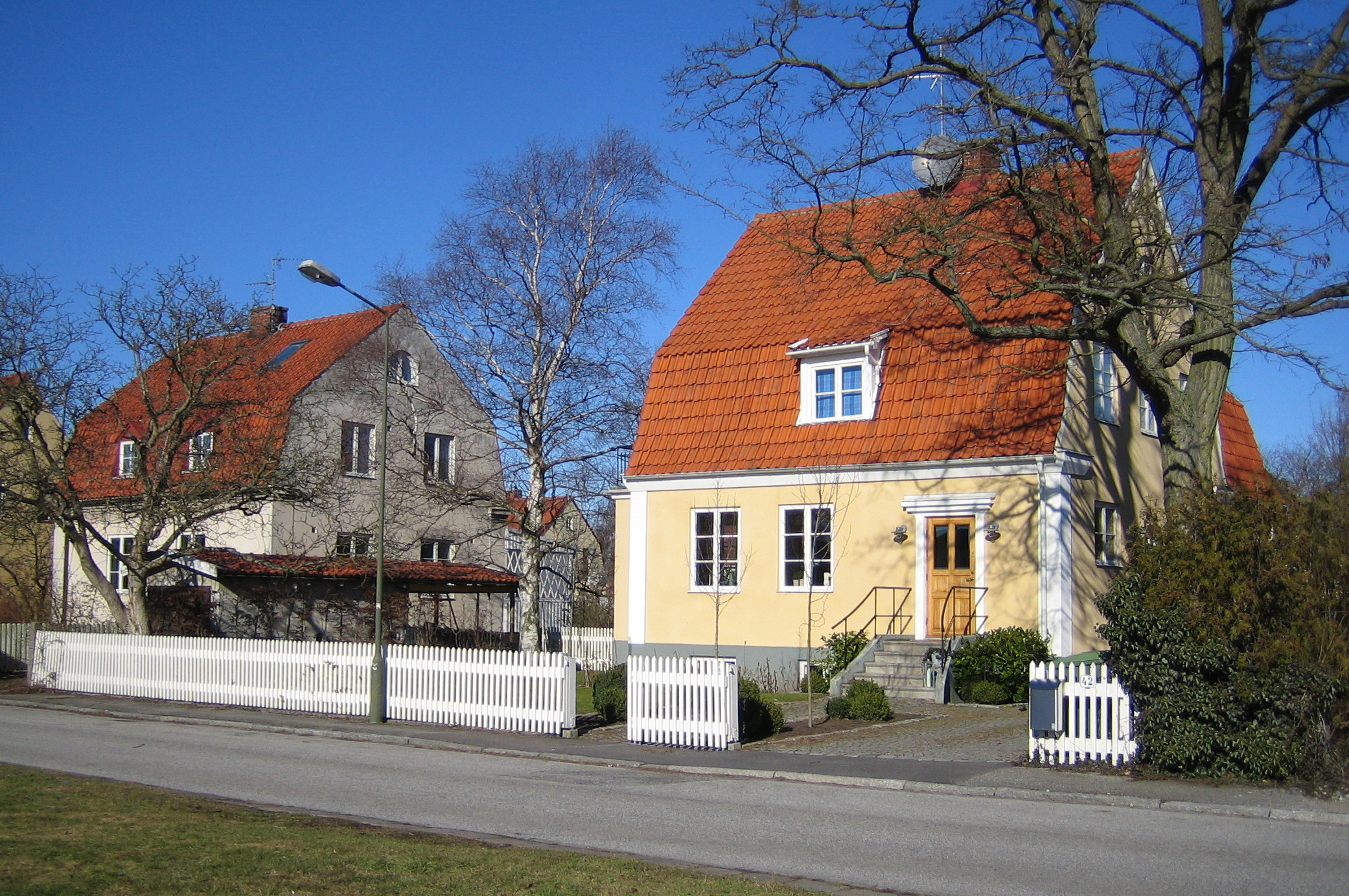
- Interactive map of Rosenvång
- Coordinates: 55°34′55″N 12°57′21″E
- Country: Sweden
- Province: Skåne
- County: Skåne County
- Municipality: Malmö Municipality
- Borough of Malmö: Limhamn-Bunkeflo

Population (2021)
  - Total: 2,393
- Time zone: UTC+1 (CET)
  - Summer (DST): UTC+2 (CEST)

Rosenvång is a neighbourhood of Malmö, situated in the Borough of Limhamn-Bunkeflo, Malmö Municipality, Skåne County, Sweden.
