= Elinelund =

Neighbourhood of Malmö, Sweden

- Neighbourhood
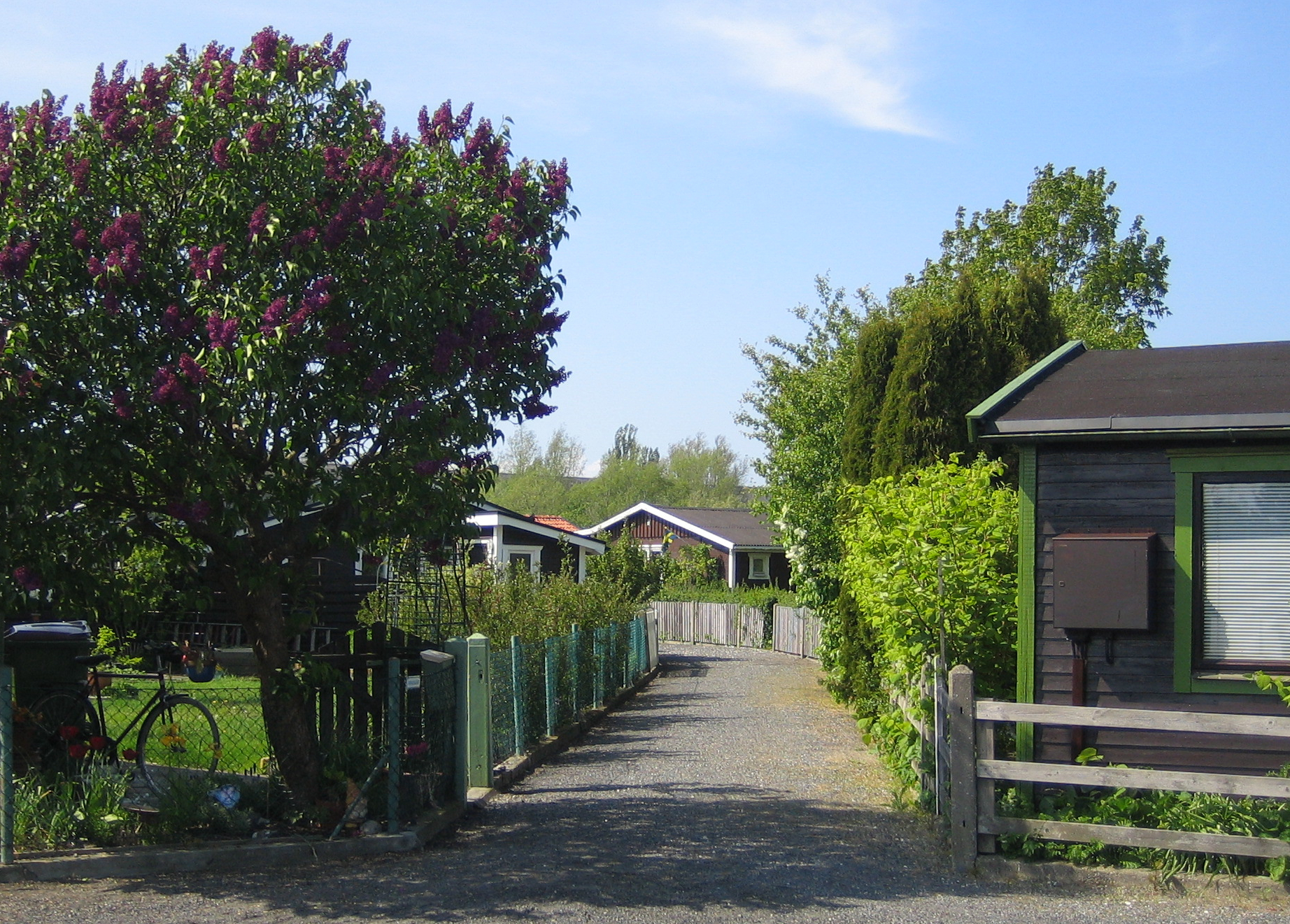
- Interactive map of Elinelund
- Coordinates: 55°34′47″N 12°57′08″E
- Country: Sweden
- Province: Skåne
- County: Skåne County
- Municipality: Malmö Municipality
- Borough of Malmö: Limhamn-Bunkeflo

Population (2021)
  - Total: 1,621
- Time zone: UTC+1 (CET)
  - Summer (DST): UTC+2 (CEST)

Elinelund is a neighbourhood of Malmö, situated in the Borough of Limhamn-Bunkeflo, Malmö Municipality, Skåne County, Sweden.
