= Skumparp =

- Neighbourhood
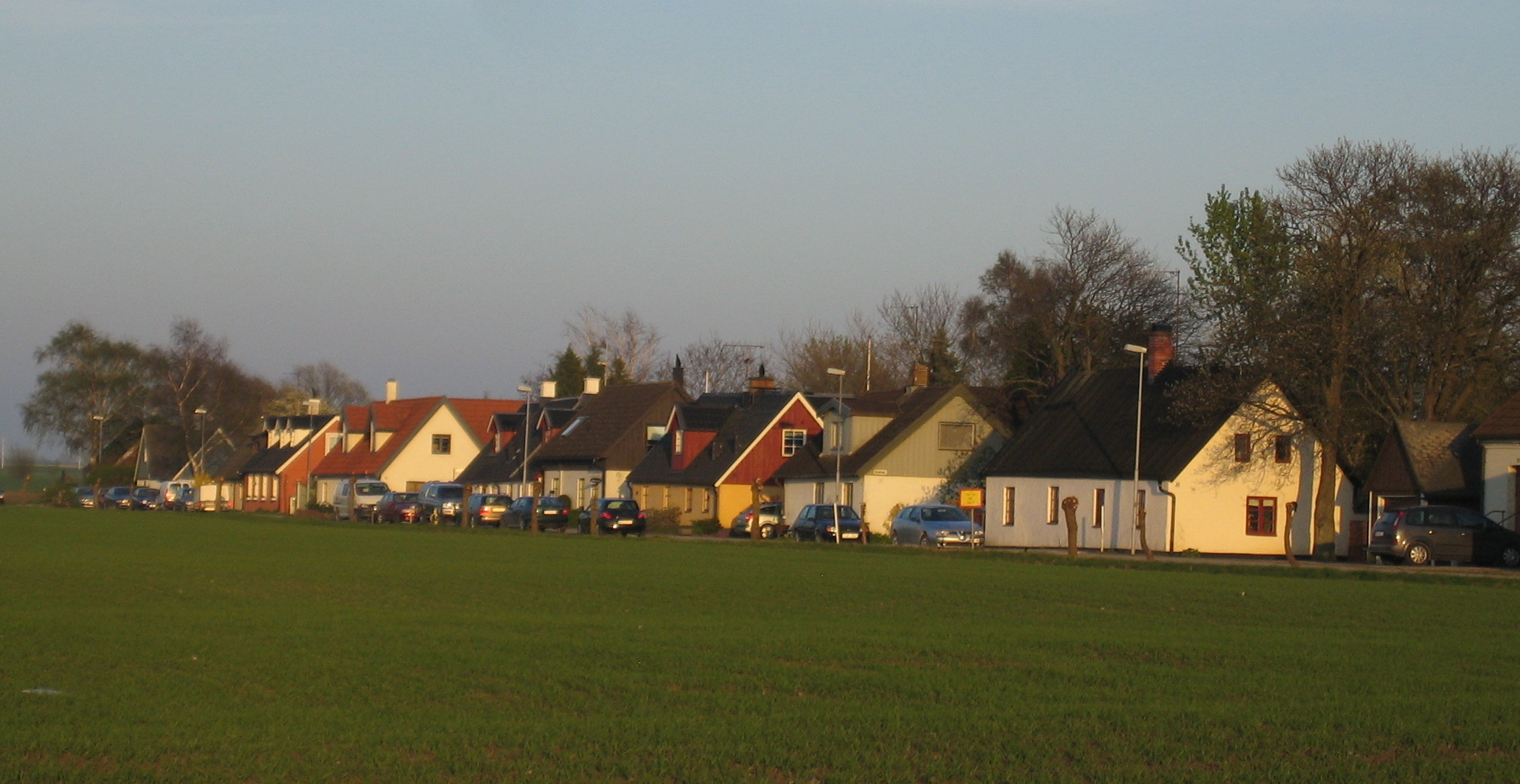
- Interactive map of Skumparp
- Coordinates: 55°32′20″N 12°58′00″E
- Country: Sweden
- Province: Skåne
- County: Skåne County
- Municipality: Malmö Municipality
- Borough of Malmö: Limhamn-Bunkeflo

Area
  - Total: 0.15 km^{2} (0.058 sq mi)

Population (31 December 2010)
  - Total: 205
  - Density: 1,329/km^{2} (3,440/sq mi)
- Time zone: UTC+1 (CET)
  - Summer (DST): UTC+2 (CEST)

Skumparp is a neighbourhood of Malmö, situated in the Borough of Limhamn-Bunkeflo, Malmö Municipality, Skåne County, Sweden. It is also a locality and had 205 inhabitants in 2010.
