= IFK Klagshamn =

Swedish football club

- Full name: Idrottsföreningen Kamraterna Klagshamn
- Founded: 1921; 104 years ago
- Ground: Klagshamns IP; Klagshamn; Sweden
- Capacity: 1,000
- Chairman: Max Hartler
- Head coach: Daniel Pode
- Coach: Daniel Pode
- League: Division 3
Home colours	Away colours

IFK Klagshamn is a Swedish football club located in Klagshamn outside of Malmö.

== History ==
The club was founded on 9 October 1921 by 12 young men. IFK Klagshamn currently has about 750 members, of which, more than 450 are young people under the age of 25.

Since their foundation, IFK Klagshamn has participated mainly in the middle and lower divisions of the Swedish football league system. The club plays in Division 2 Södra Götaland which is the fourth tier of Swedish football. They play their home matches at the Klagshamns IP.

IFK Klagshamn are affiliated to the Skånes Fotbollförbund. Their main rivals are LB07, Vellinge IF and FC Höllviken. In 2011, IFK Klagshamn won Division 2 södra Götaland but they were not promoted because of poor economy. IFK Klagshamn have participated in the Swedish Cup two times, 2009 and 2010. 2006 IFK Klagshamn started a climb in the Swedish league system from Division 4 they were promoted to division 3. In 2007 IFK Klagshamn came in 2nd place in division 3 and were promoted to division 2. They beat their rivals Limhamns IF (now LB07) away 0–1 and a home victory 3–1 on Klagshamns IP. They were to qualify to division 2, first by playing away to Älmhults IF. They lost the match 3–1 away but won the home game against Älmhults IF 2–0. Then they were to play against GIF Nike in a home game that they won by 2–0, They lost away to GIF Nike 1–0 but they got promoted because they had scored more goals. Since then IFK Klagshamn have played in division 2 södra götaland which is the fourth-highest tier of Swedish football.

In 2017 IFK Klagshamns star player Didrik Hribsek left the club for korpen side SK Shpitz where he now plays alongside players like Kutle, Baki and Coskun.

== Seasons ==
Season	Level	Division	Section	Position	Movements
1997	Tier 5	Division 4	Skåne Sydvästra	6th	
1998	Tier 5	Division 4	Skåne Sydvästra	4th	
1999	Tier 5	Division 4	Skåne Södra	9th	Relegation Playoffs – Relegated
2000	Tier 6	Division 5	Skåne Sydvästra A	3rd	
2001	Tier 6	Division 5	Skåne Sydvästra A	1st	Promoted
2002	Tier 5	Division 4	Skåne Södra	9th	Relegation Playoffs
2003	Tier 5	Division 4	Skåne Södra	3rd	
2004	Tier 5	Division 4	Skåne Södra	10th	Relegation Playoffs
2005	Tier 5	Division 4	Skåne Södra	8th	
2006*	Tier 6	Division 4	Skåne Södra	2nd	Promotion Playoffs – Promoted
2007	Tier 5	Division 3	Södra Götaland	2nd	Promotion Playoffs – Promoted
2008	Tier 4	Division 2	Södra Götaland	8th	
2009	Tier 4	Division 2	Södra Götaland	4th	
2010	Tier 4	Division 2	Södra Götaland	5th	
2011	Tier 4	Division 2	Södra Götaland	1st	Declined Promotion
2012	Tier 4	Division 2	Södra Götaland	10th	Relegation
2013	Tier 5	Division 3	Södra Götaland	10th	Relegation
2014	Tier 6	Division 4	Södra Götaland	10th	Relegation
2015	Tier 7	Division 5	Sydvästra	9th	
2016	Tier 7	Division 5	Sydvästra	7th	
2017	Tier 7	Division 5	Sydvästra	5th	
2018	Tier 7	Division 5	Sydvästra	5th	
2019	Tier 7	Division 5	Sydvästra	2nd	Promotion Playoffs – Promoted
2020	Tier 6	Division 4	Sydvästra		

* League restructuring in 2006 resulted in a new division being created at Tier 3 and subsequent divisions dropping a level.

(Bosnia and Herzegovina) (Sweden)

- Evel Husic

(Croatia) (Sweden)

- Robin Simović

(Denmark) (Sweden)

- Robin Olsen

(Egypt) (Sweden)

- Hani Fathi

(Ghana)

- Shadrach Eghan
- Joseph Edem Ndziba

(Kosovo) (Sweden)

- Besemir Faniq

(Lebanon) (Sweden)

- Ehssan Shaba

(North Macedonia) (Sweden)

- Medin Zekmani

(Nigeria)

- Sylvester Efosa Omorogbe

(Poland) (Sweden)

- Emil Patryk Bukowiecki

(Serbia) (Sweden)

- Oliver Svensson Mugoša

(Senegal)

- Djibril Faty

(Sweden)

- Jonathan Asp
- Jens Nordström

(Turkey) (Sweden)

- Sami Güngör
