= Jonathan Conricus =

Israeli military spokesman

- יהונתן קונריקוס
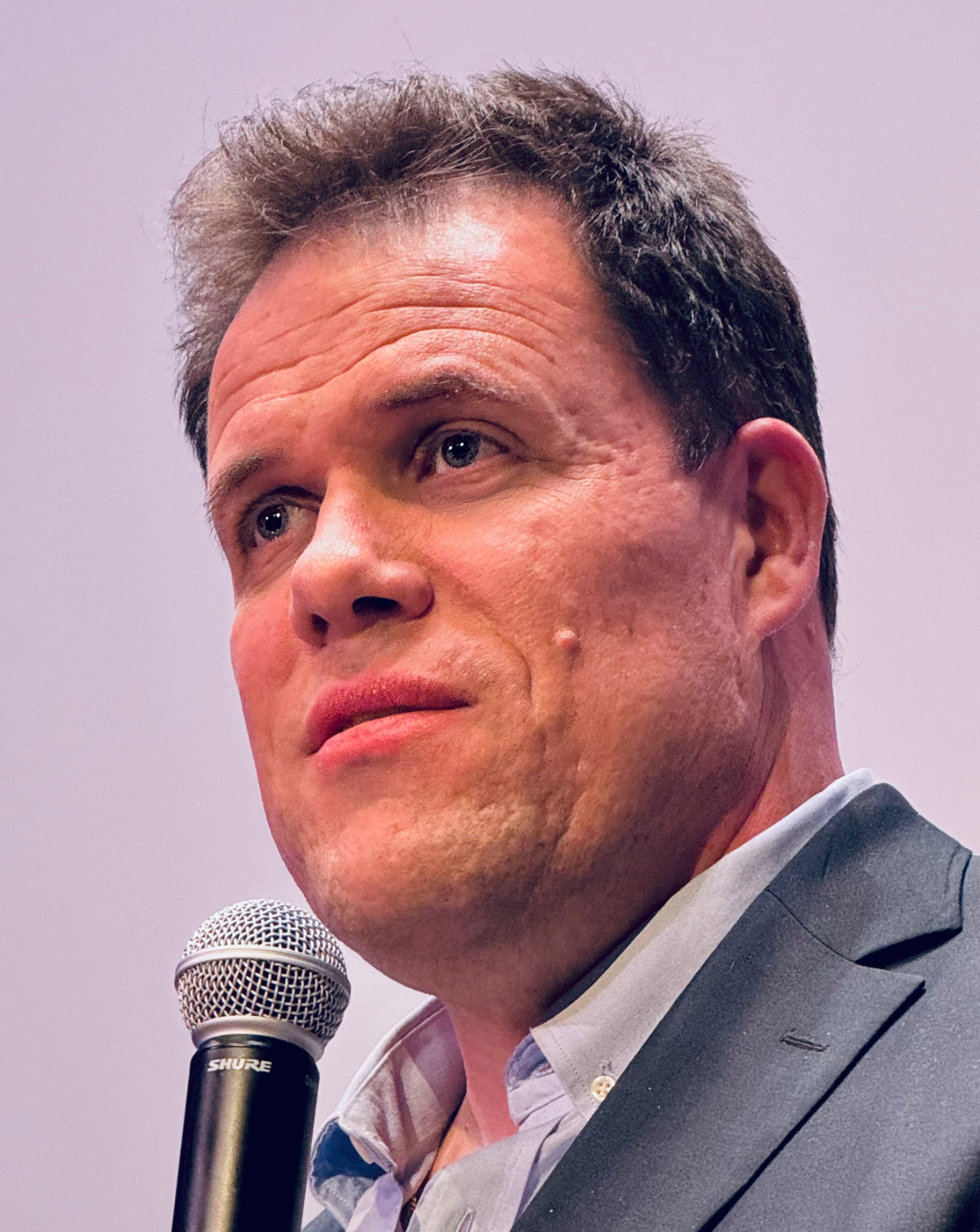
- Born: August 14, 1979 (age 47); Jerusalem, Israel
- Alma mater: Hebrew University of Jerusalem
- Children: 4
- Military career
- Allegiance: Israel Defense Forces
- Branch: Israeli Ground Forces; Operations Directorate
- Service years: 1997–2021, 2023
- Rank: Lieutenant-Colonel
- Known for: IDF International Spokesperson
- Other work: Senior fellow at the Foundation for Defense of Democracies

Jonathan Conricus (Hebrew: יהונתן קונריקוס; born August 14, 1979) is a Swedish-Israeli spokesperson and media commentator. He was the international spokesperson of the Israel Defense Forces from 2017 to 2021 and again in 2023. Conricus is a senior fellow at the think tank Foundation for Defense of Democracies, based in Washington, DC, in the United States. He was an officer in the Israel Defense Forces (IDF), in which he served for 24 years before returning to duty as a reservist in 2023.

== Early and personal life ==
Conricus is the son of an Israeli mother and a Swedish father. He was born in Jerusalem, Israel, and raised in Malmö, Sweden—in Hyllie and Djupadal. His grandfather, Daniel Bornstein, grew up in Oświęcim in Poland, where Nazi Germany operated the Auschwitz concentration camp, and was a Holocaust survivor along with his sister. The rest of Bornstein's family was murdered.

When he was 13 years of age, Conricus and his family moved back to Israel. He graduated with a BA in Middle Eastern and Military Studies from the Hebrew University of Jerusalem. He speaks the Swedish Scanian dialect. He and his wife have four children.

== Israel Defense Forces and diplomatic career ==
Conricus spent 24 years in the Israel Defense Forces (IDF), from 1997 to 2021, and retired as a Lieutenant-Colonel before returning to duty as a reservist in 2023.

In 1997, when he was 18 years old, he was drafted into the IDF, and served in the Givati Brigade. From 1997 to 2000 he served as an infantry soldier in an elite unit in southern Lebanon. From 2000 to 2005 he served as a company commander in Gaza. He then became responsible for analyzing military doctrines of the United States, Great Britain, France, and to some extent Germany. He subsequently became a liaison officer between the IDF and United Nations peacekeeping forces – first in Lebanon (UNIFIL, 2009–11), then in the Golan Heights (UNDOF, 2011–13), and then as Deputy Chief Liaison Officer of the IDF Northern Command (2013–14).

Conricus was the international spokesperson of the IDF in the IDF Spokesperson's Unit from 2017 to 2021.

He also served as a military diplomat. Conricus served for three years, from 2014 to 2017, at the United Nations in New York City, seconded and on loan to the Office of Military Affairs of the United Nations Department of Peacekeeping Operations (DPKO). He was an Assessment Officer, and during that time he learned Arabic. He was the first Israeli officer to hold any position at the UN. He was responsible for collecting information for UN forces deployed in war zones around the world, including in Nigeria, Somalia, Congo, and Ukraine, and assessing risks.

Hours after the October 7, 2023 Hamas-led attack on Israel, Conricus returned to duty as a reservist and was appointed international spokesperson for the IDF. He served in that position for the following three months. During that time, he would commonly do 30 interviews in a 24-hour period. He gave interviews on, among others, BBC, CNN, Sky News, NBC, and ABC News. After the October 7, 2023, attack he said: "If Hamas were to come out of their hiding places.., return our hostages — all 212 of them — and surrender unconditionally, then the war would end. If they won't, we will probably have to go in and get it done."

== Current career ==
Conricus is now a senior fellow at the think tank the Foundation for Defense of Democracies, which is based in Washington, DC, in the United States. He is no longer an IDF spokesperson, nor is he a government spokesperson.

He also has a private practice public relations agency named "Conricus Communications." It focuses on strategic communications, public relations, crisis management, and media training. He returned to Conricus Communications in December 2023.

Speaking of Gaza in 2024, Conricus said: "I spent five years in Gaza before the disengagement [of Israel in 2005]. I knew we’d be back.... I was concerned we were doing it unilaterally, and we didn’t have anybody on the other side.... When you look at Gaza’s history, culture, their general disposition, and fundamental leanings, it’s very hard to imagine how Gaza could have gone anywhere other than where it is right now."

Conricus is also currently involved with Bottom Line Media.

== Literature ==
- „Jonathan Conricus: The Swedish Israeli Making the Case for Israel on the World Stage“, in: The Jerusalem Post from 8. July 2024.
- „Lt. Col. Jonathan Conricus bids Farewell: The IDF International Spokesperson Is Concluding His Service“, on the Website of the IDF
