= Klagshamn =

Neighbourhood of Malmö, Sweden

Klagshamn City
- Orten
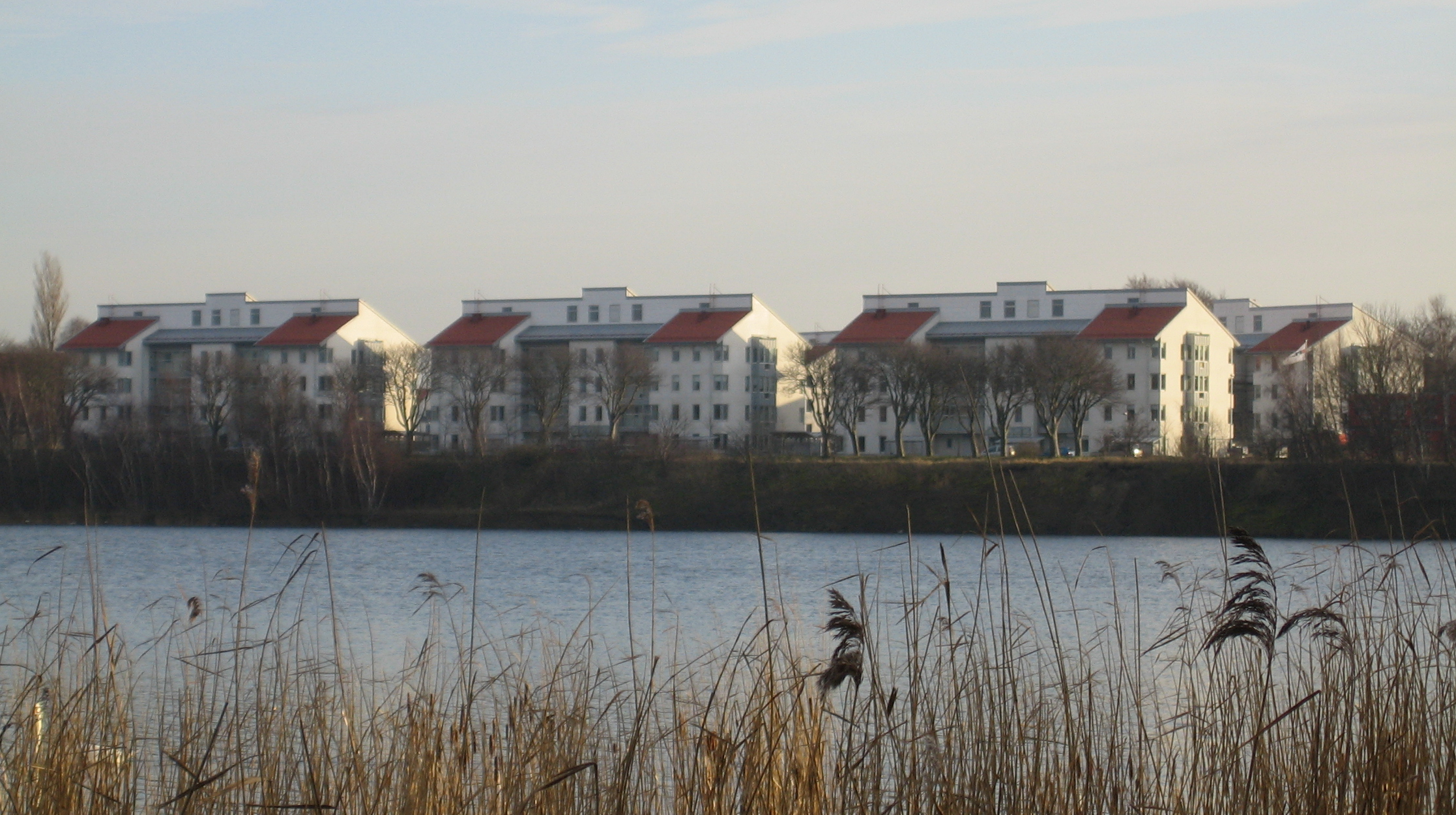
- Interactive map of Klagshamn City
- Coordinates: 55°31′36″N 12°56′08″E
- Country: Sweden
- Province: Skåne
- County: Skåne County
- Municipality: Malmö Municipality
- Borough of Malmö: Limhamn-Bunkeflo

Population (2021)
  - Total: 3,231
- Time zone: UTC+1 (CET)
  - Summer (DST): UTC+2 (CEST)

Klagshamn (Swedish pronunciation: [ˈklâkshamn]) is a neighbourhood of Malmö, situated in the Borough of Limhamn-Bunkeflo, Malmö Municipality, Skåne County, Sweden.

== Sports ==
The following sports clubs are located in Klagshamn:

- IFK Klagshamn
