= Väster, Malmö =

City district of Malmö, Sweden

Väster
- City district
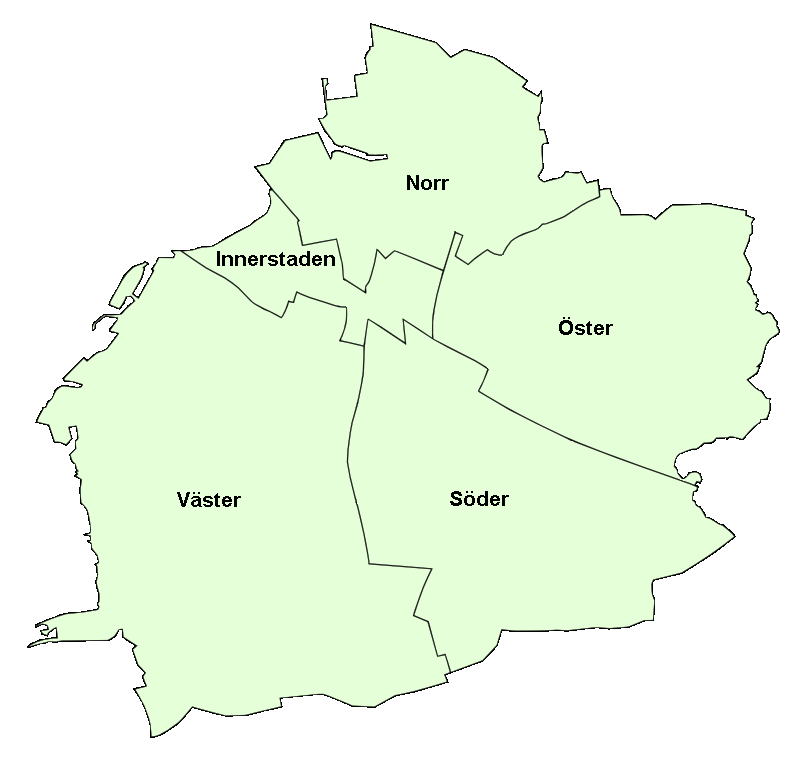
- Malmö's city districts
- Country: Sweden
- Province: Scania
- County: Skåne County
- Municipality: Malmö Municipality

Population (2013)
  - Total: 75,600
- Time zone: UTC+01:00 (CET)
  - Summer (DST): UTC+02:00 (CEST)
- Website: www.malmo.se/vaster

Väster (lit. 'West') is a city district (Swedish: stadsområde) in Malmö Municipality, Sweden. It was established on 1 July 2013 after the merger of Hyllie and Limhamn-Bunkeflo. It has a population of 75,600.
