= Limhamns kalkbrott =

Neighbourhood of Malmö, Sweden

- Neighbourhood
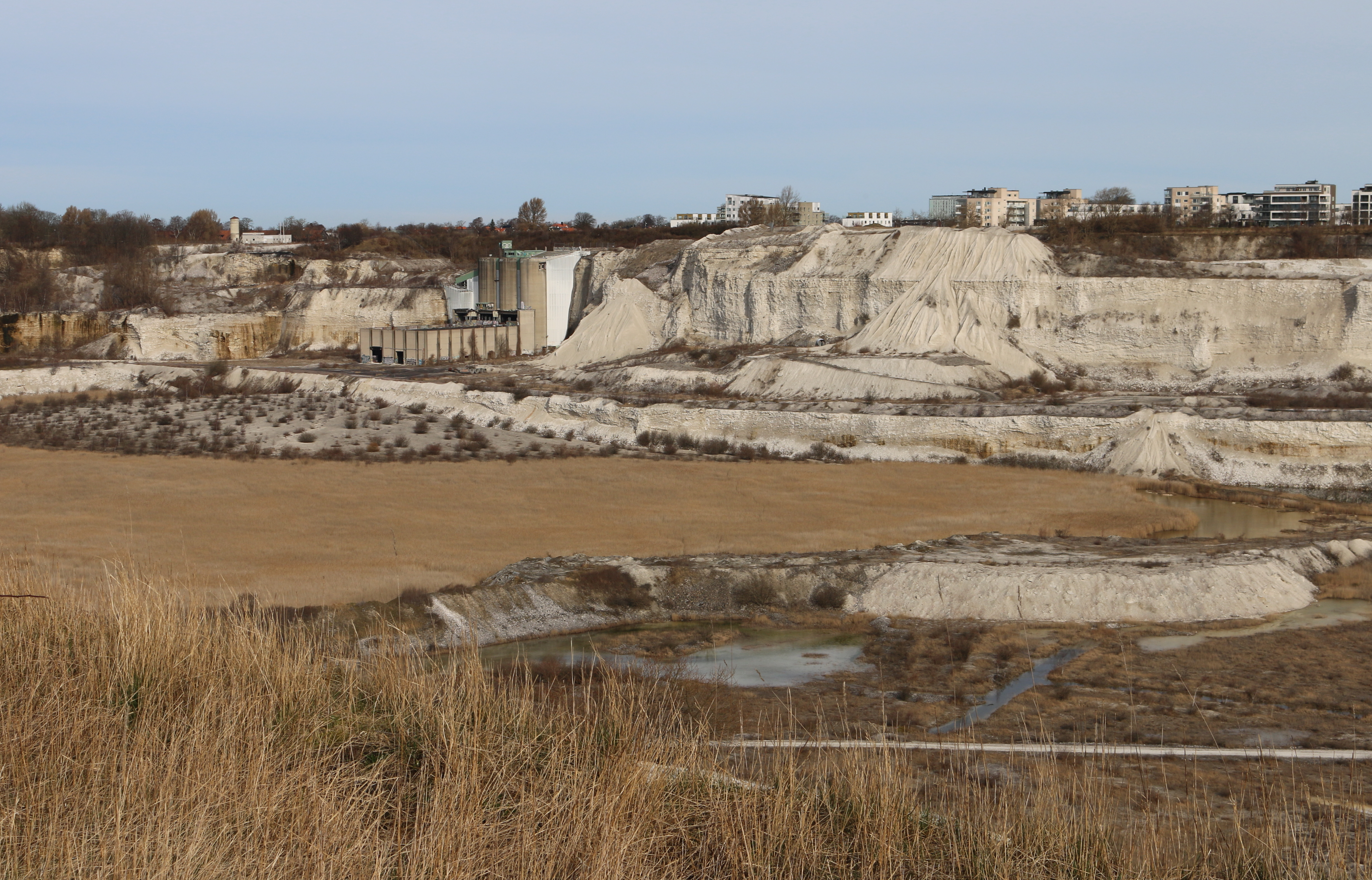
- Interactive map of Limhamns kalkbrott
- Coordinates: 55°34′05″N 12°56′10″E
- Country: Sweden
- Province: Skåne
- County: Skåne County
- Municipality: Malmö Municipality
- Borough of Malmö: Limhamn-Bunkeflo

Population (2021)
  - Total: 1,896
- Time zone: UTC+1 (CET)
  - Summer (DST): UTC+2 (CEST)

Limhamns kalkbrott (Limhamn limestone quarry) or Kalkbrottet (the limestone quarry) is situated near Malmö, in the borough of Limhamn-Bunkeflo, Malmö Municipality, Skåne County, Sweden.

The present quarry was opened in 1866 but there was a predecessor already in the 1600s. The quarry is one of the largest open-pit mines in Northern Europe, measuring 1300 by 800 meters, with a depth of 65 meters. A railway line connected the quarry to a cement factory in the port of Limhamn. In 1968 about two kilometers of the railway was placed in a tunnel to reduce air pollution. Mining of limestone in the quarry ceased in 1994. Pumping that is maintained to this day prevents the quarry from turning into a lake. The industries were torn down for housing developments in the 2010s. The open pit is a municipal nature reserve since 2011, notable for one of very few populations of the European green toad remaining in Sweden.

== Gallery ==
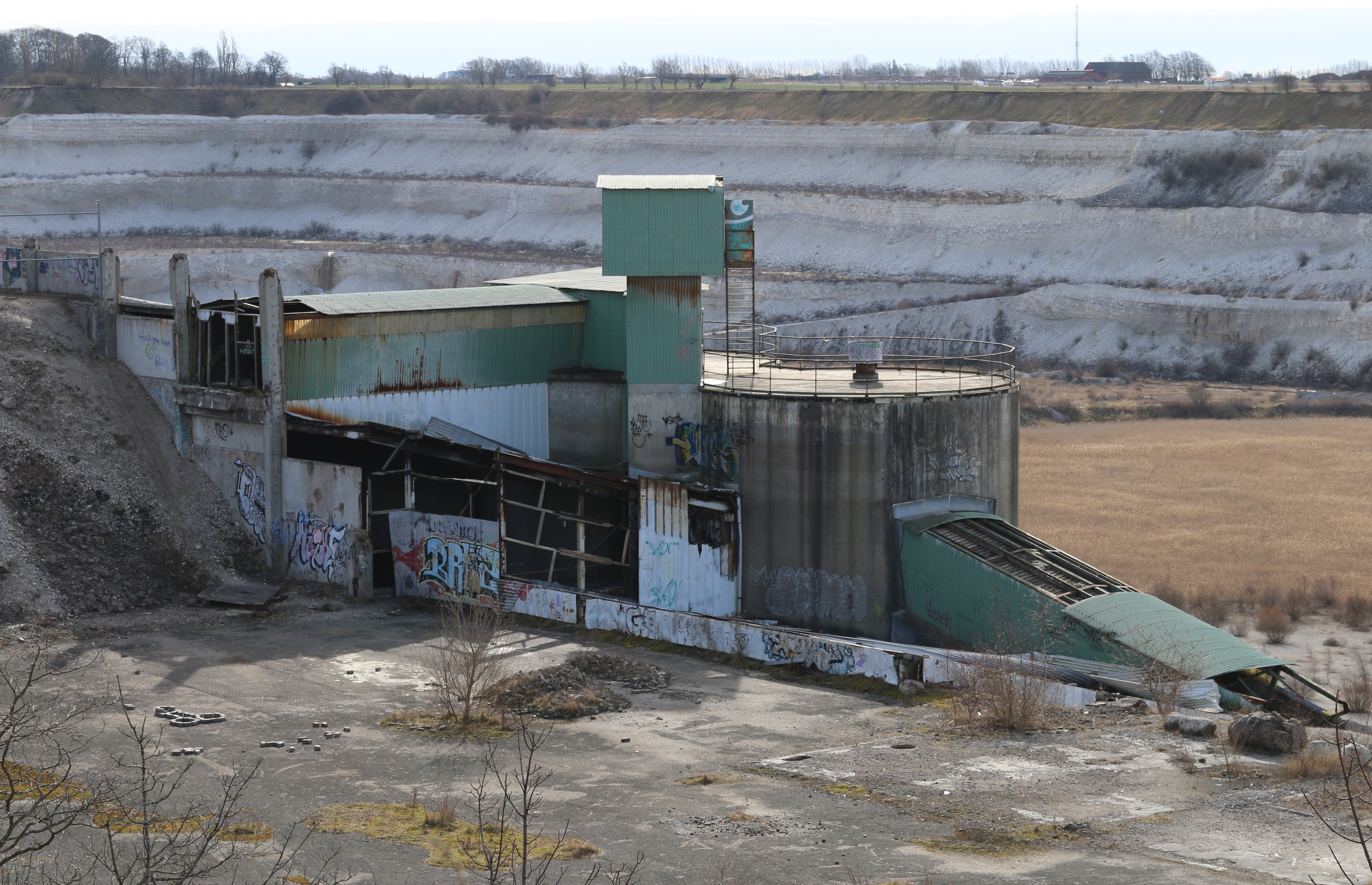
Abandoned factory building

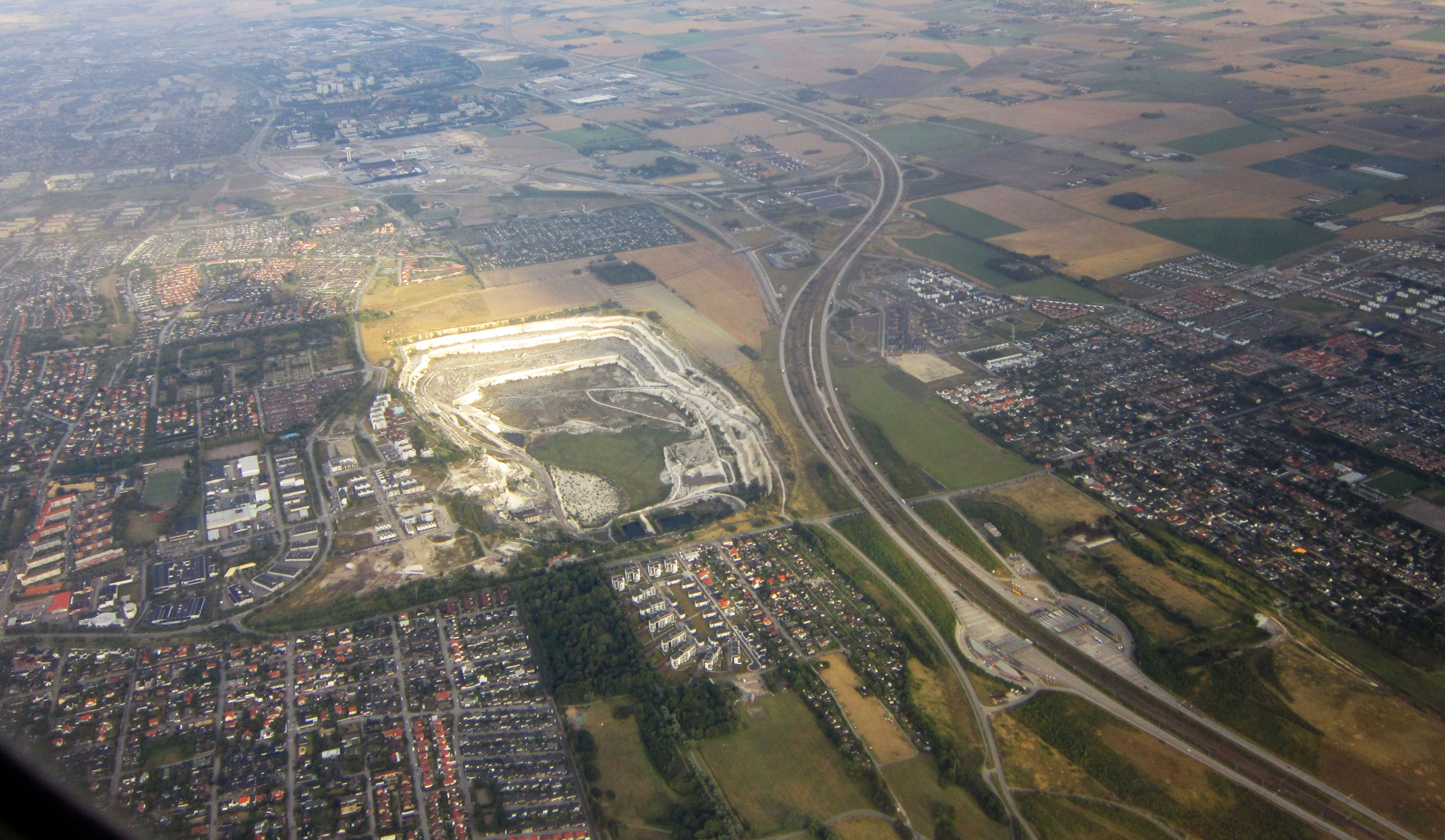
Aerial view
