= Jonathan Asp (born 1990) =

Swedish footballer

Personal information
- Date of birth: 6 May 1990 (age 36)
- Place of birth: Malmö, Sweden
- Height: 1.79 m (5 ft 10 in)
- Position: Left back

Youth career
- IFK Klagshamn

Senior career*
Years	Team	Apps	(Gls)
2008–2015	Trelleborgs FF	112	(7)
2015	FC Höllviken	23	(2)
2016–2017	Åtvidabergs FF	35	(0)
2018	Notodden	30	(0)
2019–2021	Landskrona BoIS	61	(8)

International career
2007	Sweden U17	3	(0)
2010	Sweden U19	2	(0)
2011	Sweden U21	3	(0)
- * Club domestic league appearances and goals as of 6 November 2021

Jonathan Asp (born 6 May 1990) is a Swedish footballer who plays as a left back.
