= Vintrie =

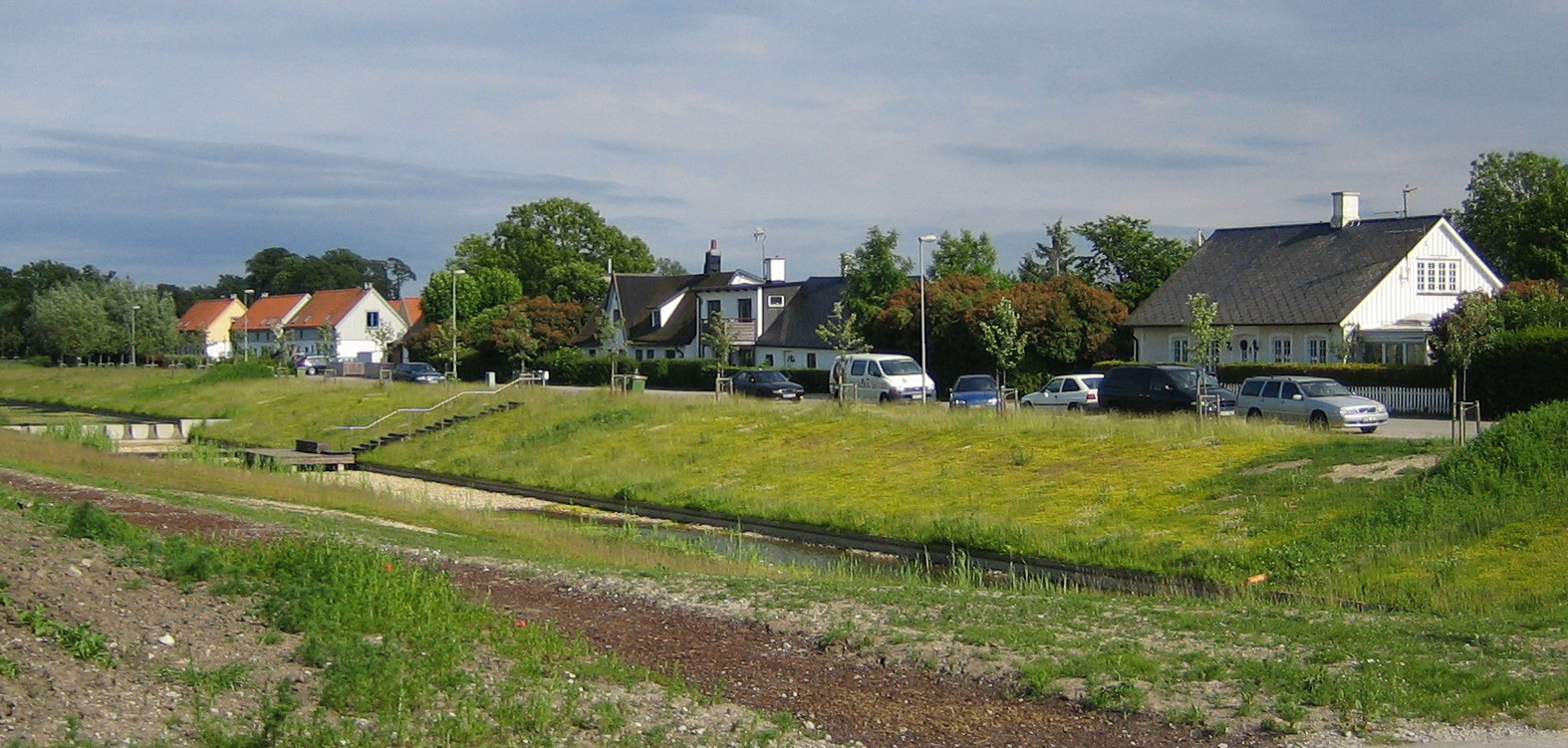

- Location within Skåne Location within Sweden
- Coordinates: 55°33′N 12°58′E
- Country: Sweden
- Province: Skåne
- County: Skåne County
- Municipality: Malmö Municipality

Area
  - Total: 0.30 km^{2} (0.12 sq mi)

Population (31 December 2010)
  - Total: 670
  - Density: 2,253/km^{2} (5,840/sq mi)
- Time zone: UTC+1 (CET)
  - Summer (DST): UTC+2 (CEST)

Vintrie is a locality situated in Malmö Municipality, Skåne County, Sweden with 670 inhabitants in 2010.
