= Tygelsjö =

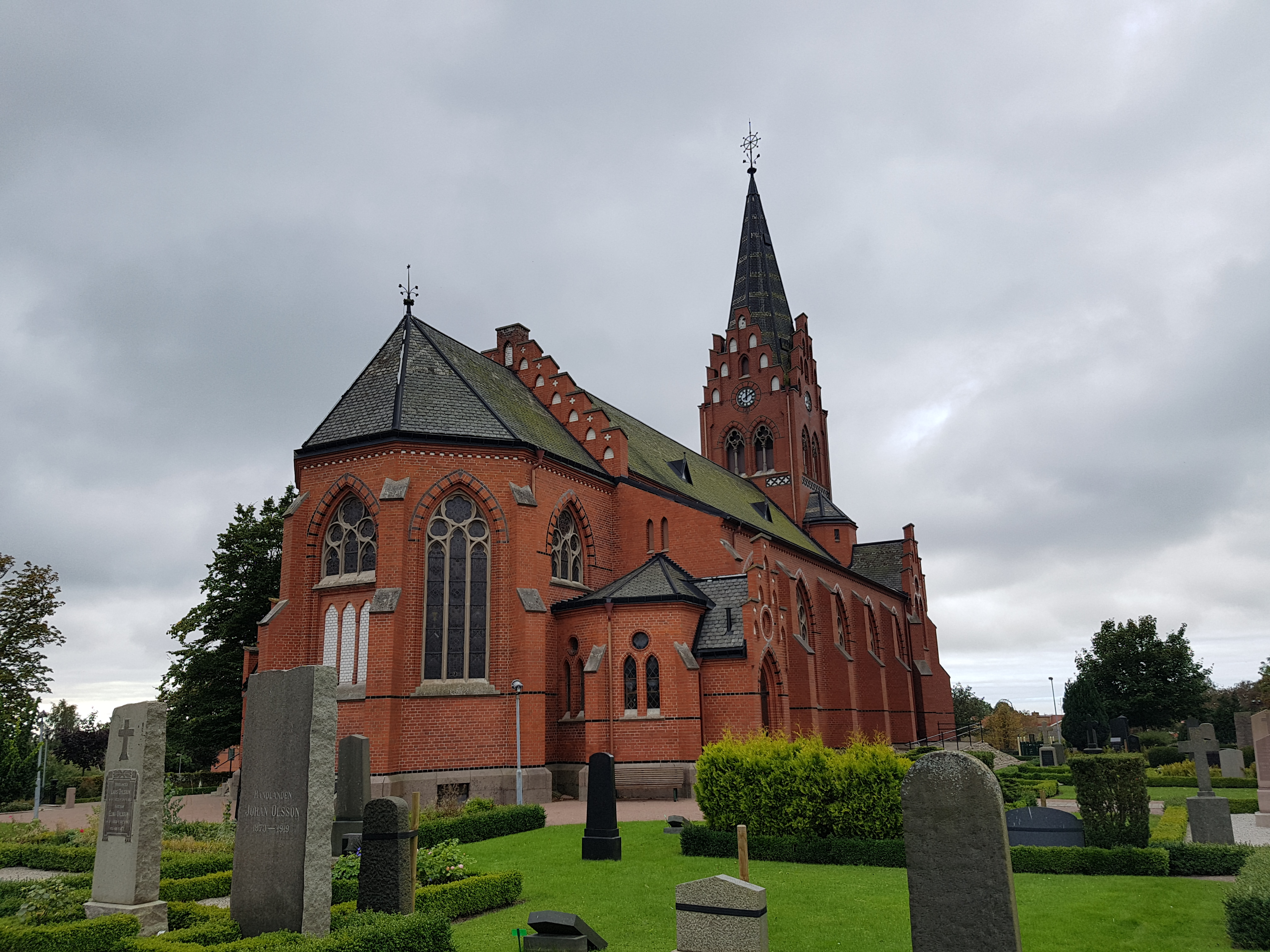
- Tygelsjö church

- Location within Skåne Location within Sweden
- Coordinates: 55°31′N 13°00′E
- Country: Sweden
- Province: Skåne
- County: Skåne County
- Municipality: Malmö Municipality

Area
  - Total: 1.82 km^{2} (0.70 sq mi)

Population (31 December 2018)
  - Total: 3,455
  - Density: 1,898/km^{2} (4,920/sq mi)
- Time zone: UTC+1 (CET)
  - Summer (DST): UTC+2 (CEST)

Tygelsjö is a locality situated in Malmö Municipality, Skåne County, Sweden with 3,455 inhabitants in 2018. It is a suburb to Malmö and lies west of the E22/E6 highway. There are bus routes to Malmö and Vellinge.

== Etymology ==
The oldest mention of Tygelsjö in the form Tyelsse comes from 1393. This can be interpreted as a composition of the word tye (tufty ground) and the word lösa (field). Combined, it means The village by the tufty (field).

== History ==
The ground where Tygelsjö stands today has been farmed since the Stone Age. There have been several archeological sites in the area, especially by the west end of town. The village probably arose sometime during the Viking Age and the area was split up into sockens during the 1200s.
