= Malmö Municipality =

Municipality in Skåne County, Sweden

- Municipality
- Malmö kommun Malmö stad
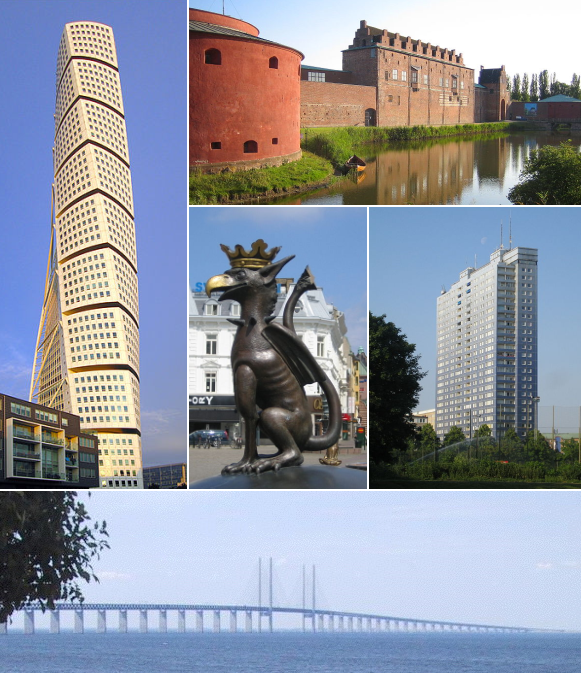

- Coat of arms

- Coordinates: 55°35′N 13°2′E
- Country: Sweden
- County: Skåne
- Seat: Malmö

Government
  - Mayor: Katrin Stjernfeldt Jammeh (S)

Area
  - Total: 332.64 km^{2} (128.43 sq mi)
  - Land: 156.87 km^{2} (60.57 sq mi)
  - Water: 175.77 km^{2} (67.87 sq mi)
- Area as of 1 January 2014.

Population (30 June 2025)
  - Total: 366,803
  - Density: 2,338.3/km^{2} (6,056.1/sq mi)
- Time zone: UTC+1 (CET)
  - Summer (DST): UTC+2 (CEST)
- ISO 3166 code: SE
- Province: Scania
- Municipal code: 1280
- Website: www.malmo.se

Malmö Municipality (Swedish: Malmö kommun), or the City of Malmö (Malmö stad), is a Swedish municipality in Skåne County, the southernmost of the counties of Sweden (and conterminous with the historical province (landskap) of Scania). The central city is Malmö. The municipality is part of Metropolitan Malmö and constitutes its own constituency in parliamentary elections in Sweden.

When the first Swedish local government acts were implemented in 1863, the Old City of Malmö was made one of the country's 88 city municipalities and the first city council was elected. The municipal territory has been augmented through mergers in 1911, 1915, 1931, 1935, 1952, 1967 and finally in 1971.

The landscape of the municipality is one of Sweden's most urbanized. For a long time, the municipality was one of Sweden's most important industrial municipalities, but this era is over. Major sectors are instead trade and business services, but above all the public sector.

After the formation of the municipality in 1971, the population was declining, but the trend reversed in the early 2000s and has continued to rise since then. The municipality is a stronghold of the Social Democrats, who have been in power since 1994.

== Administrative history ==
The municipal area corresponds to the parishes of Bunkeflo, Fosie, Glostorp, Husie, Hyllie, Lockarp, Oxie, Södra Sallerurp, Tygelsjö, Västra Klagstorp and Västra Skrävlinge. In these parishes, rural municipalities with corresponding names were formed during the 1862 municipal reform. The area also included the city of Malmö, which formed a city municipality in 1863.

Limhamn's municipal community was established on June 7, 1901 and was dissolved in 1906 when Limhamn's borough was formed from Hyllie county municipality and part of Fosie county municipality. The borough became part of the City of Malmö in 1915. Sofielund municipal community was established on February 21, 1896 in Västra Skrävlinge county municipality which in 1911 became part of the City of Malmö. Fosie municipal community was established on May 30, 1919 and was dissolved in 1931 when Fosie county municipality became part of the City of Malmö. In 1935 Husie county municipality was incorporated into the City of Malmö.

== Geography ==
The municipality is located in the southwestern part of the province of Skåne with the Öresund in the west. Malmö municipality borders Burlöv municipality and Staffanstorp municipality to the north, Svedala municipality to the east and Vellinge municipality to the south. The municipality has a sea border in the north with Kävlinge municipality and Lomma municipality. On the other side of Öresund, Malmö Municipality borders Dragør Municipality, Tårnby Municipality and Copenhagen Municipality in the Capital Region of Denmark on the island of Zealand, to which it is connected by the Öresund Bridge.

=== Topography and hydrography ===
The municipal area is one of Sweden's most urbanized landscapes. There is not much left of the original wet meadows south of the town. These have been shaped by being used as grazing land for centuries. The coast has changed significantly since the beginning of the 20th century with the filling of the limestone quarry in Klagshamn. Today it is a peninsula with rich flora and fauna. The beach between the white overburden of the waste mountain Lernacken and the landfill Spillepengen in the north is entirely urban, with the exception of smaller areas used for recreation, swimming and boating, and hiking areas. At Oxie there is a more undulating landscape where sorted sediments form hills which are partly covered with cultivated clay and fertile moraine.

=== Nature conservation ===
In 2022 there were three nature reserves in Malmö municipality - Bunkeflo strandängar, Foteviksområdet and Limhamns kalkbrott (Limhamn limestone quarry).

The municipality's first nature reserve, Bunkeflo Strandängar, was established in 2006 and is a reserve managed by the municipality. This includes 300 different plants including some unique and rare species such as Iris spuria (blue flag), Odontites litoralis and Artemisia maritima (sea wormwood). The next reserve, Limhamns kalkbrott, was established in 2010 and is also managed by Malmö municipality. Access to the area, which is home to 2000 different species, requires a guide.

The Fotevik area was created in 2011 and is also classified as a Natura 2000 site. The area is the most important Swedish site for the very rare subspecies of Dunlin, Calidris alpina schinzii. In addition, the rare amphibians European green toad and Natterjack toad are found. The rare moth Morris's wainscot (Chortodes morrisii) can be found in areas with reeds.

=== Administrative subdivision ===
From 2016, the municipality is divided into 19 districts:

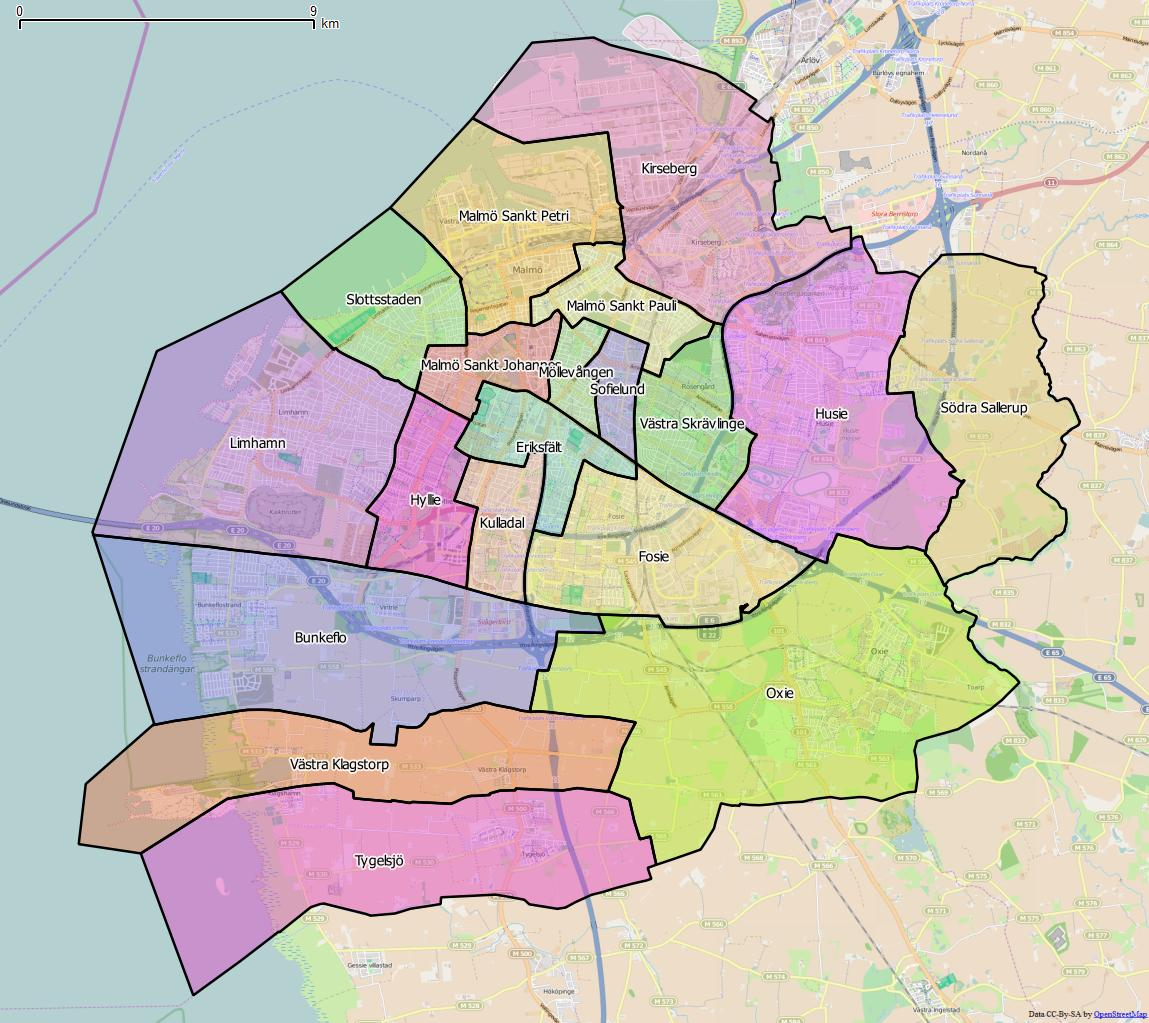
Districts of Malmö municipality

Bunkeflo	Limhamn	Slottsstaden
Eriksfält	Malmö Sankt Johannes	Sofielund
Fosie	Malmö Sankt Pauli	Södra Sallerup
Husie	Malmö Sankt Petri	Tygelsjö
Hyllie	Möllevången	Västra Klagstorp
Kirseberg	Oxie	Västra Skrävlinge
Kulladal		

=== Localities ===
As of 2015, there were six urban areas (tätort or locality) and six smaller settlements (småorter) in the municipality.

The localities are listed in the table according to the size of the population in 2018. Note that a small part of Malmö (Arlöv) is situated in Burlöv Municipality.

#	Locality	Population
1	Malmö	316,588
2	Bunkeflostrand	13,561
3	Oxie	13,165
4	Tygelsjö	3,455
5	Vintrie	803
6	Skumparp	253

== Governance and politics ==
The municipality of Malmö has traditionally been governed by the Social Democrats since the introduction of universal suffrage in 1919, with the exception of two terms in 1985-1988 (the 1985 municipal elections broke a 66-year Social Democratic hold on power) and 1991-1994 when bourgeois coalitions ruled.

The municipal legislative body of the municipality is the 61-member municipal assembly (kommunfullmäktige), elected by proportional representation for a four-year term. The assembly appoints the municipality's main governing bodies, the 11-member executive committee (kommunstyrelsen) and the 8 governing commissioners. The executive committee and the commissioners are headed by a municipal commissioner (kommunstyrelsens ordförande) or "mayor". The mayor is Katrin Stjernfeldt Jammeh of the Social Democratic Party.

There are eight political parties represented in the council elected in 2026: Social Democratic Party (19 seats), Moderate Party (12), Left Party (11), Sweden Democrats (7), Green Party (5), Centre Party (3), Liberals (2), and the Malmö List (2).

Year	Parties			
1971–1985	S			
1985–1988	M	FP	SKÅ	C
1988–1991	S			
1991–1994	M	FP	SKÅ	
1994–1998	S			
1998–2010	S	V	MP	
2010–2015	S	MP	V	
2015–2018	S	MP		
2018–2022	S	L		
2022–2026	S	MP	L	
2026–	S	MP	V	

== Twin towns – sister cities ==
Malmö is twinned with:

- Port Adelaide Enfield, Australia (1988)
- Stralsund, Germany (1991)
- Szczecin, Poland (1990)
- Tallinn, Estonia (1989)
- Tangshan, China (1987)
- Vaasa, Finland (1940)
- Varna, Bulgaria (1987)

In addition to its twin towns, Malmö also co-operates with the Province of Chieti in Italy and with Newcastle upon Tyne in the United Kingdom.

== See also ==
- Metropolitan Malmö
- sv:Lista över Sveriges distrikt (List of all Swedish districts)
