= Million Programme =

Swedish housing programme

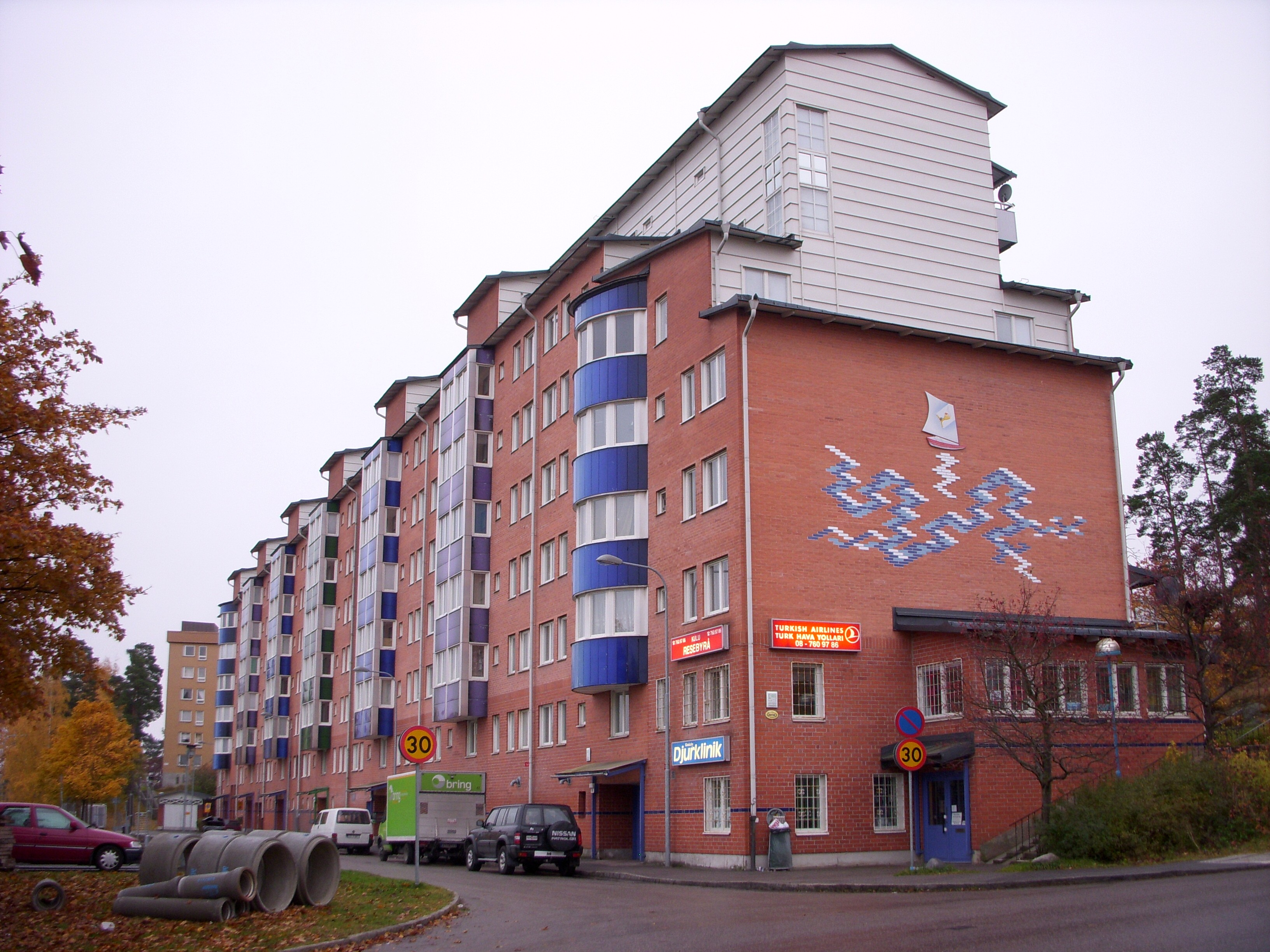
Refurbished Million Programme homes in Rinkeby (2009)

The Million Programme (Swedish: Miljonprogrammet) was a large public housing programme implemented in Sweden between 1965 and 1974 by the governing Swedish Social Democratic Party to ensure the availability of affordable, high-quality housing to all Swedish citizens. The programme sought to construct one million new housing dwellings over a ten-year period, which it accomplished. (Note: The programm also demolished many older buildings, so the net increase in the housing stock was not one million but roughly 650,000.) As part of its intention to modernise Swedish housing, it also demolished many older buildings that national and local governments considered obsolescent, unhealthy or derelict.

At the time, the intention to build one million new homes in a nation with a population of eight million made the Million Programme the most ambitious building programme in the world. In contrast to the social housing proposals of many other developed countries, which is targeted at those with low incomes, the Million Programme was a universal programme intended to provide housing to Swedish people at a variety of income levels. (Note: A defining feature of the Swedish welfare state has long been its emphasis on universalism. However, beginning in the last decades of the 20th century Swedish housing policy shifted its focus more towards support to low-income households and depressed neighbourhoods.)

== Background ==
The housing shortage in Sweden before the start of the programme was a major political and social issue in Sweden. Between 1860 and 1960, Sweden had transformed from an agrarian nation to a highly industrialised nation, which led to a large urbanisation trend. The population in the countryside moved in large numbers to towns and cities after 1945. This urbanisation following World War II was also encouraged by the authorities and governing establishment. After the war, as Swedish industry was unharmed, cities needed workers to produce the amount of goods demanded by the rest of war-destroyed Europe. The major cities of Sweden in many cases had their last building boom in the late-19th century and were, by 1950, much too small to accommodate the rural population then flooding into the cities.

The increasing standard of living led to demands to dramatically decrease the population density and to abolish the old Lort-Sverige (Dirt Sweden). This was made possible because of the outstanding growth Sweden had during the record years (rekordåren) in the 1950s and 1960s which led to a flood of income to the national treasury. This money was used to implement social reforms. The social democratic government implemented reforms to ensure the availability of land, such as new land seizure rules for local authorities, as long as the landowner was planning to sell it to a private buyer. Another new law said that a municipality could build homes outside its border ("Lex Bollmora"), because rural municipalities near Stockholm could not afford to build so much.

== Programme ==
Over the lifespan of the programme, 1,006,000 new dwellings were built. For the houses designed for the lowest-income group, the government would bear 66% of the initial costs and this would be repaid by the customers and residents in a 30-year period. For other categories such as students, blue collar workers, and immigrants, the government provided subsidies and incentives to building companies in order to start construction. The net result was an increase in Sweden’s housing stock of 650,000 new apartments and houses, financed through property taxes, with a general rise in housing quality.

== Design ==
The new Million Programme residential areas were greatly inspired by early suburban neighbourhoods such as Vällingby and Årsta. One of the main aims behind the planning of these residential areas was to create "good democratic citizens". The means of achieving this were to build at high quality with a good range of services including schools, nurseries, churches, public spaces, libraries, and meeting places for different groups of households. A principal aim was to mix and integrate different groups of households through the spatial mixing of tenures. Most of the apartments were of the "standard three room apartment" (two bedroom apartment) type (Swedish: normaltrea) of 75 m² (810 sq ft), planned for a model family of two adults and two children. The second type of apartments were the "student blocks" or "student suburbs" that were planned and built in the cities having large universities, like Stockholm, Lund, Uppsala, Linköping and Umeå. Almost 150,000 new "student apartments" were built in specially designated "student suburbs" in order to meet the needs of the rapidly increasing university student population. These student apartments were usually 1-bedroom 1-bathroom and common kitchen type dorms that were clustered together in a large suburb or neighbourhood. The ownership of the apartments were leased out to "housing companies" like Heimstaden AB who rented it out at below market rates, the rents being subsidised by the government.

The Million Programme is sometimes equated with the construction of concentrated tower blocks. However, these areas constituted about one third of the programme's apartments. Areas with lower apartment blocks and areas with one-family houses made up about the remaining two thirds of the number of total units.

== Criticism ==
Many of Sweden's so-called vulnerable areas were constructed during the Million Programme. By the end of 2023, there were 59 such areas in Sweden, with the vast majority overlapping with the Million Programme. The programme has also been criticised for architecturally dull buildings.

== Photos ==
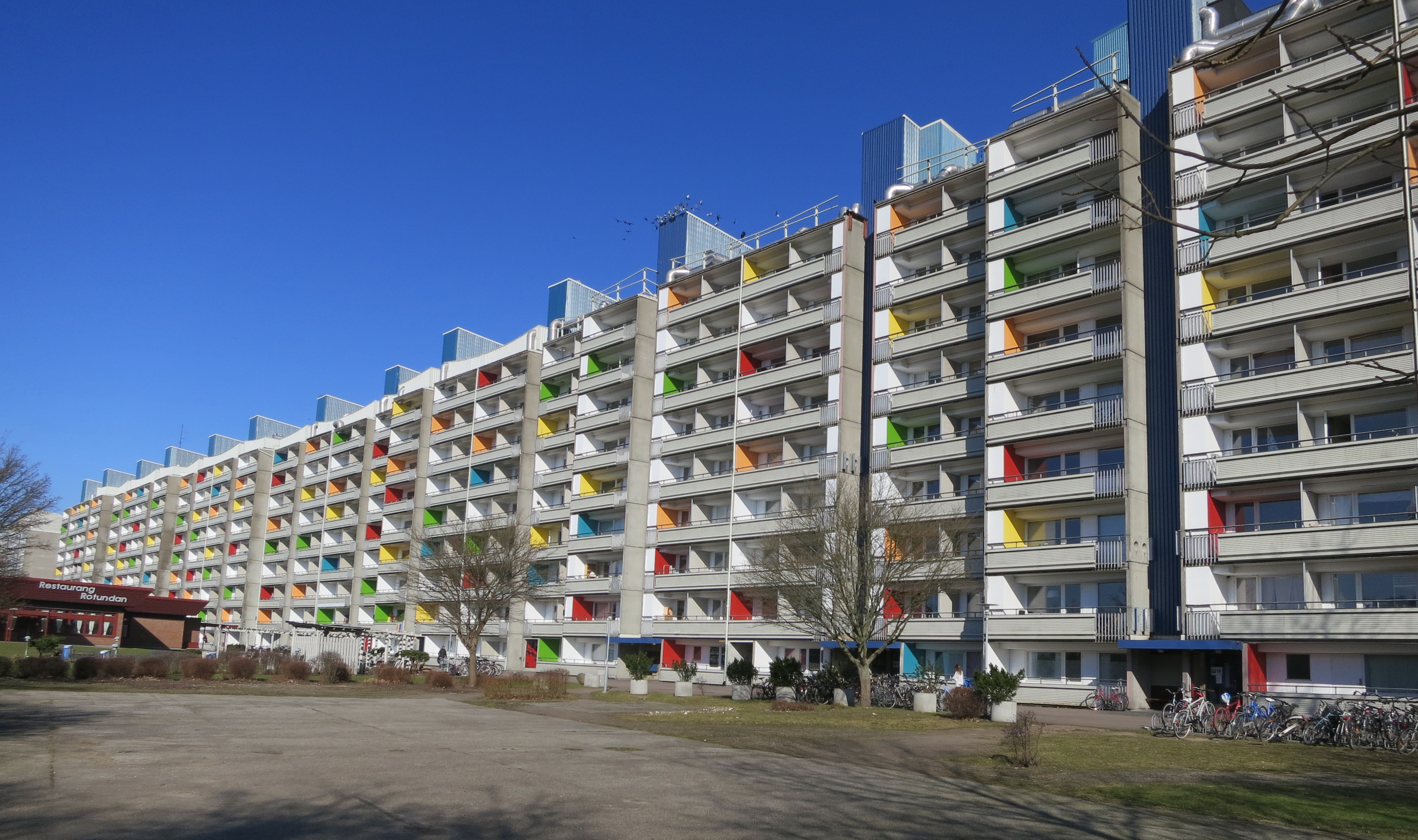
Rosengård in Malmö

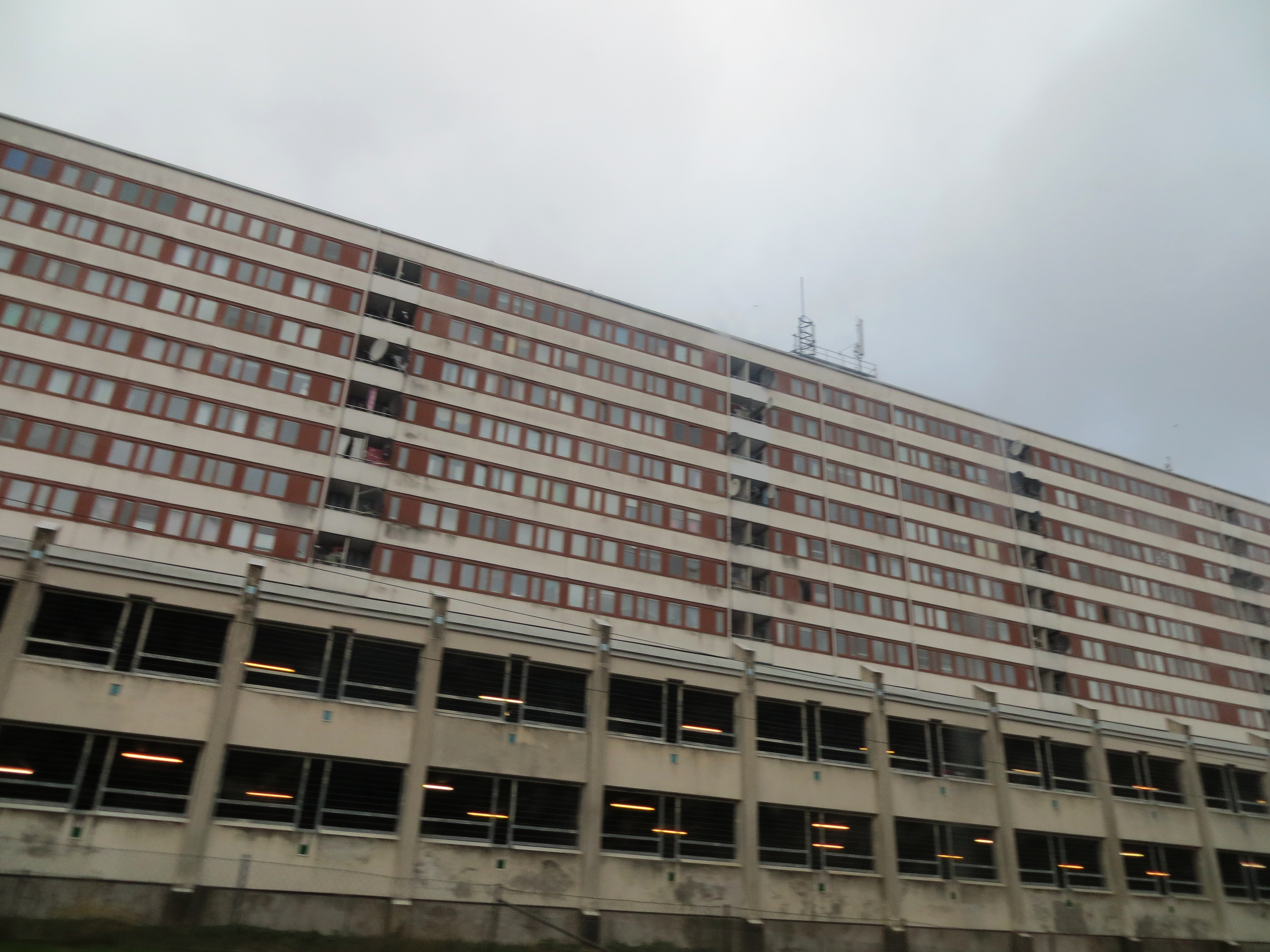
Biskopsgården in Gothenburg

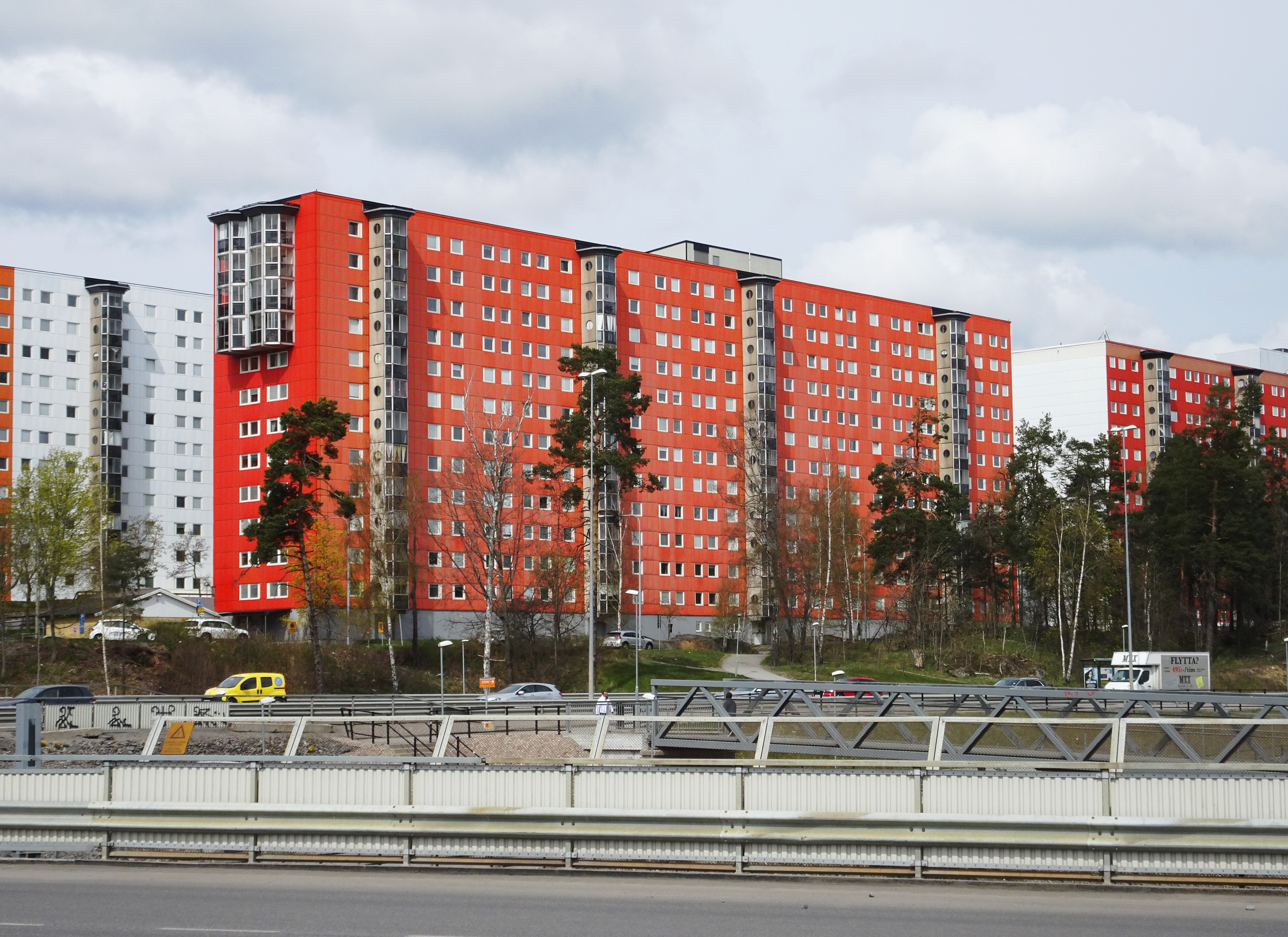
Flemingsberg in Stockholm

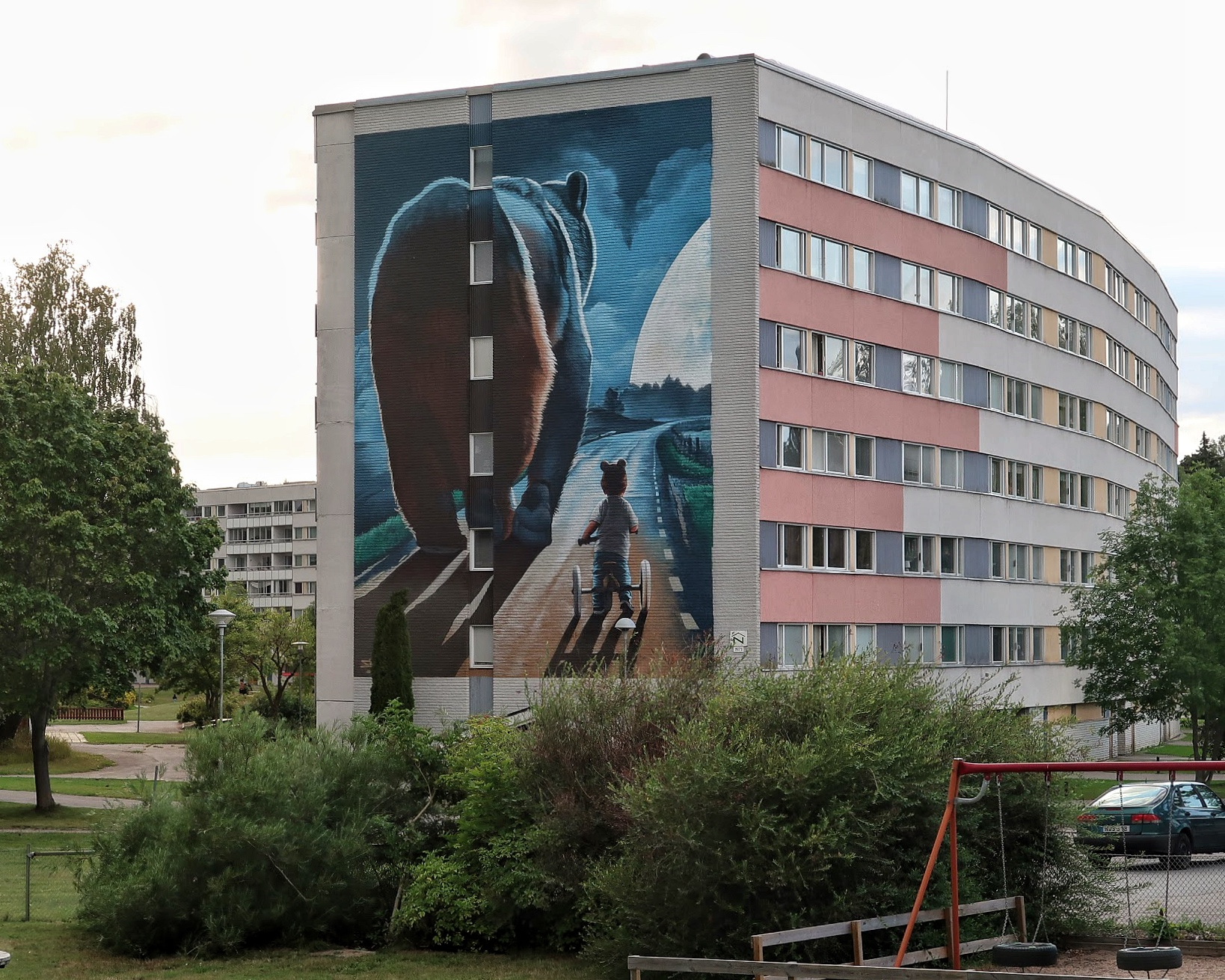
Brandkärr in Nyköping

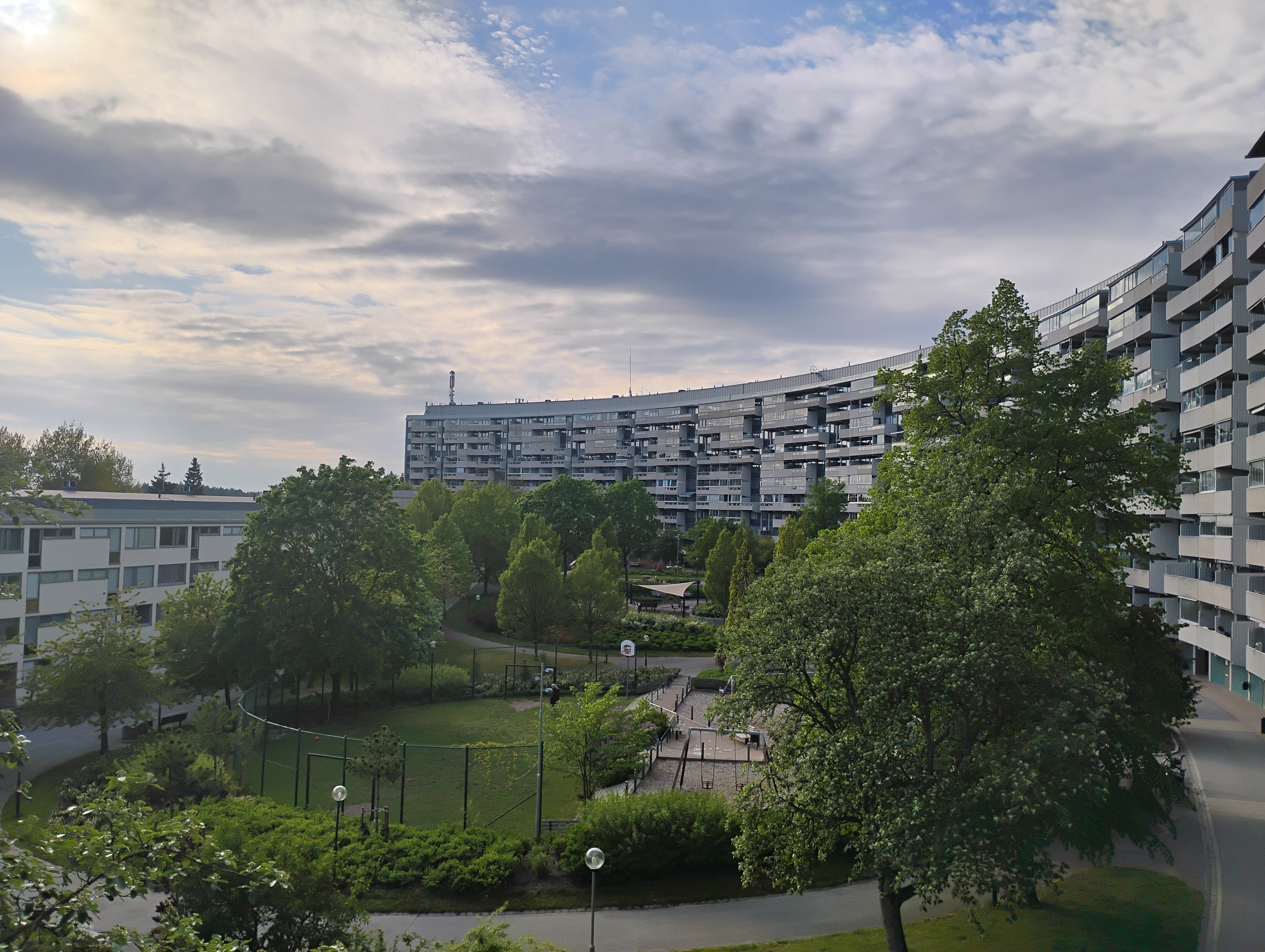
Täby in Stockholm

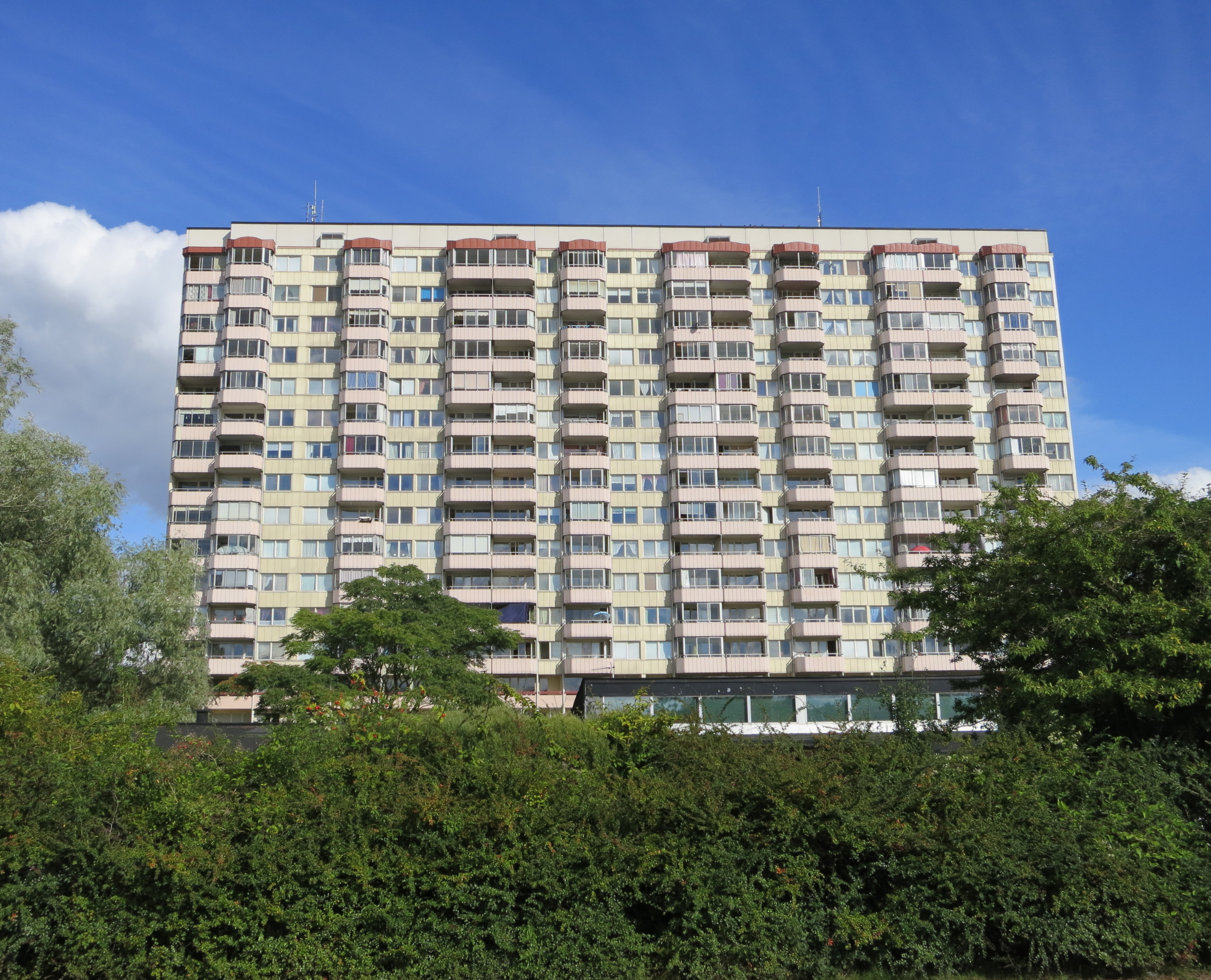
Lindängen in Malmö

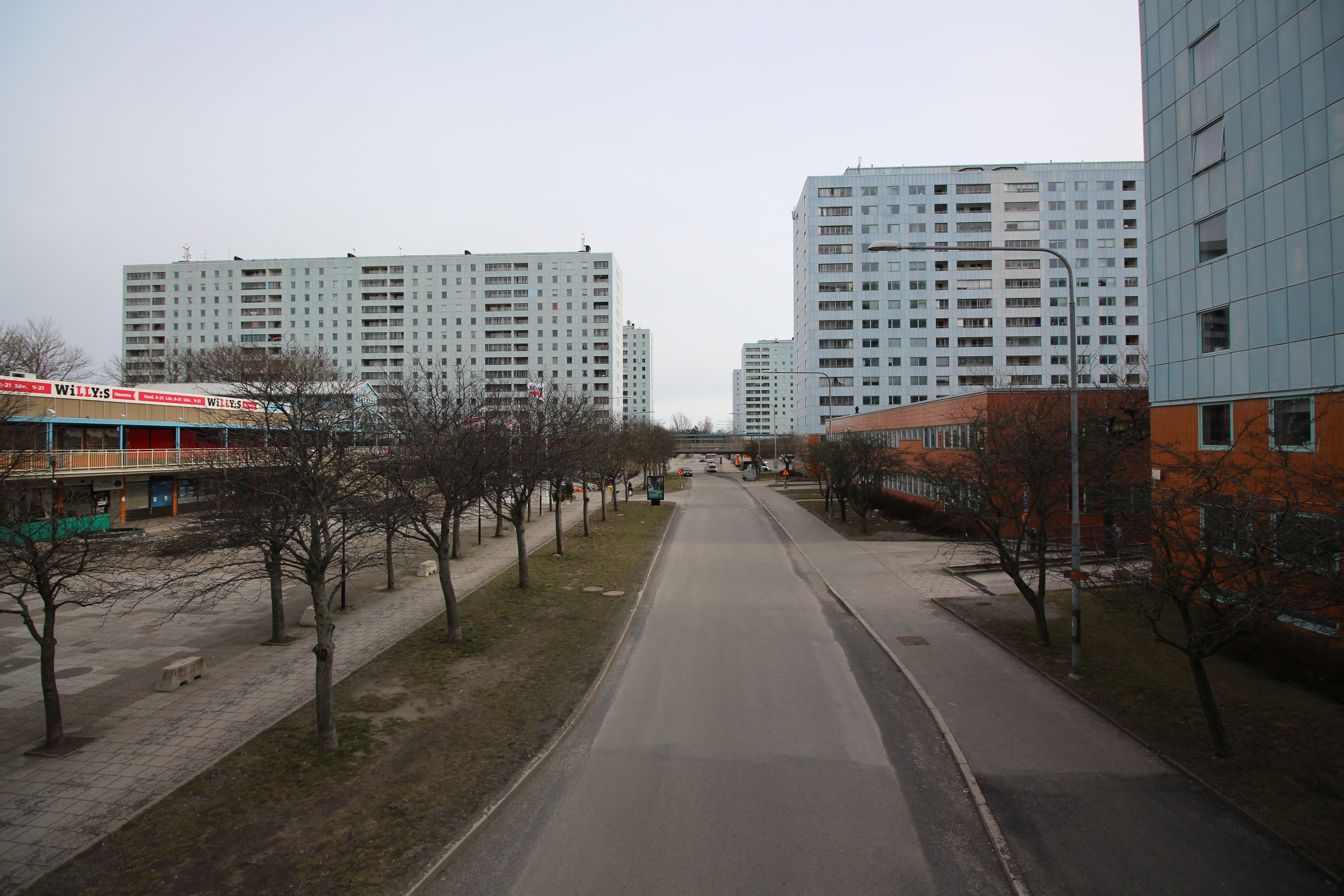
Hagalund in Stockholm

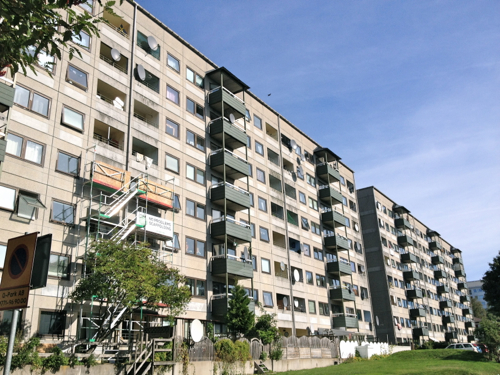
Hammarkullen in Gothenburg

== Districts ==
Some Million Programme districts:

- Rinkeby, Tensta and Husby in Stockholm Municipality
- Bredäng, Skärholmen and Vårberg in Stockholm Municipality
- Bagarmossen in Skarpnäck in Stockholm Municipality
- Bollmora in Tyresö (Stockholm).
- Fisksätra in Nacka (Stockholm).
- Vårby gård, Masmo, Alby, Fittja and Hallunda in Huddinge Municipality and Botkyrka Municipality outside Stockholm
- Jordbro and Brandbergen in Haninge Municipality outside Stockholm
- Hallonbergen in Sundbyberg Municipality
- Hagalund in Solna Municipality
- Malmvägen in Sollentuna Municipality
- Hovsjö, Ronna, Geneta and Fornhöjden in Södertälje Municipality
- Hjällbo, Hammarkullen and several others in Angered in Gothenburg Municipality
- Bergsjön in Gothenburg Municipality
- Hisings-Backa and Kärra in Gothenburg
- Rosengård, Hermodsdal, Kroksbäck, Bellevuegården, Lorensborg, Lindängen, Höja, Lindeborg and Holma in Malmö
- Komarken in Kungälv
- Kronogården in Trollhättan
- Kronoparken in Karlstad
- Ryd, Johannelund, Ekholmen, Berga, and Skäggetorp in Linköping
- Gottsunda, Flogsta and Eriksberg in Uppsala
- Hertsön in Luleå
- Araby in Växjö
- Ålidhem and Mariehem in Umeå
- Årby in Eskilstuna
- Hässleholmen and Norrby in Borås
- Råslätt in Jönköping
- Ryd, Skövde in Skövde
- Hageby and Navestad in Norrköping
- Ekön in Motala
- Norrliden in Kalmar
- Linero, Norra Fäladen and Klostergården in Lund
- Korsbacka in Kävlinge
- Skogslyckan and Dalaberg in Uddevalla
- Rosta in Örebro
- Andersberg and Sätra in Gävle
- Körfältet in Östersund
- Kungshall in Nybro
- Drottninghög, Fredriksdal and Dalhem (Belgium) in Helsingborg
- Nacksta in Sundsvall
- Tjärna Ängar in Borlänge

== See also ==
- Urbanism
- Large-panel-system building (Germany)
- Panelház (Hungary)
- Panelák and Sídlisko (Czech Republic and Slovakia)
- Khrushchevka (Former Soviet Union)
- Gemeindebau (Austria)
- Housing estate
- Public housing
- Subsidised housing
- Subsidised housing in the United States
- Section 8 (USA)
- Affordable housing
- Social welfare
- Welfare state
- Tower block
- Vulnerable area
