= Hyllie =

- Former city district
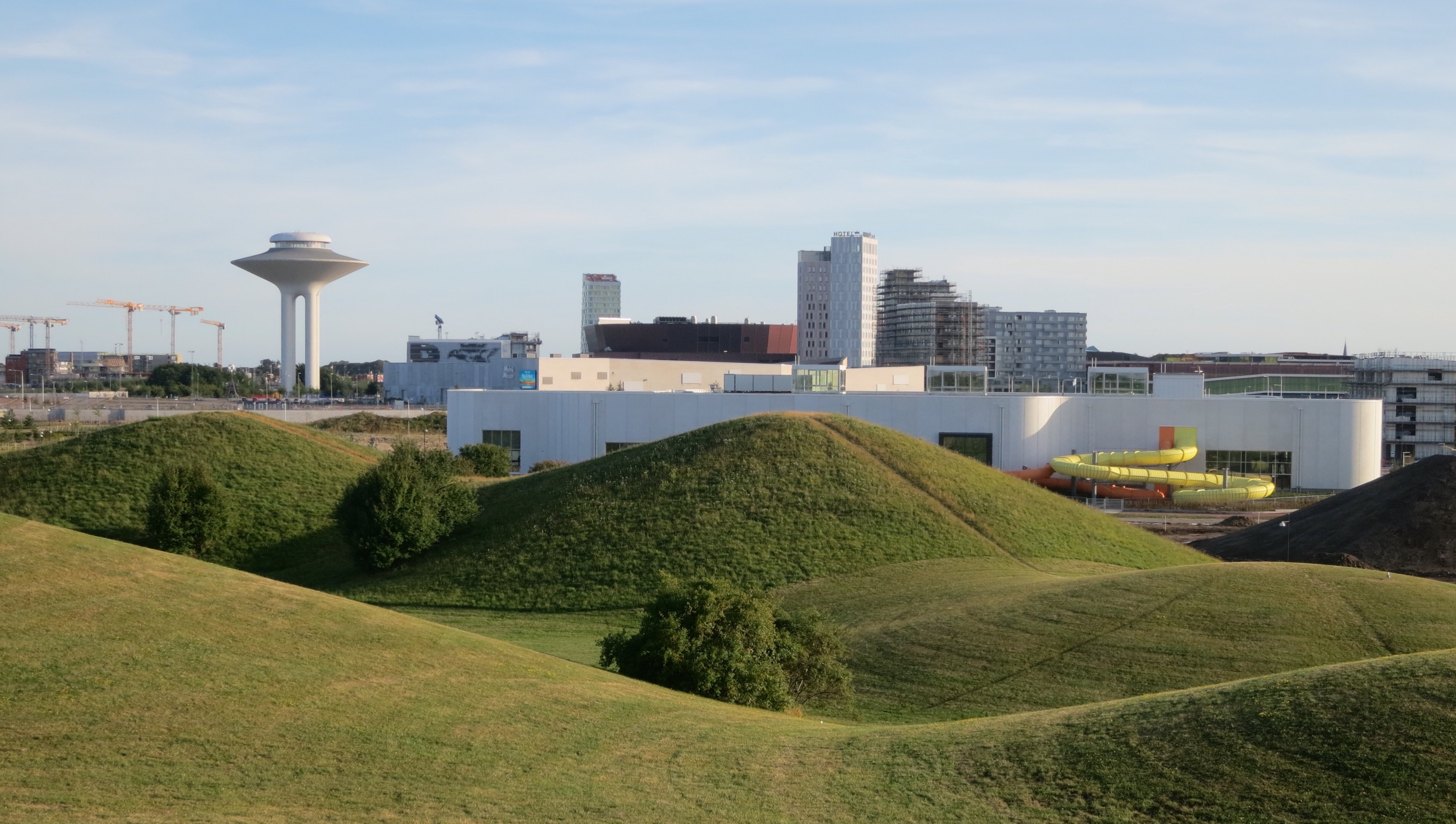
- View, including Hyllie Water Tower and Hylliebadet.

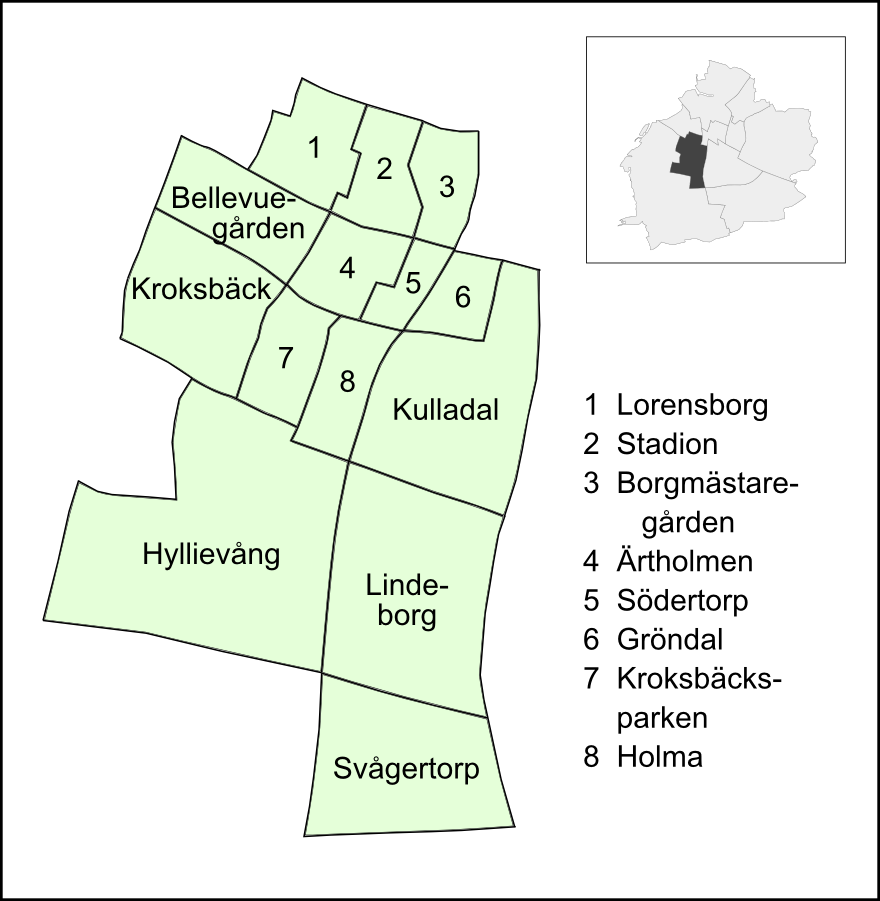
- Hyllie's neighbourhoods
- Country: Sweden
- Province: Scania
- County: Skåne County
- Municipality: Malmö Municipality

Area
  - Total: 901 ha (2,230 acres)

Population (2012)
  - Total: 32,998
  - Density: 3,660/km^{2} (9,490/sq mi)
- Time zone: UTC+01:00 (CET)
  - Summer (DST): UTC+02:00 (CEST)

Hyllie (Swedish pronunciation: [ˈhʏ̂lːɪɛ]) is an area and former city district (Swedish: stadsdel) in the central of Malmö Municipality, Sweden. On 1 July 2013, it was merged with Limhamn-Bunkeflo, forming Väster.

In 2012, Hyllie had a population of 32,998 of the municipality's 307,758. The area was 901 hectares.

Though the name of the district has changed the area is still referred to as Hyllie. It is one of Sweden's most dynamic districts thanks to its location halfway between Malmö Central and Copenhagen Airport. The Eurovision Song Contest was staged in the Malmö Arena in 2013 and in 2024 as well. It is the second-largest arena in Sweden.

== Neighbourhoods ==
The neighbourhoods of Hyllie were:

- Ärtholmen
- Bellevuegården
- Borgmästaregården
- Gröndal
- Holma
- Hyllievång
- Kroksbäck
- Kroksbäcksparken
- Kulladal
- Lindeborg
- Lorensborg
- Stadionområdet (area)
- Svågertorp
- Södertorp

== Notable residents ==
- Jonathan Conricus (born 1979), Swedish-Israeli IDF Lieutenant-Colonel (ret), IDF International Spokesperson
- Anthony Elanga (born 2002), footballer for Newcastle United, son of Cameroonian footballer Joseph Elanga
- Jakob Eriksson (1848–1931), plant pathologist, mycologist, and taxonomist
- Kilian Zoll (1818–1860), painter, graphic artist, and illustrator
