= Gröndal (disambiguation) =

Gröndal may refer to:

== Places ==
- Gröndal, a district of Stockholm
  - Gröndals IK, a football team
  - Gröndalsbron, two bridges in central Stockholm
- Gröndal, Malmö, a district of Malmö
- Gröndal, the official Swedish name of Viherlaakso district, Espoo, Finland

== People ==
- Ragnheiður Gröndal (born 1984), Icelandic singer
- Benedikt Sigurðsson Gröndal (1924–2010), former Prime Minister of Iceland
- Benedikt Sveinbjarnarson Gröndal (1826–1907), Icelandic illustrator and poet
- Þorvaldur Gröndal, drummer for Apparat Organ Quartet

== See also ==
- Grøndal station, Copenhagen
- Anders Grøndal (born 1984), Norwegian rally and hill climb driver
- Grønnedal or Gronnedal or Grondal, former names of Kangilinnguit, Greenland
