= Ålidhem =

- Residential area
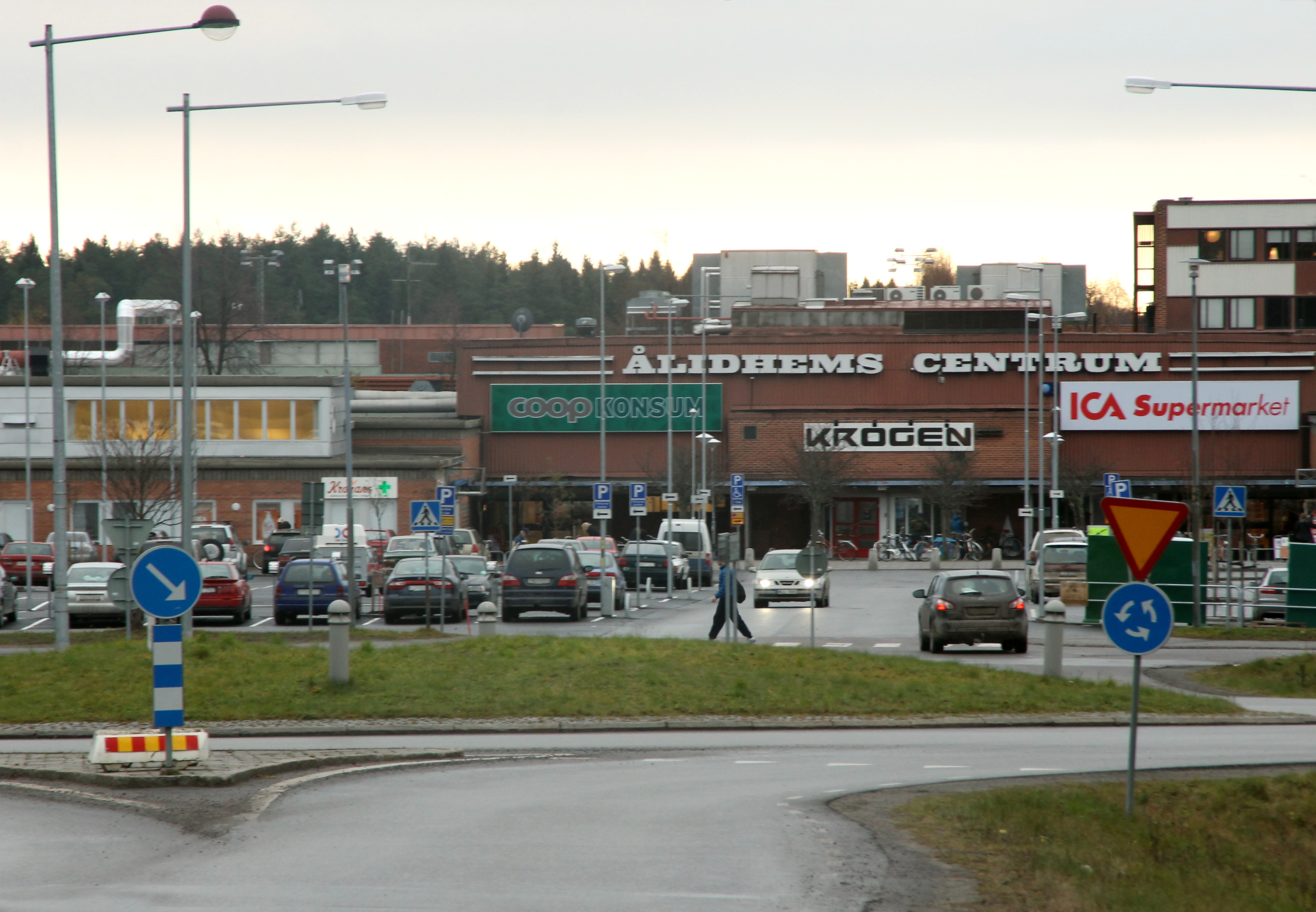
- central Ålidhem

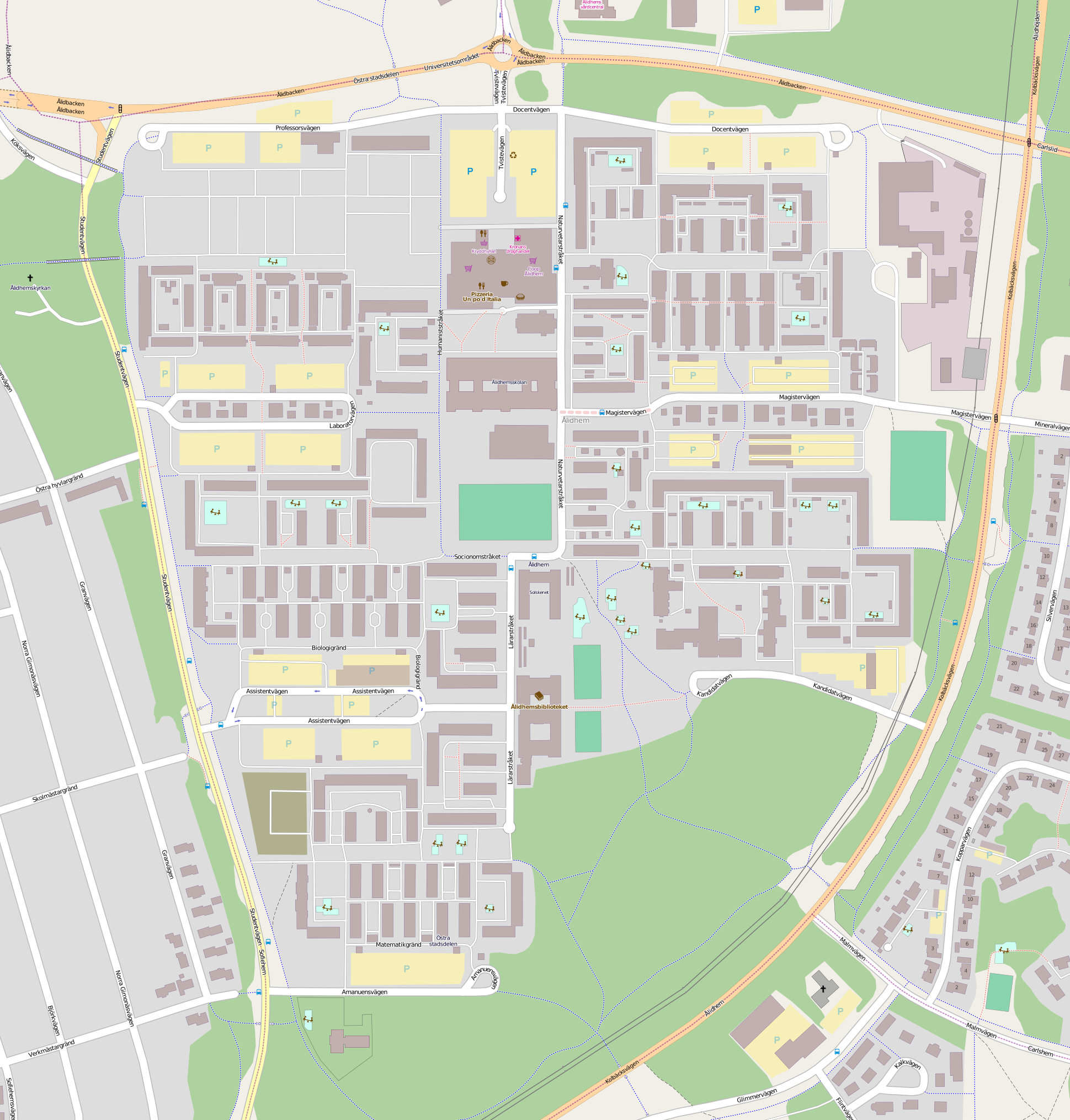
- Map of Ålidhem, from OpenStreetMap
- Coordinates: 63°48′35″N 20°18′55″E
- Country: Sweden
- Province: Västerbotten
- County: Västerbotten County
- Municipality: Umeå Municipality
- Time zone: UTC+1 (CET)
  - Summer (DST): UTC+2 (CEST)

Ålidhem is a residential area in Umeå, Sweden. About 9,000 people live in Ålidhem, which is located about 3 km outside the city centre. It was built between 1966 and 1973 as a part of the Million Programme and, because of the proximity to the Umeå University campus, many of the buildings are student residences.

== Image gallery ==
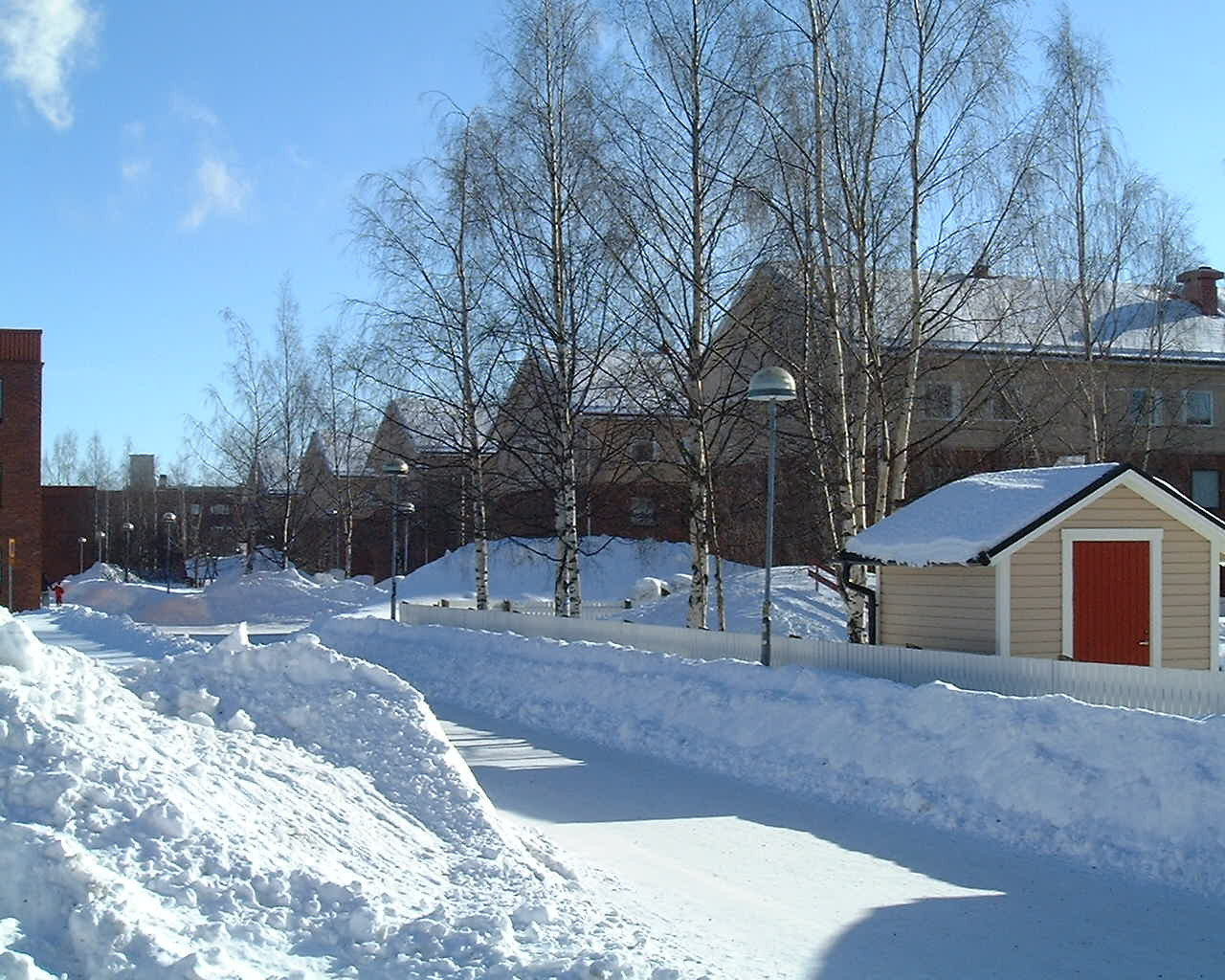
Historiegränd (Swedish: "History Alley") in Ålidhem

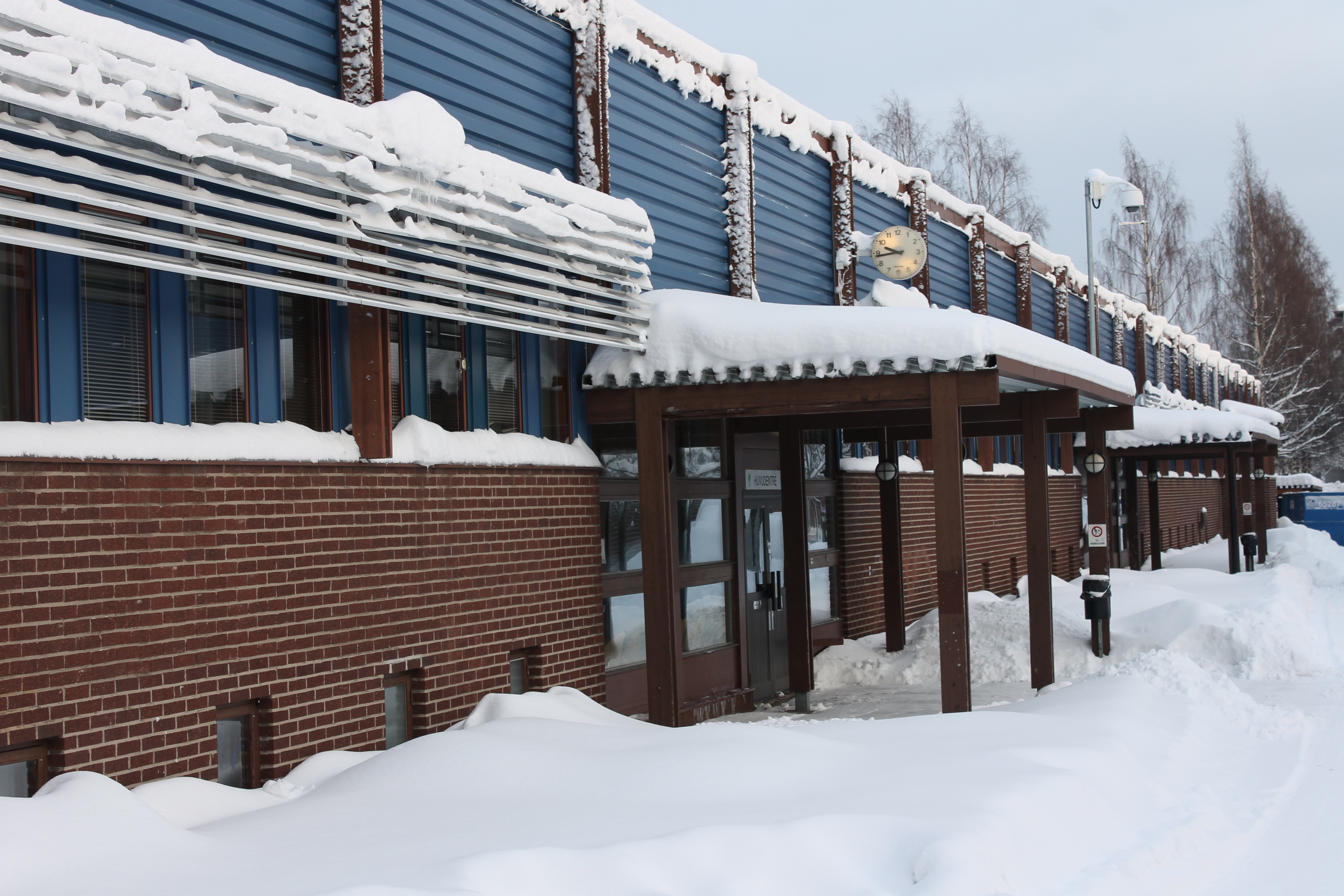
School

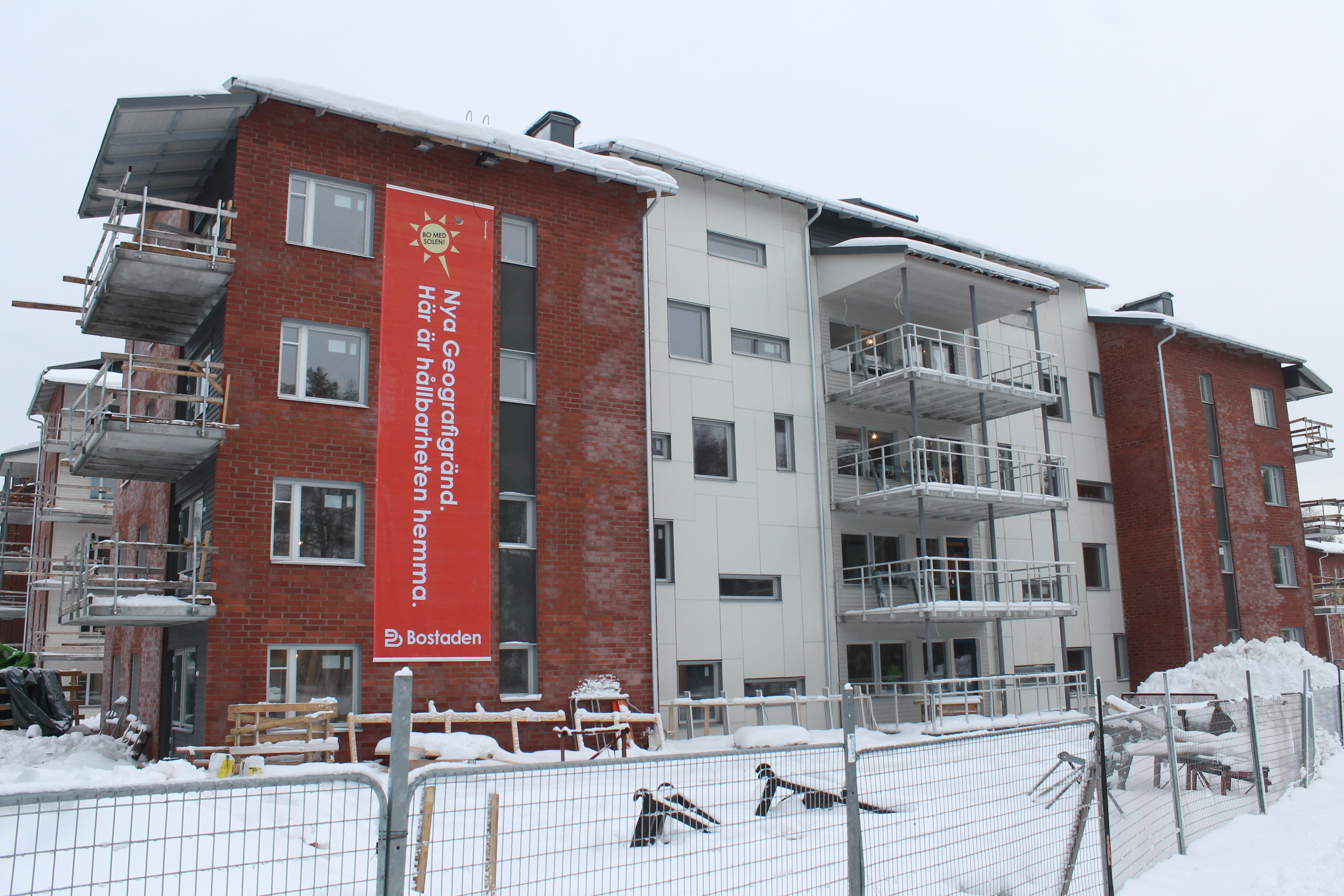
Apartment building on 2 Geografigränd, under construction
