= Årby =

Housing development in Eskilstuna, Sweden

Coordinates: 59°22′55″N 16°31′14″E

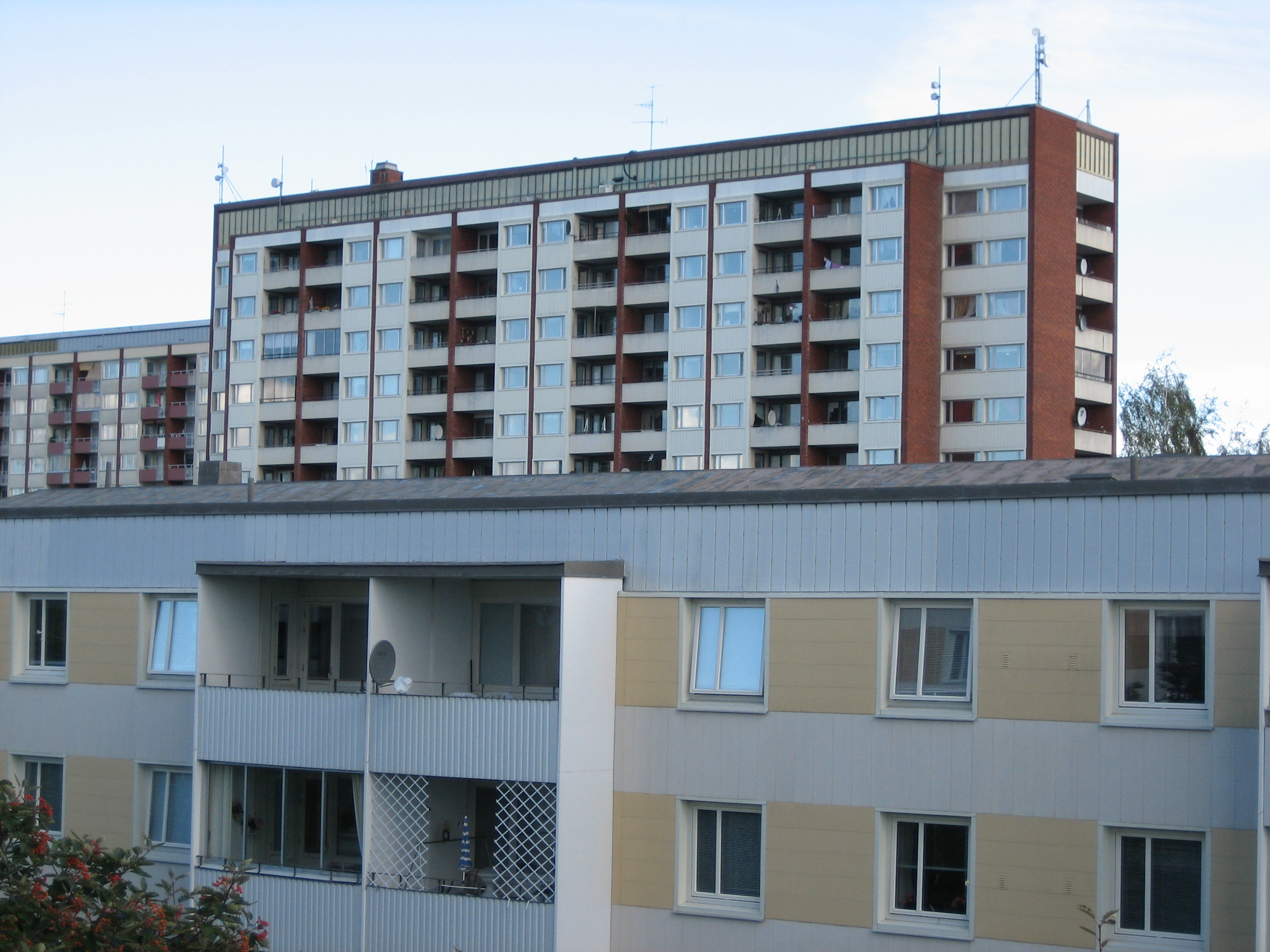
Årby at daylight. The smaller three-store building in the foreground, the larger building in the background.

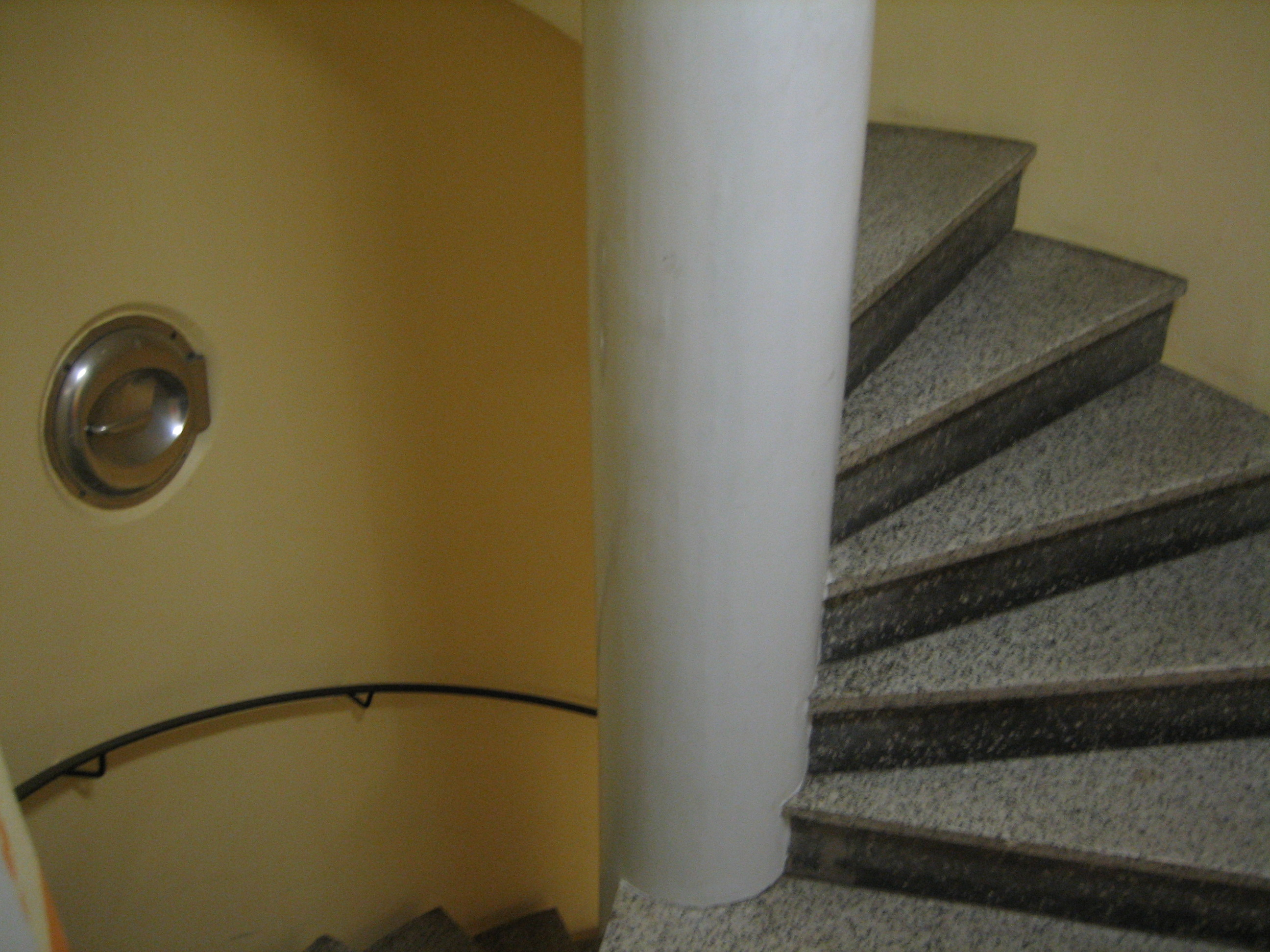
Typical Stairway in Årby.

Årby or Årby housing projects is one of the public housing and private owned developments in Eskilstuna, Sweden. The housing opened in the 1960s as a result of the Million Programme by the Swedish government.

== Location ==
Årby is located in the northern parts of Eskilstuna, near the European route E20 and the main road to downtown Eskilstuna. Along Årby runs the Torshällavägen, which leads to the small town of Torshälla. The area can be reached by car or by busline 1 and 2.

== Buildings ==
Årby consists of 29 apartment buildings of various sizes. Most of the buildings are either 7 or 11 floors with a smaller 3-floor building attached to the bigger building. Most of the inhabitants have a different language than Swedish as their mother tongue. The apartments are in various sizes, from two rooms and kitchen up to five rooms and a kitchen.

== Årbyskolan ==
Close to the area is the neighborhood school, Årbyskolan. The school has about 600 students from kindergarten up to middle school.

== Green areas ==
Årby have many large grass areas and meadows spread around the projects. Further north, crossing the European route E20 lies Årbyskogen (Swedish: skogen English: woods). The woods are inhabited by the local Special school and Friluftsfrämjandet. There are also several exercise tracks that go along the tight vegetation.

== Music ==
Since the large population of non-natives, the cultural influence on the area is very large. The yearly Årbyfestivalen is held every summer and gives the people music from all different cultures. Recently, the hip hop music style has been successful in the housing area. Individuals and groups like Årby berättar do their own music (often in the studio of Årbyskolan) and tell about their lives and stories about Årby.

== Sources ==
- http://eskilstuna.se/templates/Page____3222.aspx
- www.arbyberattar.se
