= Kulladal =

Neighbourhood of Malmö, Sweden

- Neighbourhood
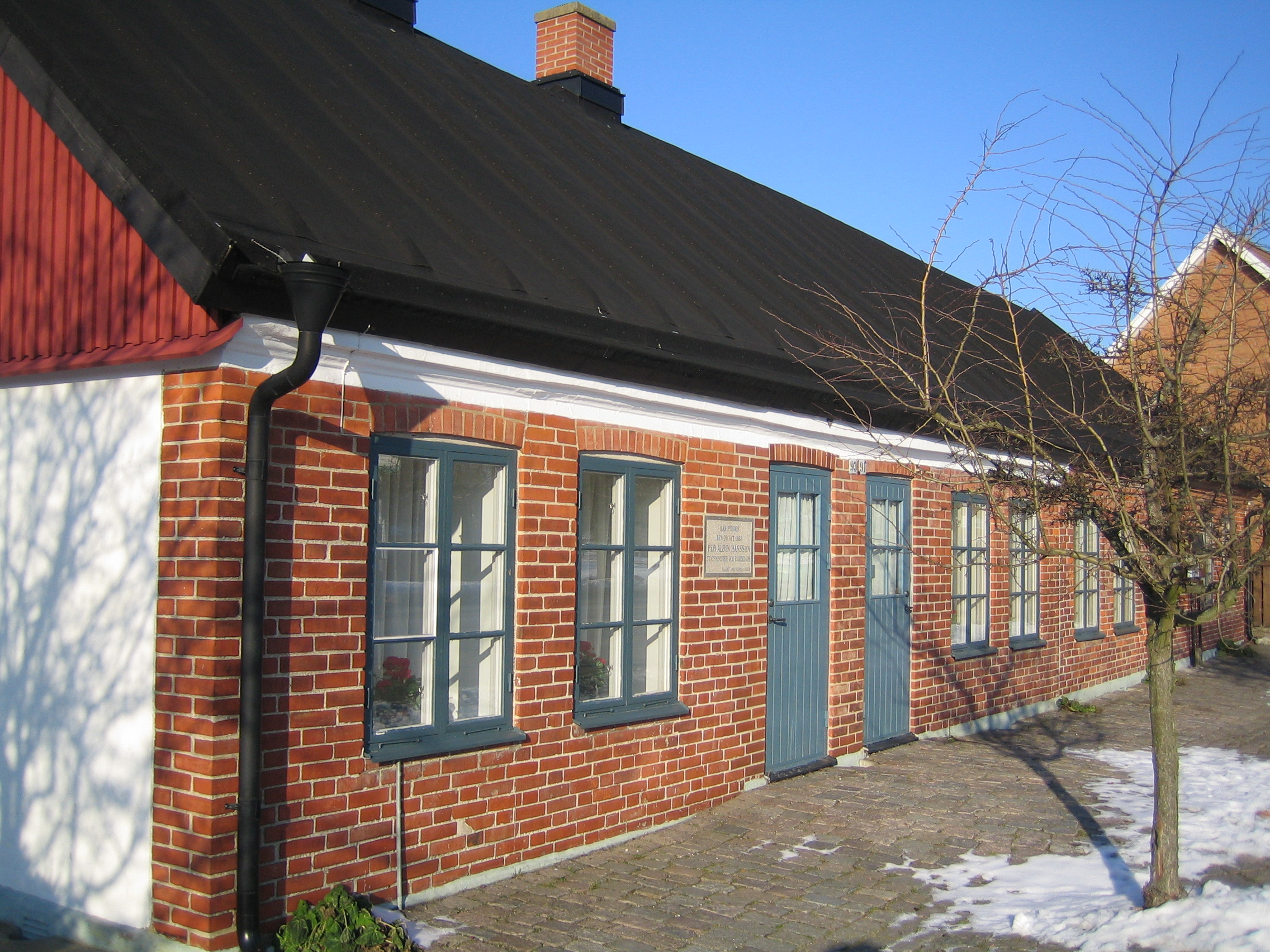
- Interactive map of Kulladal
- Coordinates: 55°34′19″N 12°59′55″E
- Country: Sweden
- Province: Skåne
- County: Skåne County
- Municipality: Malmö Municipality
- Borough of Malmö: Hyllie

Population (2021)
  - Total: 4,776
- Time zone: UTC+1 (CET)
  - Summer (DST): UTC+2 (CEST)

Kulladal (Swedish pronunciation: [kɵlaˈdɑːl]) is a neighbourhood of Malmö, situated in the Borough of Hyllie, Malmö Municipality, Skåne County, Sweden. It was incorporated in Malmö in 1931.

The settlement of Kulladal was built in the 19th century along the important road leading from Malmö to Trelleborg. North of the present Blekingsborg (in the present Mobilia area) there was a large area of sandy soil, and Kulladal used to be bounded to the east by sandy areas around the then Korrebäcken. The old country road was therefore adapted to follow the elevation of the terrain.

== Notable people ==
- Per Albin Hansson, former prime minister (1932–36, 1936–46)
