= Kroksbäcksparken =

Neighbourhood of Malmö, Sweden

- Neighbourhood
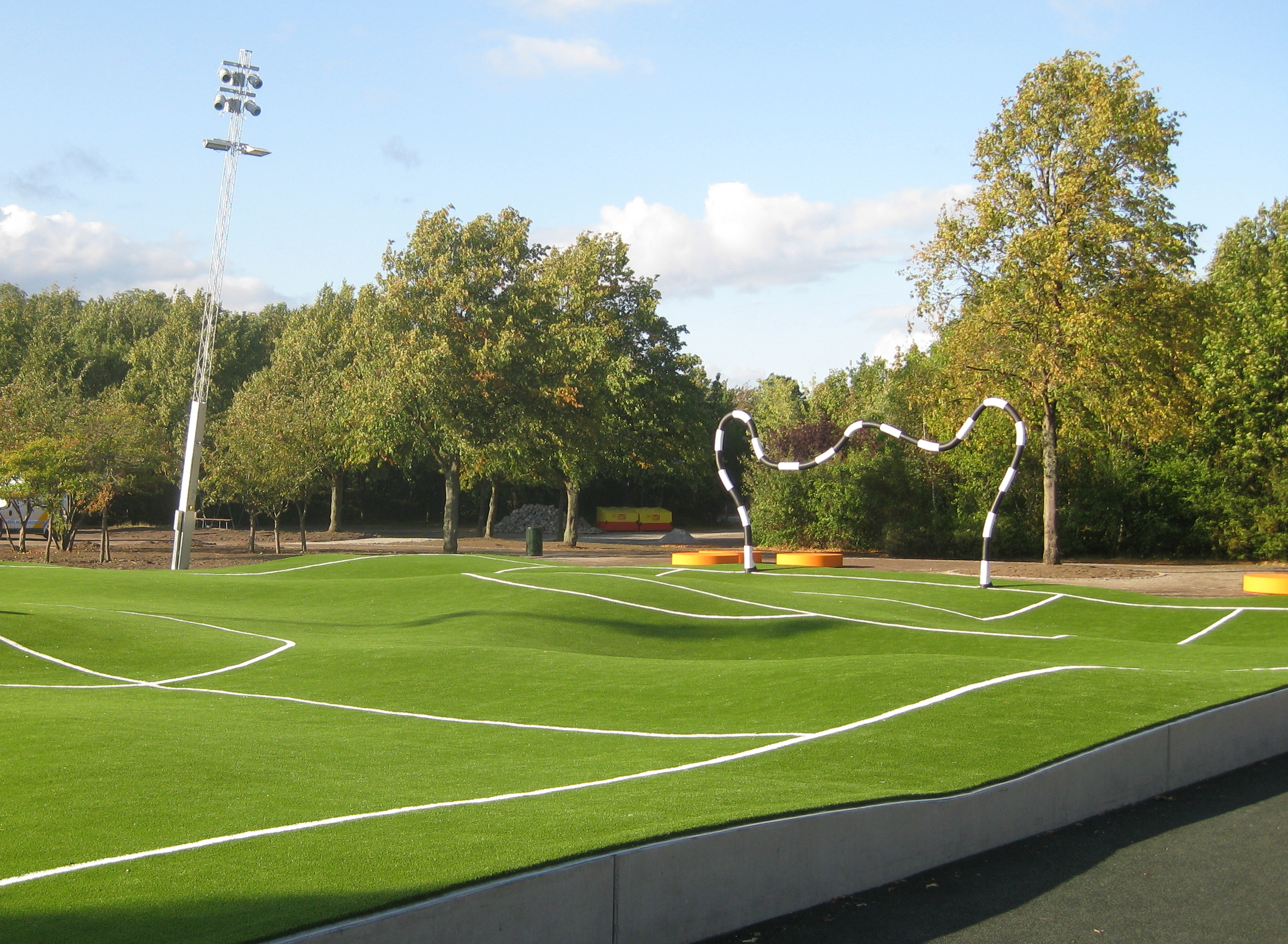
- Interactive map of Kroksbäcksparken
- Coordinates: 55°34′24″N 12°58′47″E
- Country: Sweden
- Province: Skåne
- County: Skåne County
- Municipality: Malmö Municipality
- Borough of Malmö: Hyllie

Population (1 January 2011)
  - Total: 0
- Time zone: UTC+1 (CET)
  - Summer (DST): UTC+2 (CEST)

Kroksbäcksparken is a neighbourhood and park in Malmö, Sweden. It covers an area of 26 hectares.

The park was established in the 1970s. It was built on farmland, and got seven characteristic hills made out of excavation soil from the development of Kroksbäck and Holma. In the 1980s, attempts were made to create a more natural look, and long-lived trees were planted. In the 1990s, ponds were created in the northern part of the park, as well as butterfly sanctuary. It is also home to the world's first undulating football pitch.

In the early 2000s, the park was considered shabby and unsafe, but it has since been overhauled.

The park is mainly visited by inhabitants of nearby Kroksbäck and Holma, and less from other parts of Malmö.
