= Elvavrålet =

Swedish student tradition

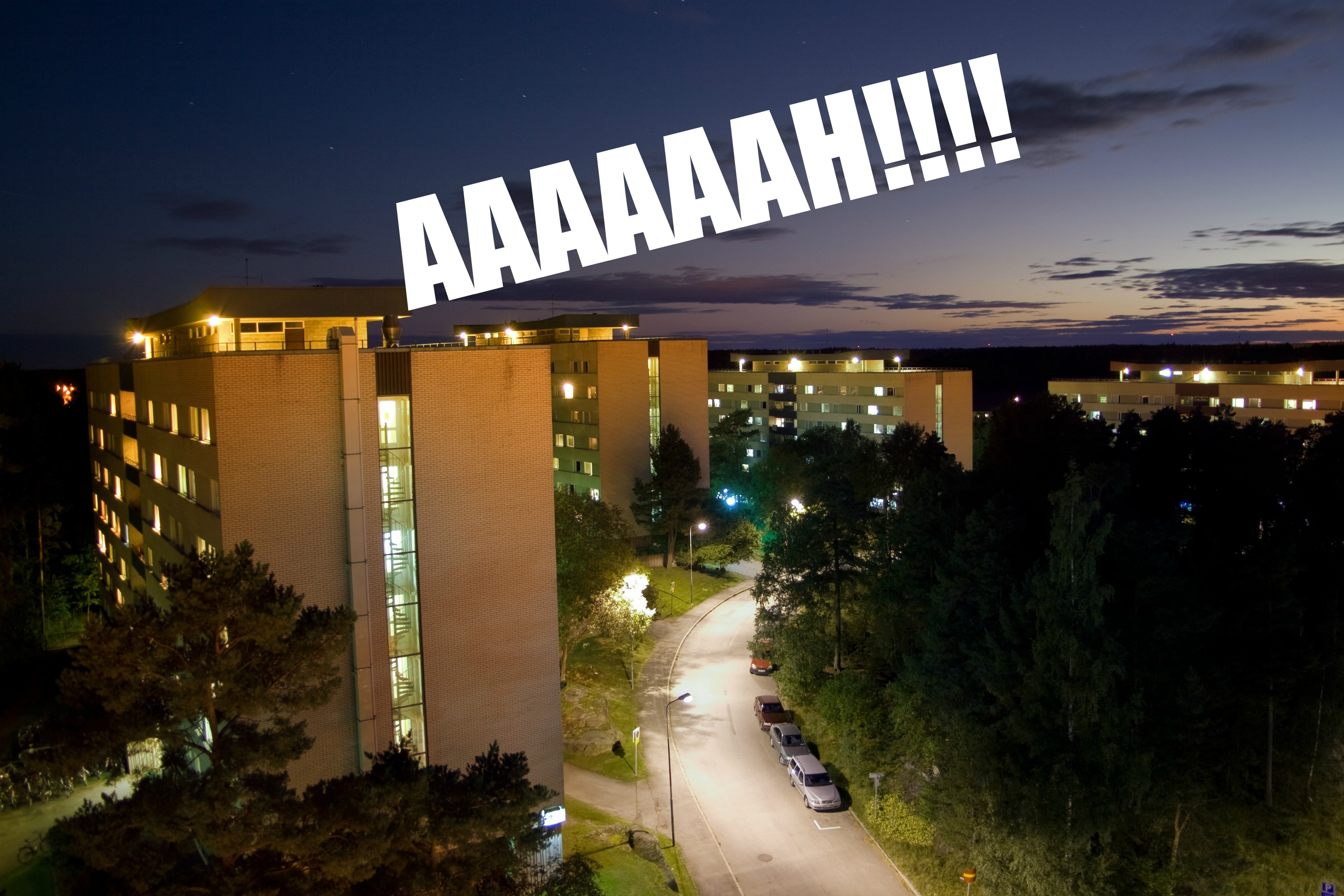
Sernanders väg street, photo taken from the roof of house 8 in Flogsta, Uppsala, Sweden.

Elvavrålet (Swedish: the eleven roar) is a student tradition where students at universities and colleges at a certain time every night in student residential areas (22:00 or 23:00, on Lappkärrsberget only Tuesdays) open their windows, go out onto balconies or rooftops and scream to relieve stress.

The roar is also called the Delphi roar (after the student residential area Delphi in Lund), the Flogsta roar, (after the neighborhood Flogsta in Uppsala) the Lappkärr cry (after the neighborhood Lappkärrsberget in Stockholm), the Ten cry, the Tuesday scream or Anxiety scream. The phenomenon has been known since the 1970s.

In the documentary Himmel över Flogsta, screened at the 2015 Gothenburg Film Festival, director Viktor Johansson chronicles the lives of students forced to live in Flogsta's gray skyscrapers for four years and scream in the night to vent their anxiety.
