= Holma, Malmö =

Neighbourhood of Malmö, Sweden

Holma
- Neighbourhood
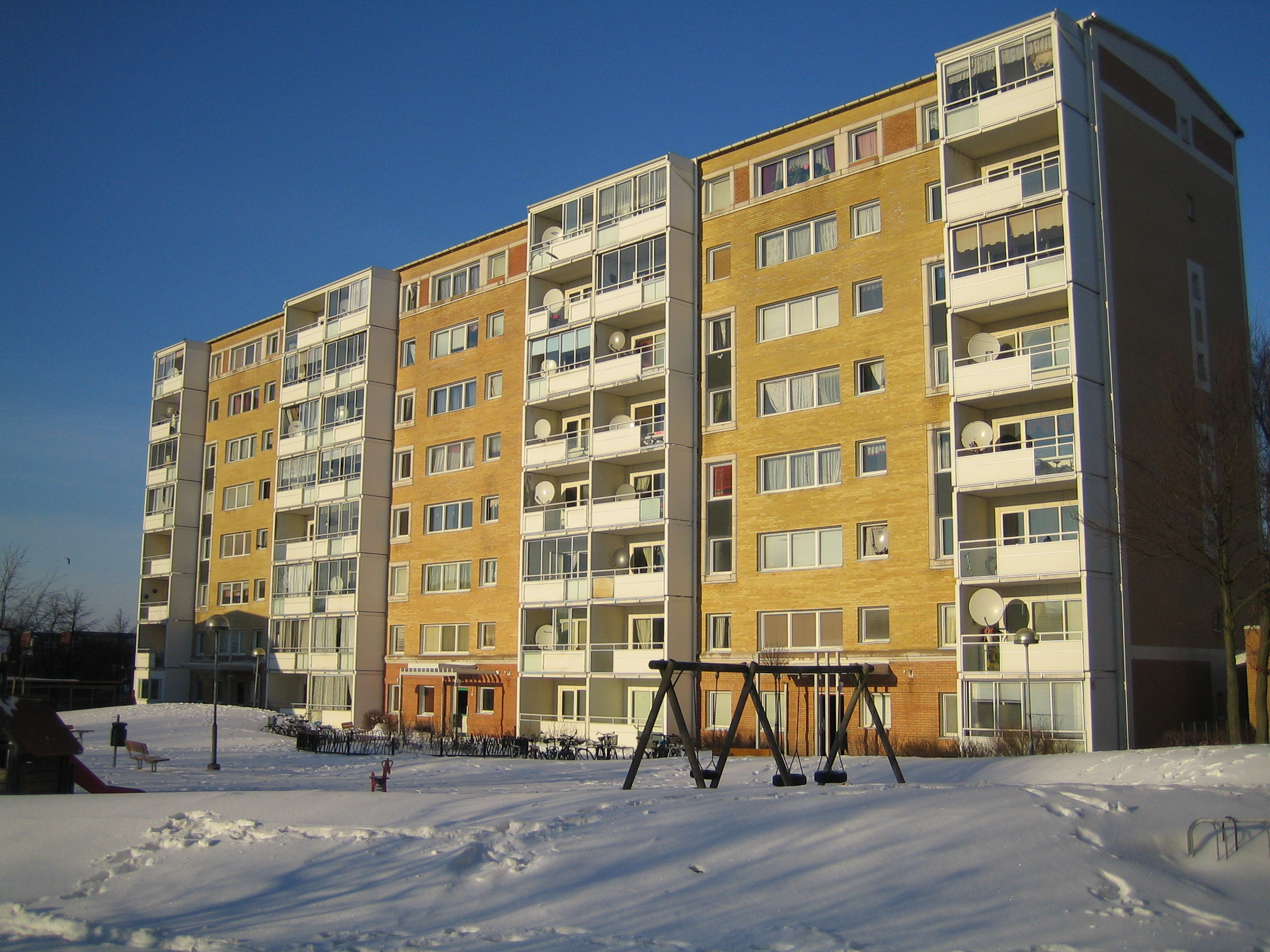
- Interactive map of Holma
- Coordinates: 55°34′21″N 12°59′08″E
- Country: Sweden
- Province: Skåne
- County: Skåne County
- Municipality: Malmö Municipality
- Borough of Malmö: Hyllie

Population (2021)
  - Total: 3,905
- Time zone: UTC+1 (CET)
  - Summer (DST): UTC+2 (CEST)

Holma is a neighbourhood of Malmö, situated in the Borough of Hyllie, Malmö Municipality, Skåne County, Sweden.

Until the 1970s, Holma was mostly farming land. As a result of the Million Programme, the area developed in a short period of time in the beginning of the 1970s, with most buildings completed from 1972 to 1974.
