= Ärtholmen =

Neighbourhood in Sweden

- Neighbourhood
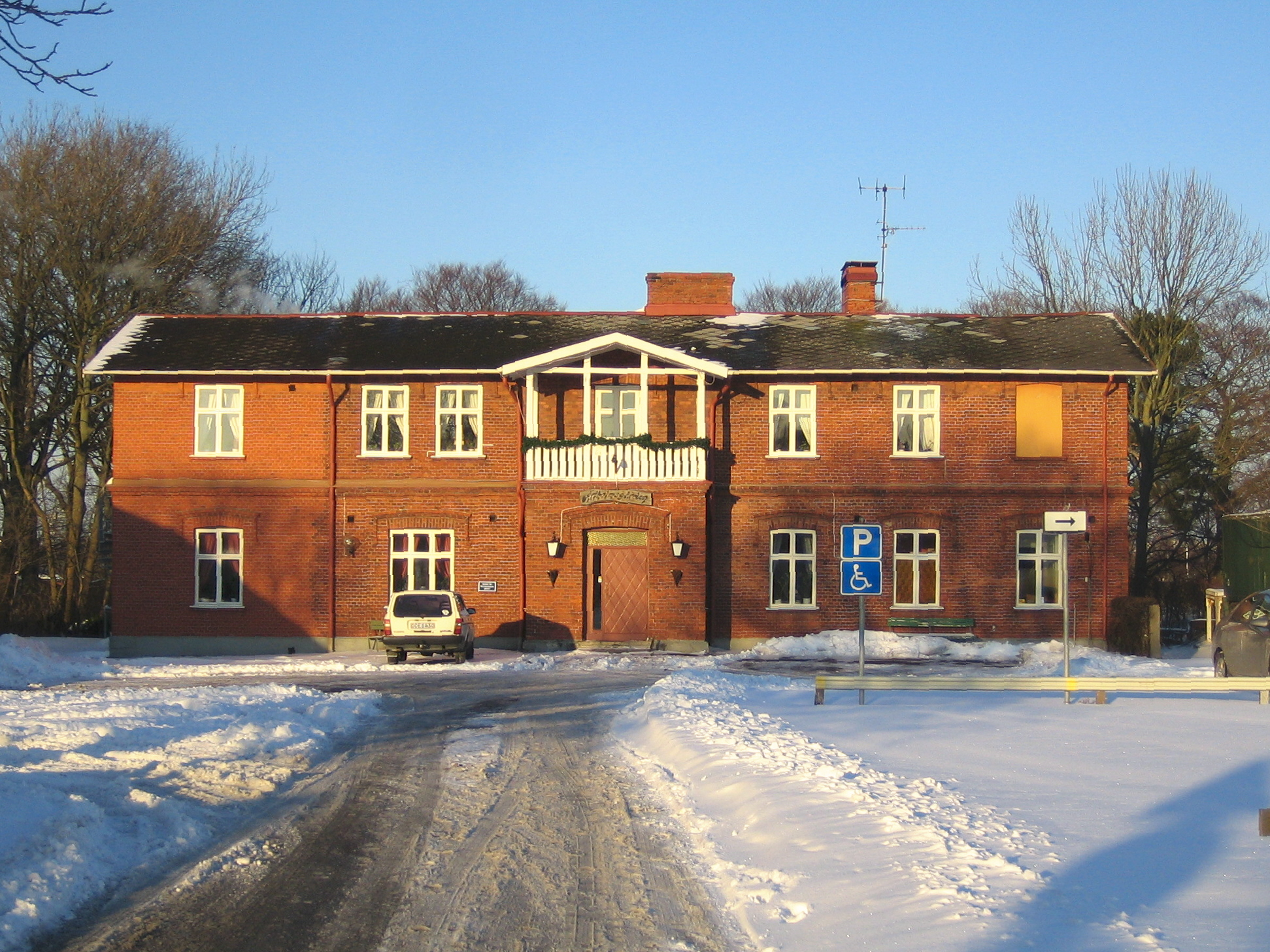

- Location within Skåne Location within Sweden
- Coordinates: 55°34′41″N 12°59′05″E
- Country: Sweden
- Province: Skåne
- County: Skåne County
- Municipality: Malmö Municipality
- Borough of Malmö: Hyllie

Population (1 January 2011)
  - Total: 2
- Time zone: UTC+1 (CET)
  - Summer (DST): UTC+2 (CEST)

Ärtholmen is a neighbourhood of Malmö, situated in the Borough of Hyllie, Malmö Municipality, Skåne County, Sweden.
