= Flogsta =

Urban district in Uppsala, Sweden

Coordinates: 59°51′0.70″N 17°35′32″E

Flogsta as seen from the west

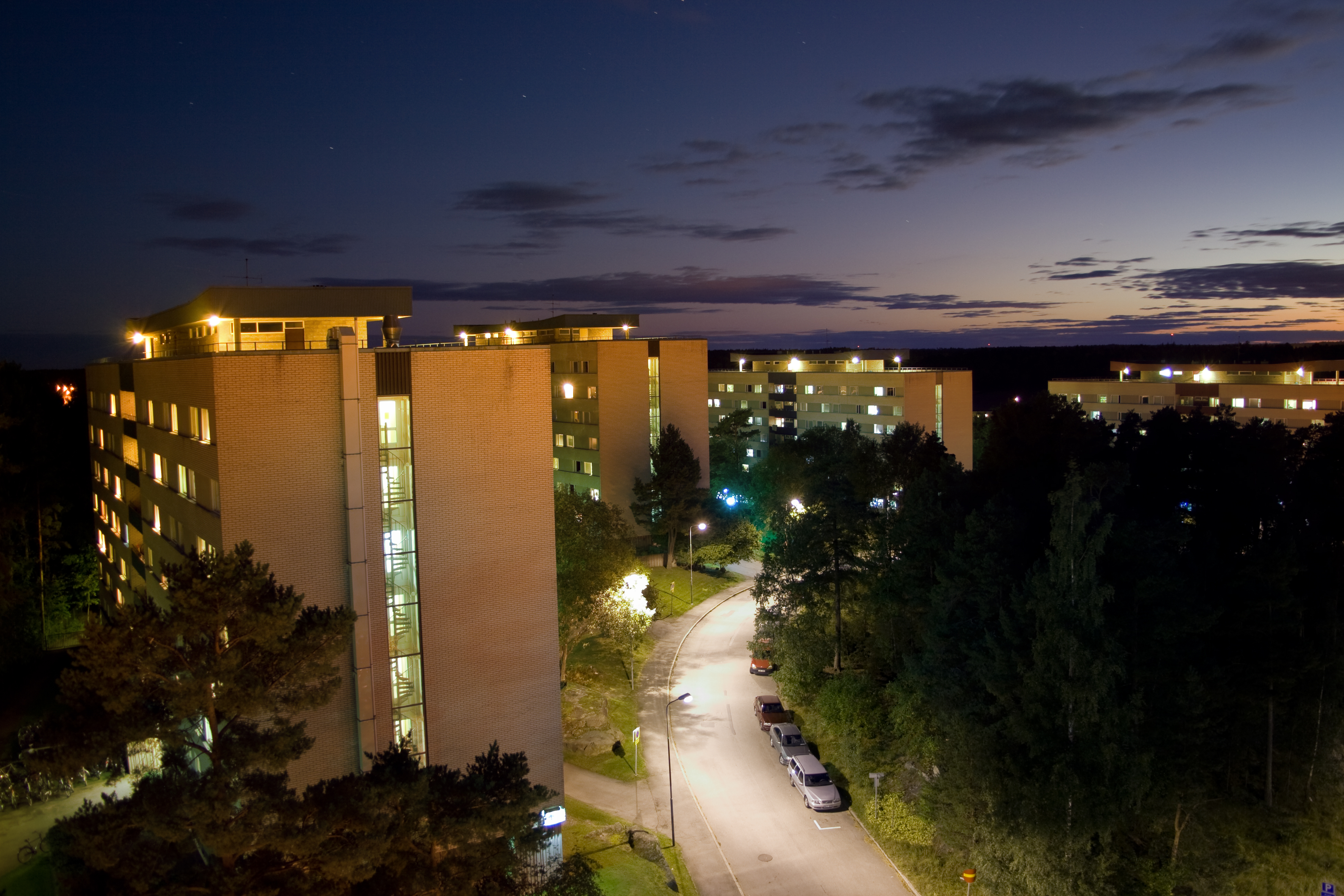
Night shot from the roof of 8, Sernanders väg

Flogsta is a neighbourhood in the west part of the Swedish city of Uppsala. Most of its inhabitants are students attending Uppsala University or the Swedish University of Agricultural Sciences.

== Location ==
The neighbourhood is located approximately 2.8 kilometres (about 4 km by road) west of the Uppsala city centre. There are bus connections and bicycle tracks connecting Flogsta to different parts of the town.

== History ==
The suburb was known as "Flogstoghum" in the Early Middle Ages and was a part of the Church parish of Uppsala. However, it was generally thought to be uninhabited until the late 16th century, when it became part of a 'Kronopark' or "Crown Lands", a semi-forested area owned directly by the Government and used for Government purposes. Until the 1840s, Flogsta was a small village and was not included within the City Limits of Uppsala. Indeed, until 1869, the city boundary of Uppsala to the West ended at Krongatan, a couple of miles to the west of the Castle, to Ekeby in 1898 and to Flogsta in 1912. Large scale habitation and concrete building started only in the 1910s as accommodation for workers in various industries in Central Uppsala, and until the 1920s there were no municipal services in Flogsta. In the 1920s, the first suburban houses came up in Flogsta as residences of white collar workers who worked in the city but wished to live close to the countryside. In the 1950s much of the suburb was earmarked for the Million Programme as student housing, and hence the suburb got its present characteristic as a densely populated "concrete block" student suburb only by the end of the 1960s.

== Flogsta scream ==
Every evening at approximately 22:00, the "Flogsta scream" may be heard, when students individually or collectively shout from windows, balconies and rooftops. According to Uppsala University, the collective screaming acts as "a much-needed safety valve" and "a cry of angst" for students stressed by the demands of university life. The phenomenon also occurs in other university towns and campuses in Sweden, such as Lund, Linköping and the Lappkärrsberget student residence area in Stockholm among others. It is known as Elvavrålet (the Eleven Scream) in Swedish.

== Flogsta cat ==
Flogsta cat, also known as Ingefära or the King of Flogsta, is a male cat that stays in Flogsta. He likes exploring around inside the Flogsta complexes, and enjoys the radiator in buildings during winter. He may also go into your room if you are lucky enough. The students living in Flogsta give him food and water regularly, and some of them also bring him to see a vet. He has been a figure in Flogsta since at least 2016, with his ownership being passed on as people move out.

== Flogsta rooftops ==
The legendary rooftops of the Flogsta high-rises used to be the heart of student social life and the neighbourhood's identity. Closed down indefinitely in 2015, on recommendations of the local authorities, sturdy metal fencing was installed to obstruct access.
