= Kilian Zoll =

Swedish painter (1818–1860)

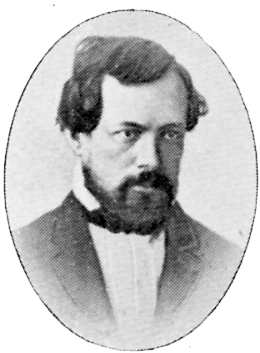
- Born: Kilian Christoffer Zoll; 29 September 1818; Hyllie Parish, Malmöhus, Sweden
- Died: 9 November 1860 (aged 42); Stjärnarp, Eldsberga Parish, Halland County, Sweden
- Education: Royal Swedish Academy of Arts and Kunstakademie Düsseldorf
- Movement: Düsseldorf school of painting
- Spouse: Henriette Gustava Horn af Rantzien (m. 1858)

Signature
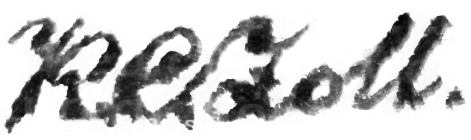

Kilian Christoffer Zoll (20 September 1818 – 9 November 1860) was a Swedish painter, graphic artist and illustrator in the style of the Düsseldorf School. He created genre scenes, landscapes, altarpieces and portraits.

== Biography ==
Zoll was born in the parish of Hyllie in Malmöhus, Scania, Sweden. He was the son of Nils Fredrik Zoll and Catarina Christina Knutsson. His father was a lieutenant in the Swedish Army. He initially attended Malmö Læromsskola in Malmö, but interrupted his course work to study art in Stockholm. From 1836 to 1849, he studied at the Royal Swedish Academy of Fine Arts with Fredric Westin, Per Krafft and Carl Johan Fahlcrantz, but found it necessary to suspend his work there on several occasions so he could paint and sell portraits to support his education.

While at the Academy, he focused on history painting but, soon after, displayed a preference for scenes from folk life. In pursuit of this goal, from the autumn of 1845 to the spring of 1846 he was enrolled at the Royal Danish Academy of Fine Arts in Copenhagen, where he studied with Christoffer Wilhelm Eckersberg and was inspired by the lectures of Niels Laurits Høyen.

He then visited Skåne, Halland, Småland and Dalarna. In 1842, a visit to Botorp in Linderås parish in Jönköping resulted in a commission for an altarpiece at Linderås Church (Linderås kyrka). During the First Schleswig War, he accompanied the Kronoberg Regiment to Denmark, but stopped in Copenhagen when Sweden decided not to enter the war; painting portraits there for several months.

From 1852 to 1855, he lived in Düsseldorf where he worked with the history painter Theodor Hildebrandt and the Norwegian painter Adolph Tidemand. Then he traveled between Sweden and Düsseldorf several times. In 1856 Zoll tried to get a travel grant from the Academy, but was turned down because he was older than the rules allowed.

== Personal life ==
In 1858, he married Henriette Gustava Horn af Rantzien, who belonged to an old noble family. He had planned to return to Düsseldorf, but fell ill and died while travelling in Halland. Many of his commissioned works were left unfinished at the time of his death. They were completed by his friend, Bengt Nordenberg (1822–1902).

His works may be seen at the Göteborgs konstmuseum, Nationalmuseum the Nordiska museet and Kulturen in Lund.

== Selected paintings ==
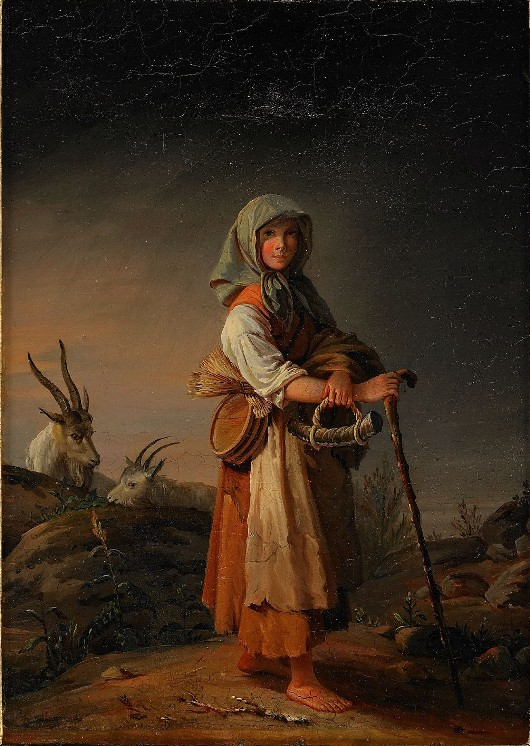
Peasant Girl
(1850)

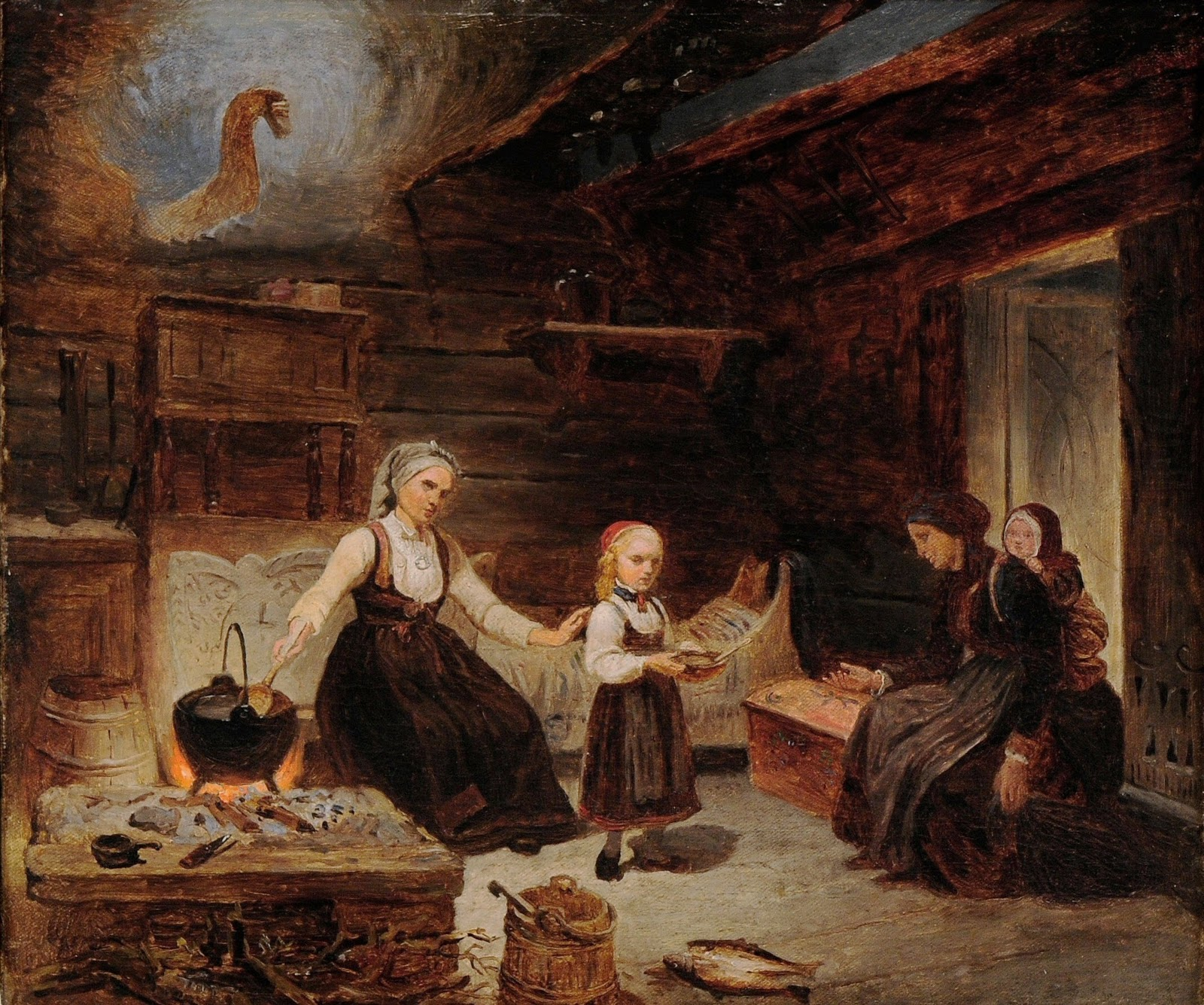
Interior with Women and Children
(c. 1860)

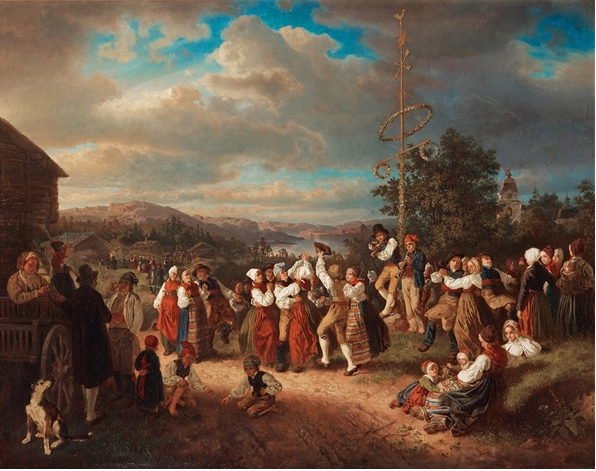
Midsummer Dance in Rättvik
(1852)

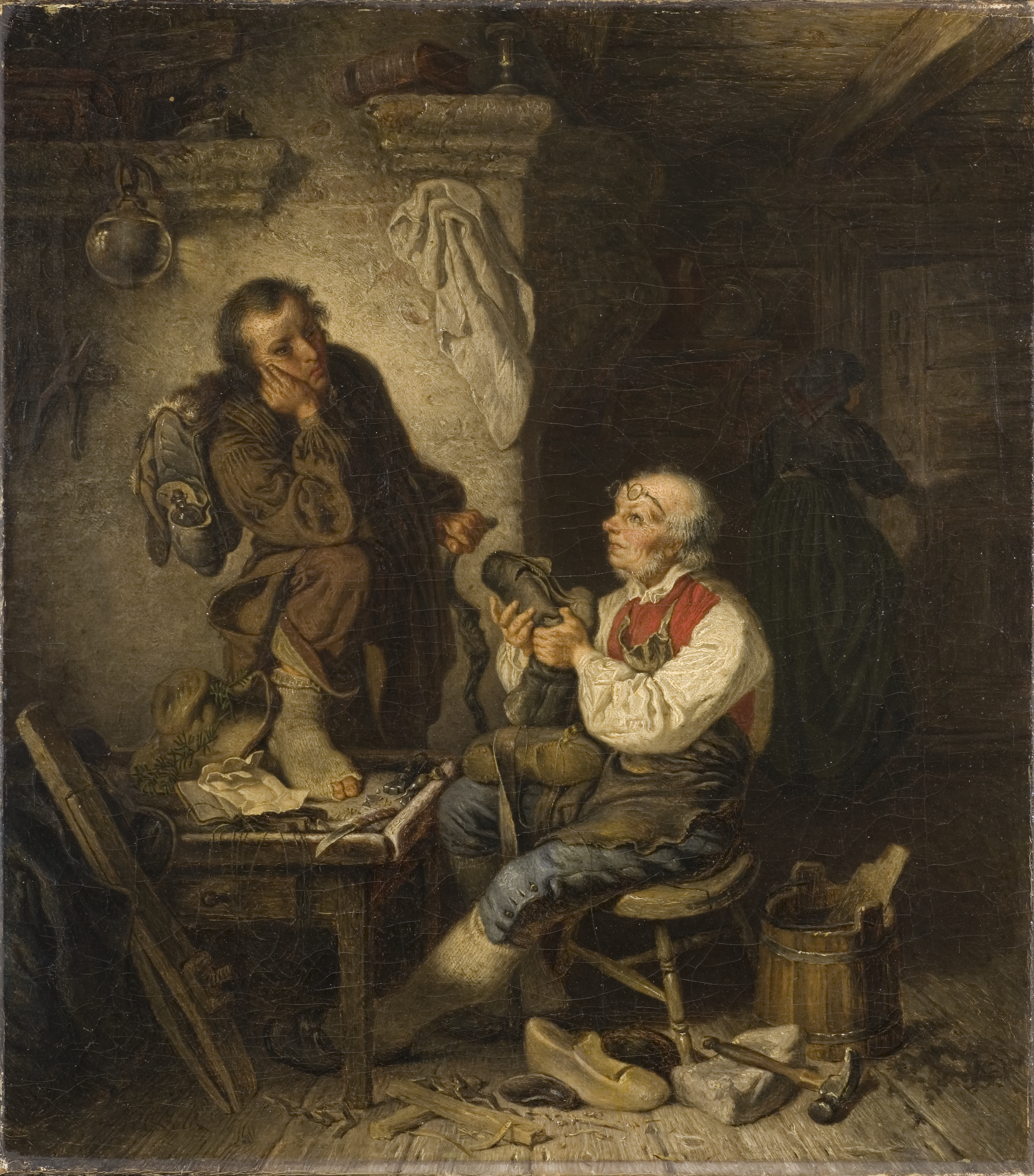
A Travelling Journeyman

== Other sources ==
- Biography Nordisk Familjebok
- Biography Svenskt Biografiskt Handlexikon
