= Hylliebadet =

Public swimming venue in Malmö, Sweden

Coordinates: 55°34′13″N 12°58′39″E

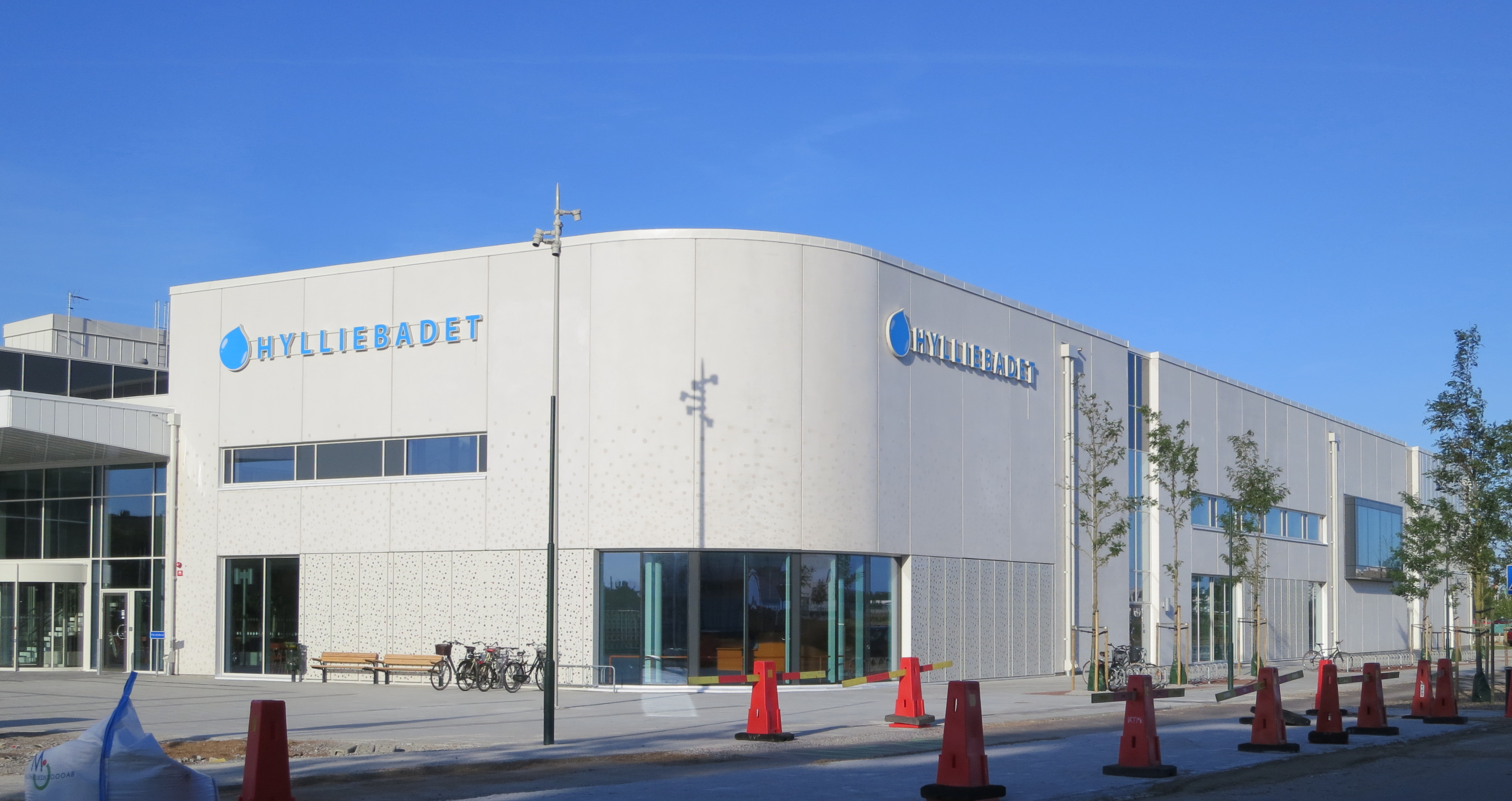
- Hylliebadet, August 2015
- Interactive map of Hylliebadet
- Full name: Hylliebadet
- Address: Malmö, Sweden

Construction
- Built: 2013–2015
- Opened: 15 August 2015
- Architect: PP Arkitekter

Hylliebadet is a public swimming venue in Malmö city, Sweden, owned by the municipality of Malmö. It opened on 15 August 2015.

The swimming complex has an area of 11,500 m^{2}, with one 50-metre pool, two training pools, family pools with water slides and a relaxation area with sauna, cold and warm water pools, and an outdoor pool. There is also a fitness area.

Built with 700 m^{2} solar panels on the roof and energy-saving solutions, Hylliebadet is self-sufficient in energy. It was designed by PP Arkitekter and built by NCC AB.
