= Gröndal, Malmö =

Neighbourhood of Malmö, Sweden

Gröndal
- Neighbourhood
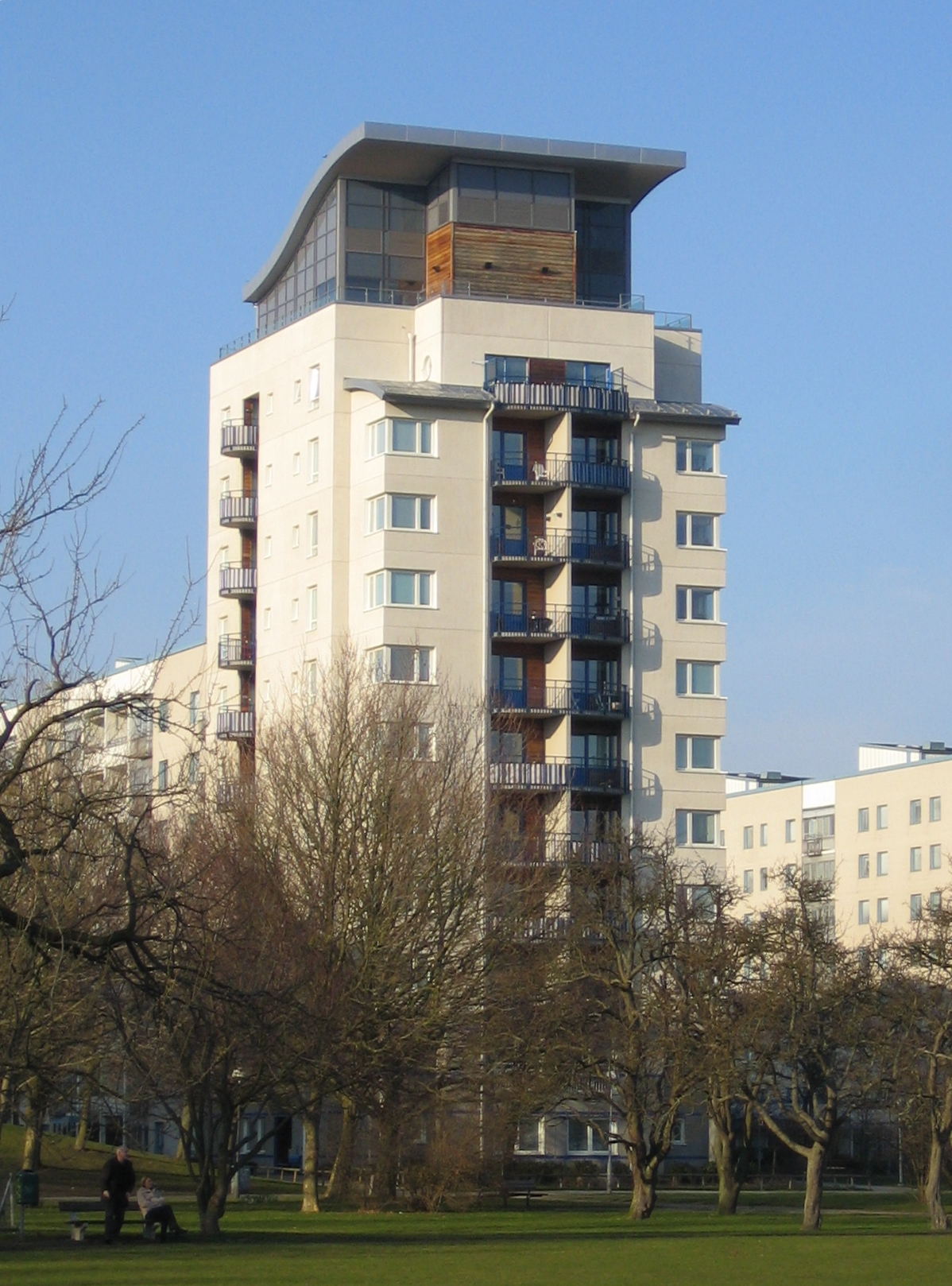
- Interactive map of Gröndal
- Coordinates: 55°34′38″N 12°59′48″E
- Country: Sweden
- Province: Skåne
- County: Skåne County
- Municipality: Malmö Municipality
- Borough of Malmö: Hyllie

Population (2021)
  - Total: 2,027
- Time zone: UTC+1 (CET)
  - Summer (DST): UTC+2 (CEST)

Gröndal is a neighbourhood of Malmö in the Borough of Hyllie, Malmö Municipality, Skåne County, Sweden.
