= Lindeborg =

- Neighbourhood
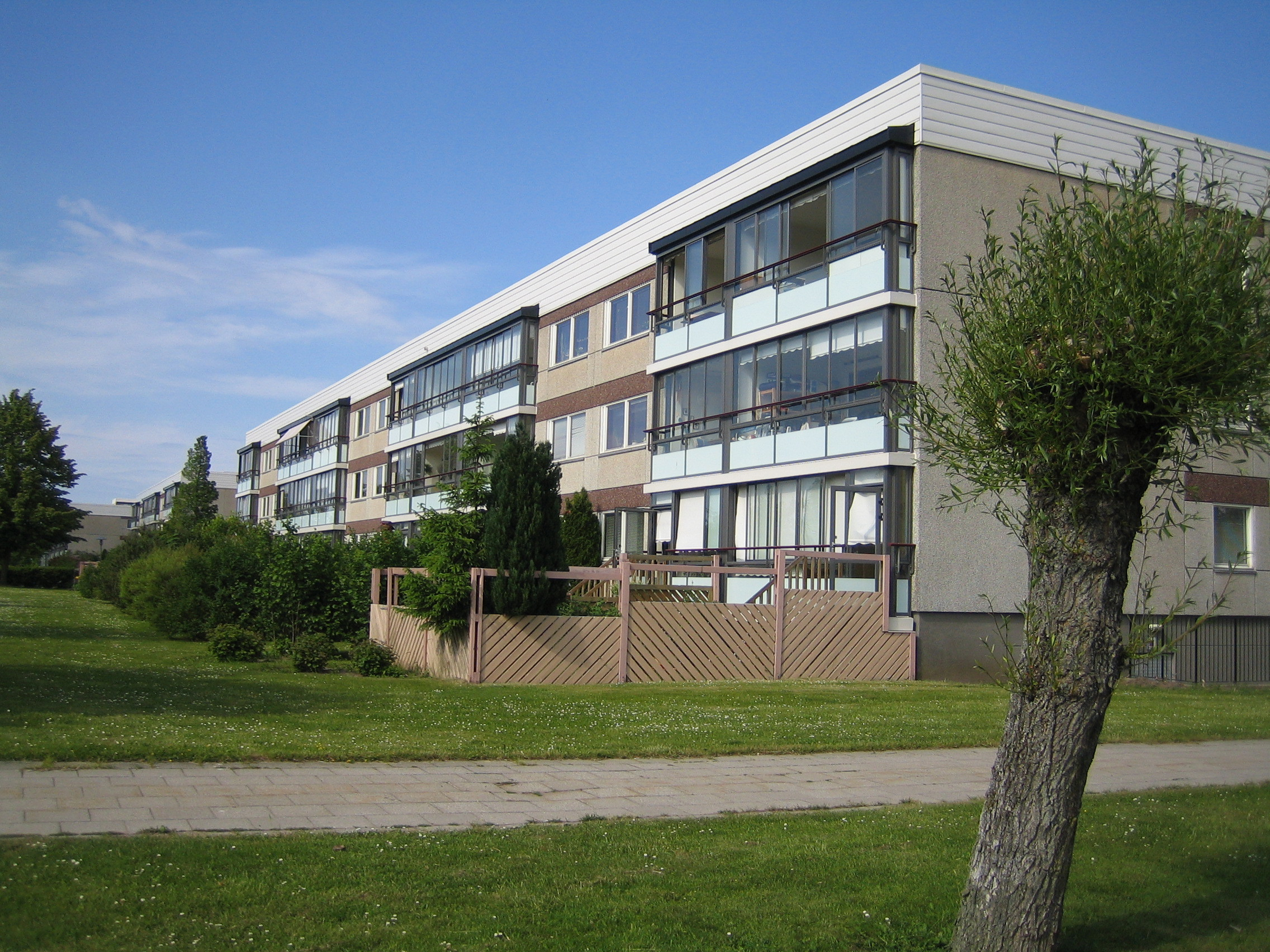
- Interactive map of Lindeborg
- Coordinates: 55°33′39″N 12°59′33″E
- Country: Sweden
- Province: Skåne
- County: Skåne County
- Municipality: Malmö Municipality
- Borough of Malmö: Hyllie

Population (2021)
  - Total: 4,970
- Time zone: UTC+1 (CET)
  - Summer (DST): UTC+2 (CEST)

Lindeborg is a neighbourhood of Malmö, situated in the Borough of Hyllie, Malmö Municipality, Skåne County, Sweden.
