= Fittja gård =

Historic building in Sweden

Coordinates: 59°14′48″N 17°51′54″E

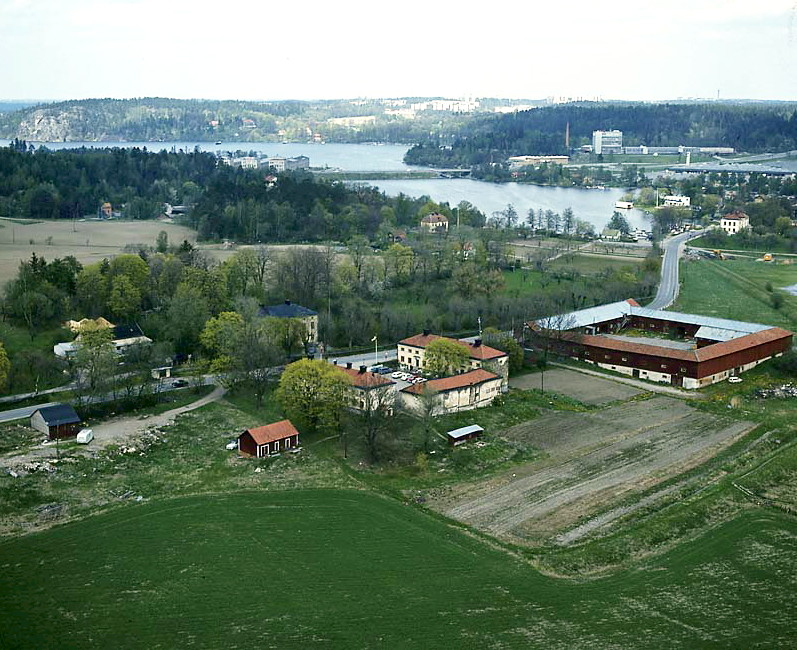
Fittja gård in 1967; the square structure on the right is the barn, Fittja loge.

Fittja gård is a former manor, coaching inn and station for post riders in Fittja, Botkyrka Municipality, Stockholm County, east-central Sweden. Fittja Värdshus, attached to it, was one of the largest travellers' hostels in Sweden during the 17th and 18th centuries. From 1660 to 1916 the Tingsrätt (district court) for the Svartlösa Hundred was located on the estate, and the present Fittja gård dates to 1812. According to the Stockholm County Museum, the buildings are well-preserved and valued as a cultural heritage. Fittja gård is the headquarters of a mångkulturellt centrum (multicultural centre) founded in 1987.

== History ==
Fittja gård is first mentioned in a letter of tenancy dated to 1299, and the village of Fittja was settled in the Middle Ages. During the Protestant Reformation, the estate was confiscated; its land was worked by local farmers until 1631, when Erik van der Linde (owner of the nearby Lindhovens gård on Lake Aspen) took possession.

=== Inn, postal station and court location ===
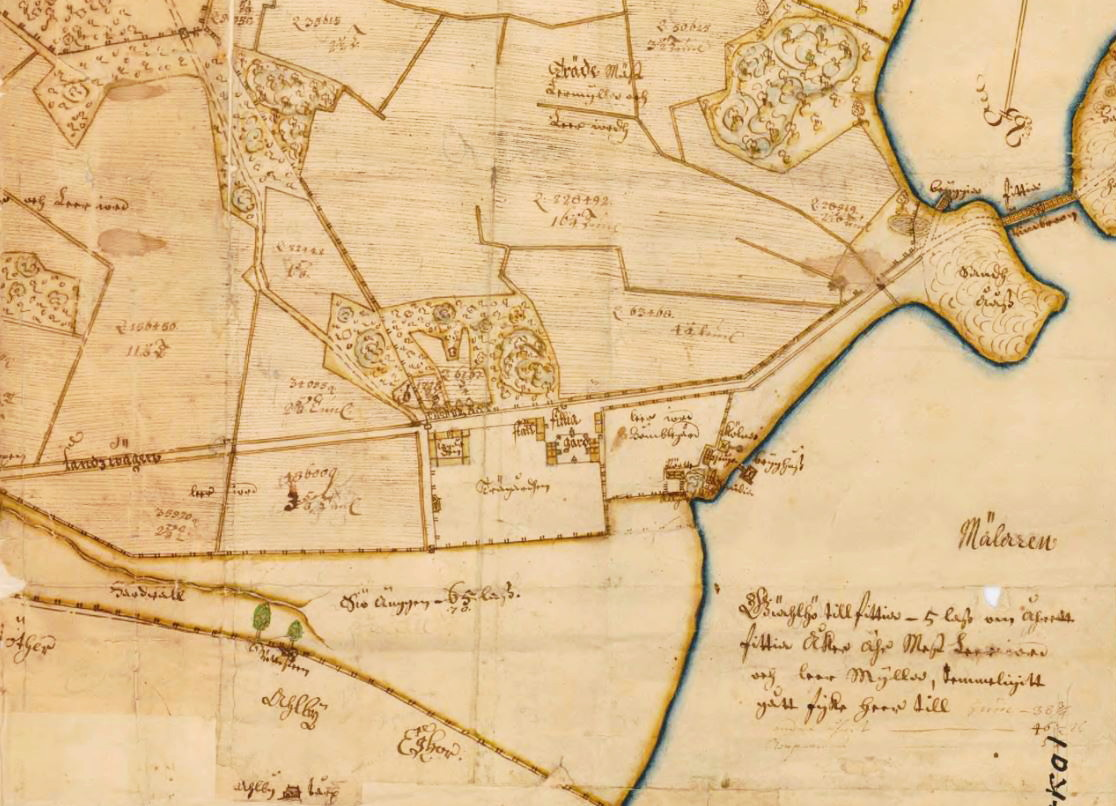
Map of Fittja gård, 1664

In 1633, a new road was begun to replace the ancient Göta highway between Stockholm and Helsingborg: Södertäljevägen, later known as Riksväg 1. It was completed in 1669 with a bridge at the head of Lake Alby at Fittja Point; Fittja gård was then on the main highway, a day's drive—1 1/2 Uppland miles, or 16 kilometres (9.9 mi)—by horse and cart from Stockholm. A coaching inn was established; travellers made their first change of horses here on their journey south from Stockholm, and royal permission was obtained to serve food and drink. The first innkeeper was Gustaf Mattsson, a Stockholm alderman who set up a dining establishment in 1663 in a building constructed at his own expense. The hostel opened in 1666, with 20 horses for travellers (although many complaints of worn-out and otherwise unsatisfactory horses are recorded). In 1667, Fittja gård also became a station for post riders, with six riders and twelve horses in their own stable. The establishment also included a farm, a distillery and a large brickworks. The Tingsrätt for the Svartlösa Hundred moved to Fittja gård, remaining there until 1916.

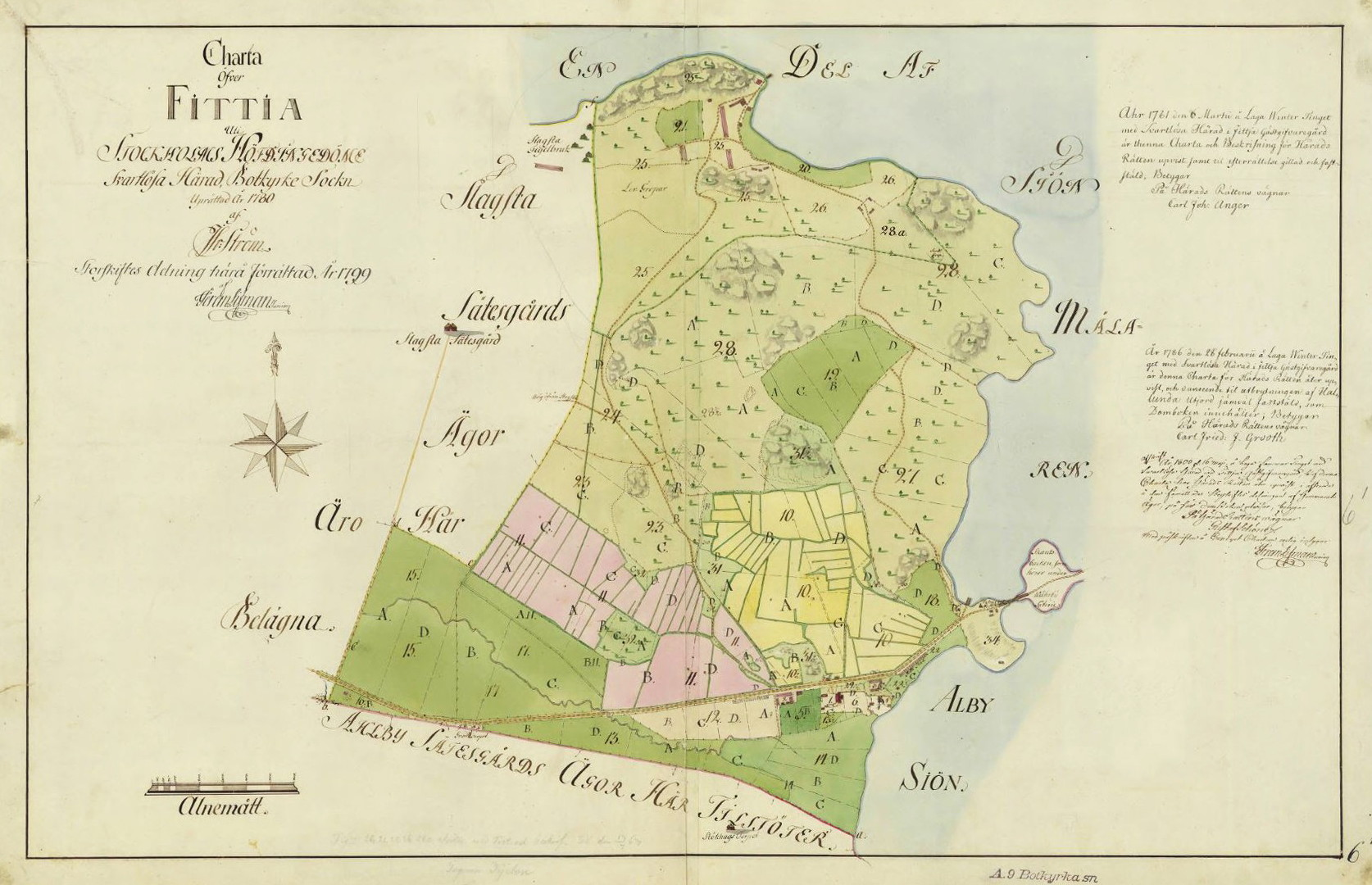
Map of Fittja gård in 1780

During the 18th century the estate changed ownership a number of times, and a new main house was built in mid-century. The 1780s estate extended from Mälaren in the north to Alby gård in the south, and from Fittja Point and Lake Alby in the east to Slagsta gård in the west. From 1778 to 1787 its owner was financier Johan Liljencrantz, one of the largest landowners in the socken and lord of Sturehov Manor and the seat farm of Norsborg. In 1787, the northern section with the brickworks became part of Slagsta.

Fittja gård, one of the largest inns in Sweden, was frequented by many travellers. Among those who changed horses or spent the night there were Kings Charles XII and Oscar I and Carl Linnaeus, who described "wait[ing] a long time for horses" at Fittja in 1741. King Gustav III and his court also stayed at Fittja, arriving by barge from Drottningholm Palace. Carl Michael Bellman wrote about life at the inn.

=== Jacob Schmidt ownership ===
In 1809, merchant Jacob Schmidt became the owner of the estate and inn. He improved the facilities, building the present buildings and a large barn (later known as Fittja loge) which held about 40 cows and several horses until World War II. After the estate stopped keeping livestock, the barn was a popular locale for dances and parties. Schmidt moved the mid-18th-century main house about 500 metres (1,600 ft) to the northeast, where it is now known as Ängsbyggningen (the Meadow Building). The longtime residence of a tenant farmer, it is presently a private home. The main house was replaced by an 1812 two-storey Empire style house, with two flanking wing buildings and a stable forming the sides of a courtyard. The east wing housed a courtroom, jail, guardhouse and restaurant and the west wing a post office, brewery, bakery and guest rooms. The highway ran just south of the main building, through the courtyard.

Soon afterwards steamboat service began, largely supplanting coach travel since it was safer and more comfortable. Schmidt's money ran out in 1815, and he was forced to sell the estate at auction. Crown Prince Oscar (later Oscar I of Sweden) wrote in his journal in 1841 that although Fittja "[shone] amongst the other estate inns like the North Star in the firmament, it [was] now ... quiet and deserted there".

=== Carlsson family ownership ===
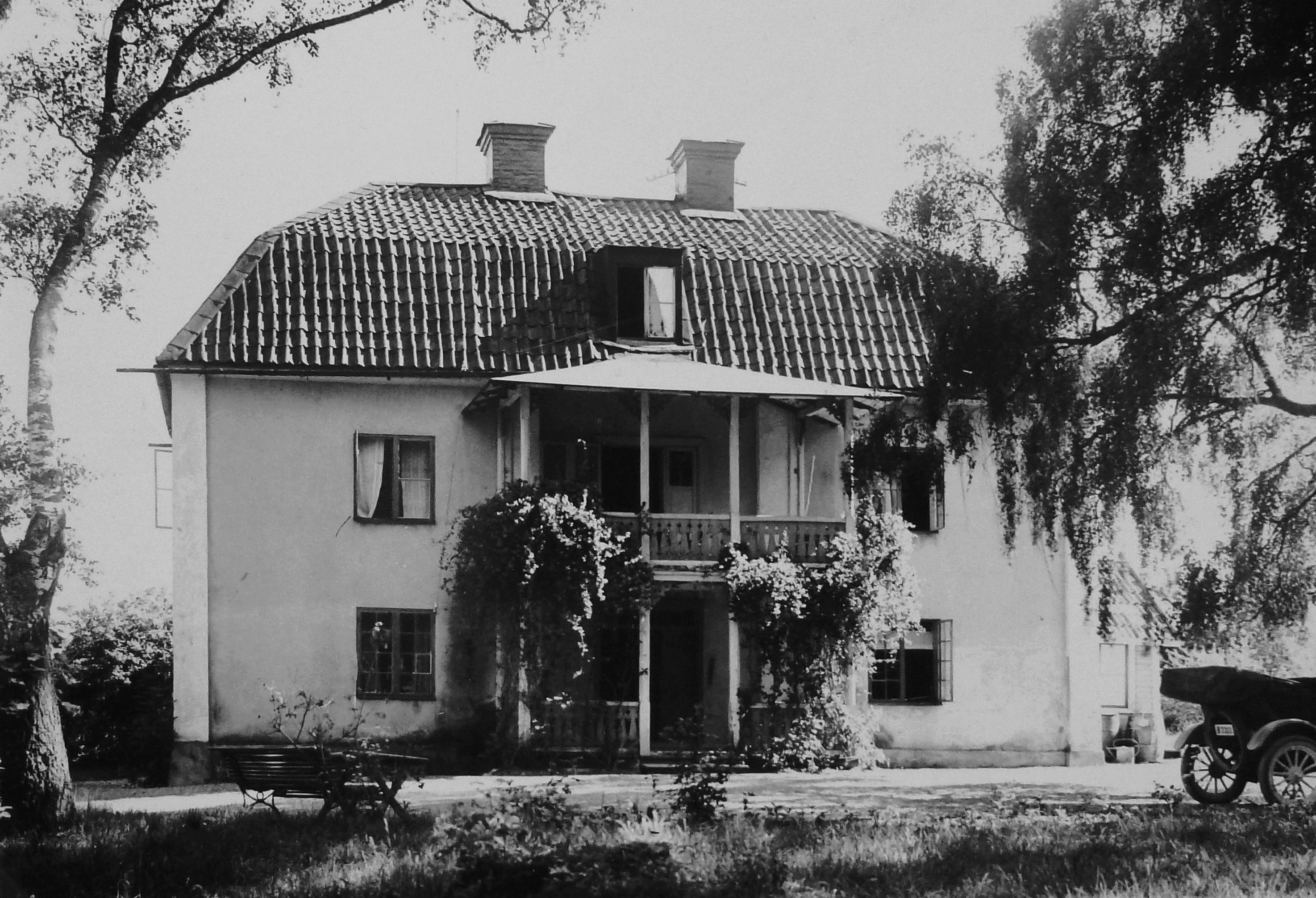
The 18th-century main house, Ängsbyggningen, in 1910

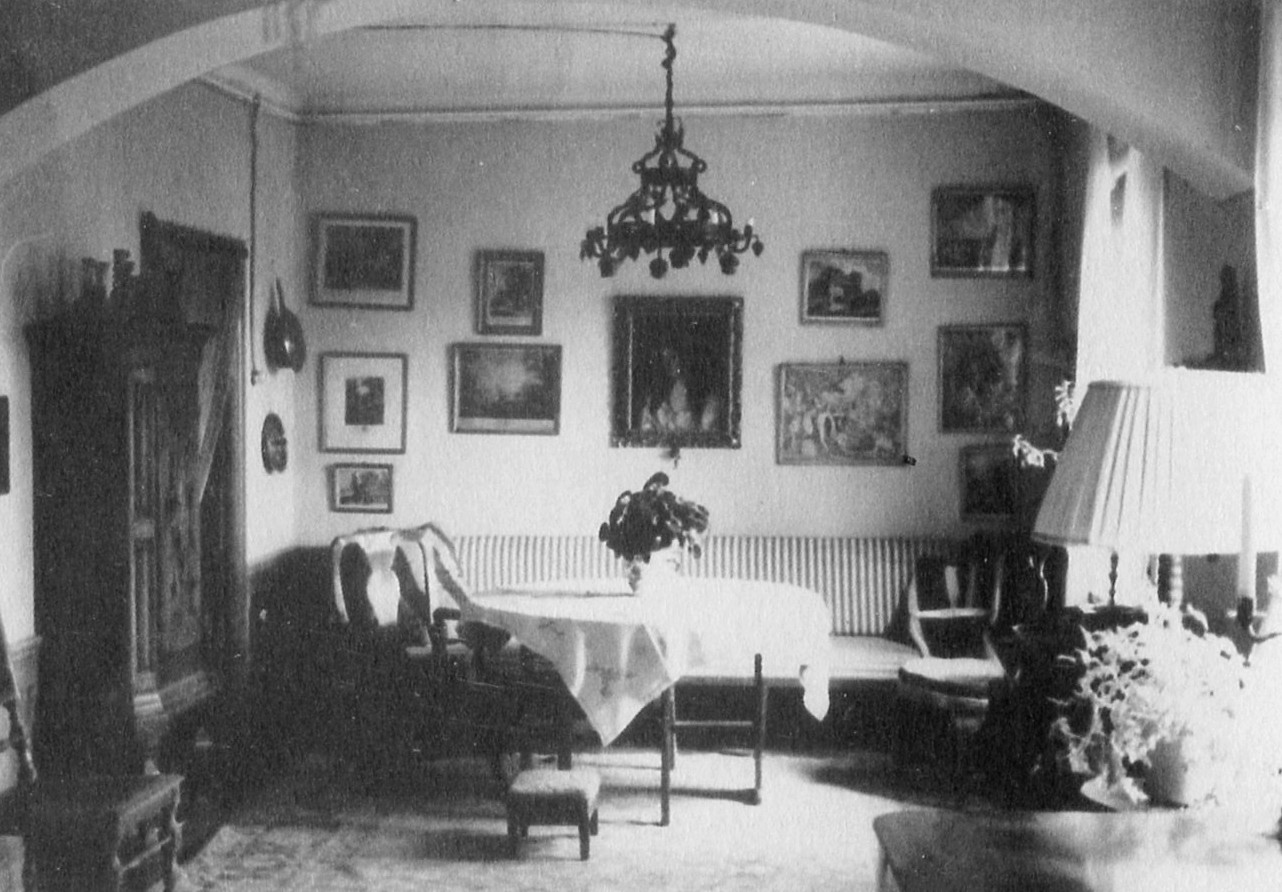
Main-house interior during the 1960s

The estate then changed hands several times. In 1859 it was sold to Lars Magnus Carlsson, a wealthy farmer and Riksdag member. Although the estate's liquor licence was revoked in 1873 because of drunkenness and fighting, the inn continued in operation (with some interruptions) until 1972. A new brickworks, opened during the 1860s on Fittja Point, operated until 1964. Agriculture and brickmaking were now the estate's main sources of income. Carlsson became one of the largest farmers in the Mälaren Valley; in addition to Fittja, he owned the Glömsta, Norsborg, Hallunda and Flemingsberg estates.

Carlsson died in 1899 and was succeeded by his son, Hjalmar. However, the younger Carlsson was less interested in farming; he spent more time hunting and fishing, and the estate was now managed by a tenant farmer. In 1900, Carlsson married Elise Kärger, a German girl he met at a gathering at Alby Manor (near Fittja gård), in Berlin. They did not move to Fittja until 1903, and the inn was now a destination for daytrippers. Carlsson sold the brickyard in 1914 and the gravel pit in 1924.

During the 1920s, the estate became known for its fruit production, with vegetables and fruit (especially raspberries) grown along the road extending north of the estate and sold in Stockholm. However, in the early 1970s the land was built upon as north Botkyrka was developed.

=== Ragnar Sellberg and municipal ownership ===
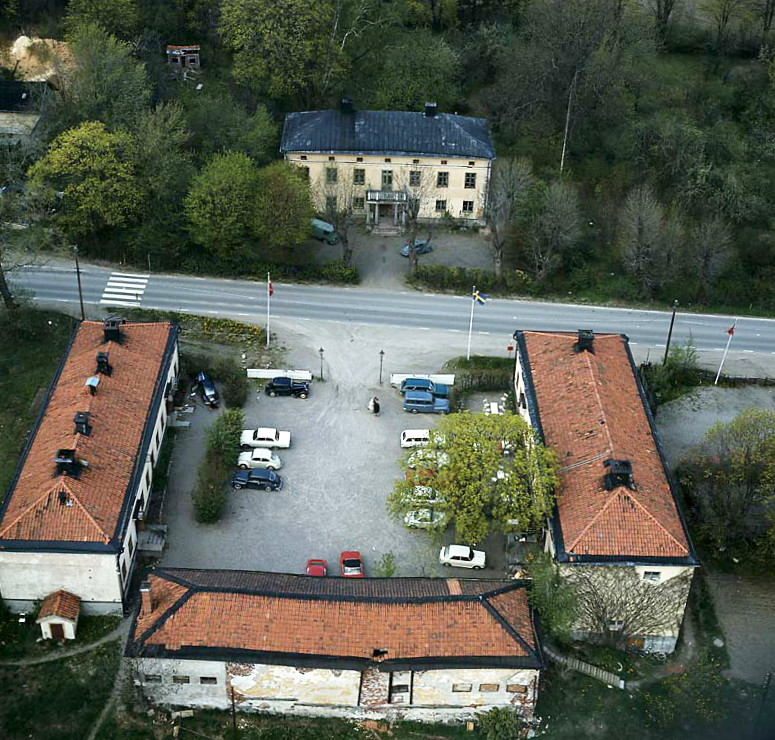
Aerial view of Fittja gård in 1967; in the foreground are the now-demolished stables.

Carlsson died in 1950, and his widow was allowed to continue living there until her death in 1974. In 1955, after his estate was settled, Fittja gård was bought by businessman Ragnar Sellberg. Although at first Sellberg invested a great deal of money to develop a garden city centred on the estate, he was unable to realise his vision and lost interest. He let the estate fall into decay, and in 1967 sold the main buildings to the Stockholm Municipality and the outlying land to builder Ernst Ehn. AB Ehn and Company and the architectural firm Höjer and Ljungqvist then developed much of modern Botkyrka. After the last tenants left in 1983, the buildings were renovated; the flanking buildings became a daycare centre, and the main house a People's House.

== Current use ==
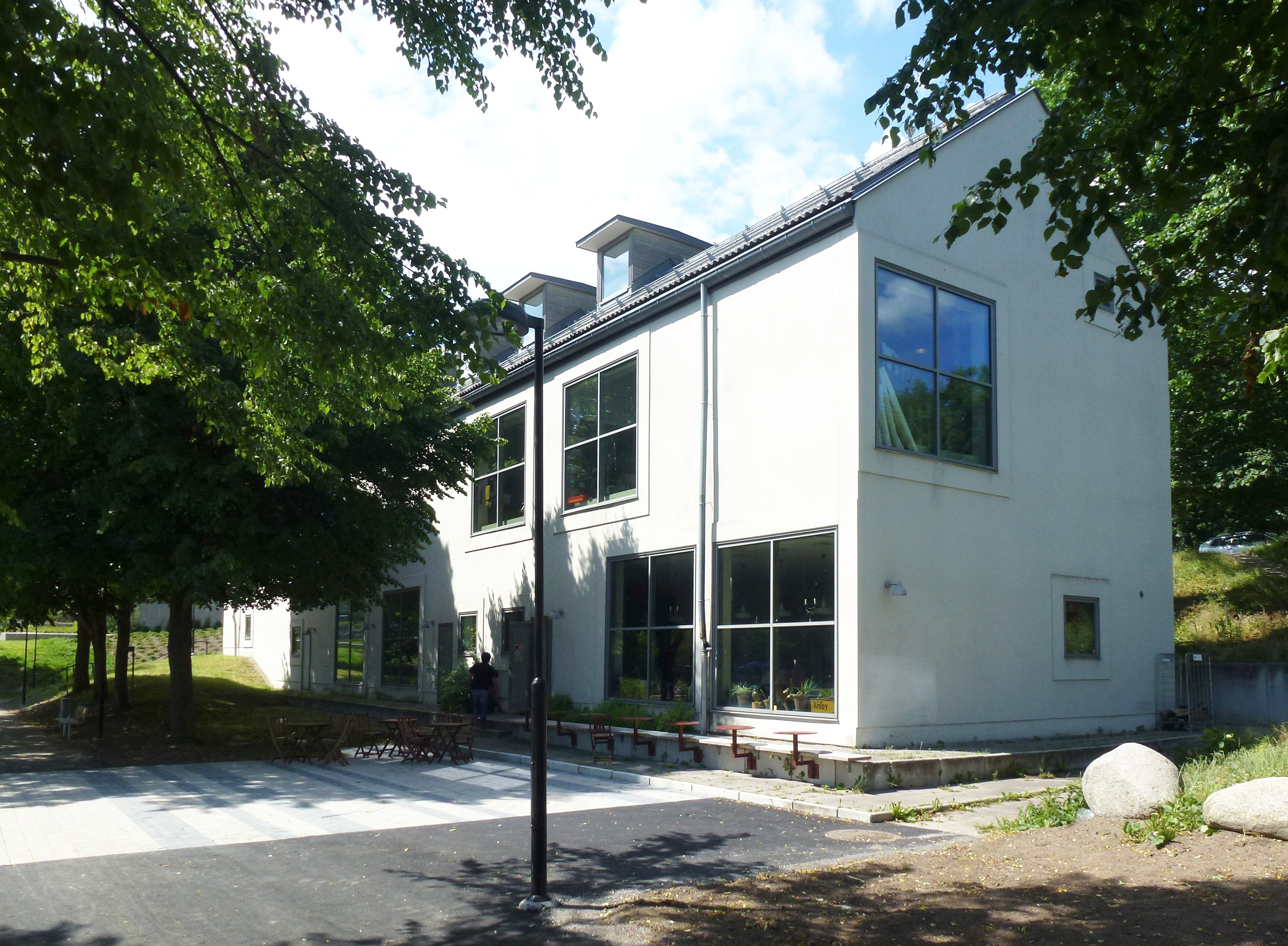
New exhibition building, on the site of the stables

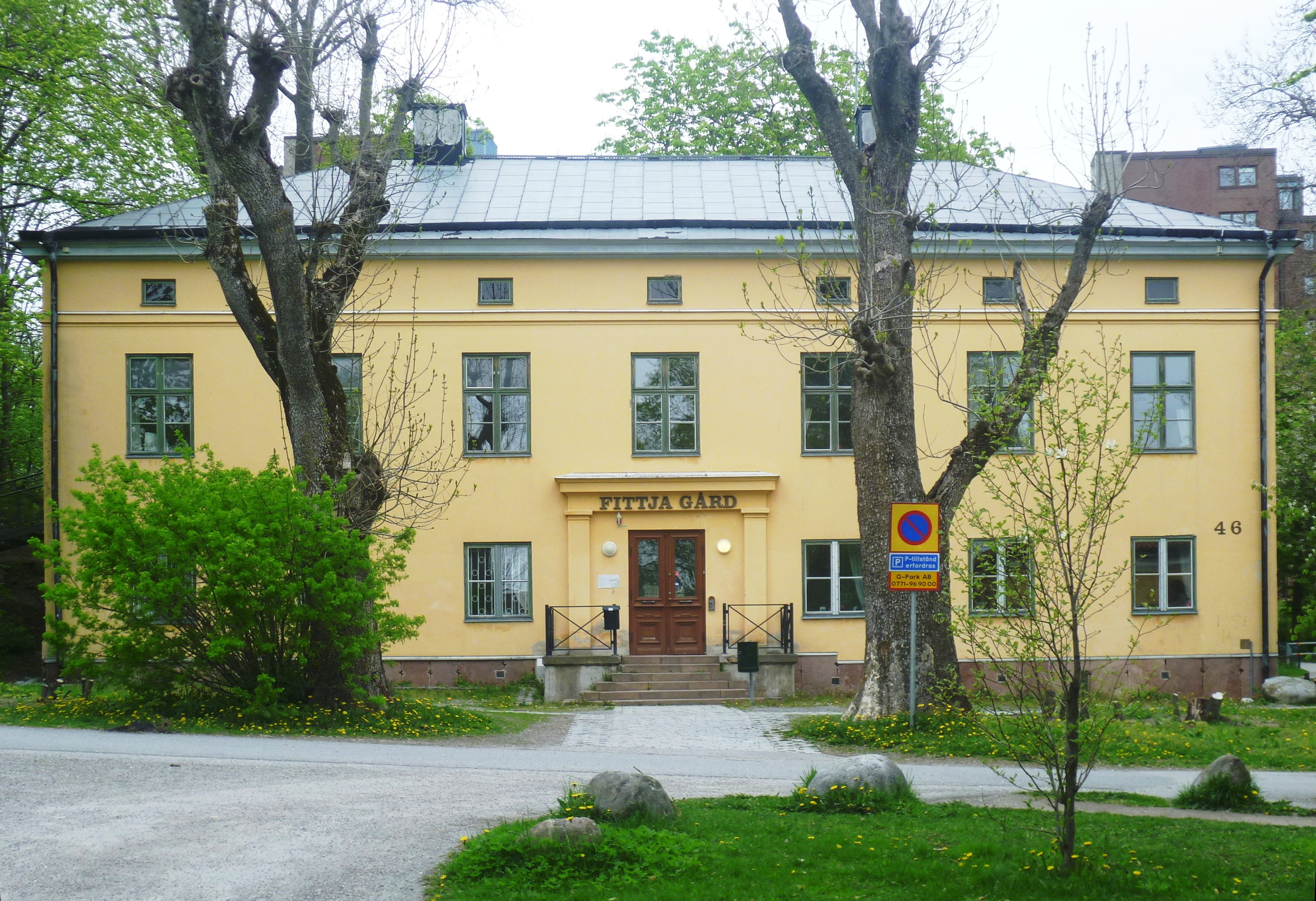
Fittja gård 2012

Since 1987, the buildings have been used as a mångkulturellt centrum (multicultural centre): a research centre focusing on the branch of anthropology dealing with the scientific description of individual cultures. It is a museum for the historical study of Swedish migration-related events, with one of Sweden's largest libraries in the field. In May 2014, the first UNESCO Local Centre for Collaboration in northern Europe was established in the main building. The remaining stretch of Värdshusvägen east of the buildings is now a pedestrian and bicycle path.
