= Vita villorna =

- Village
- Location in Stockholm County
- Coordinates: 59°12′31″N 17°52′19″E
- Country: Sweden
- County: Stockholm County
- Municipality: Botkyrka Municipality

Population (2005)
  - Total: 185
- Time zone: UTC+1 (CET)
  - Summer (DST): UTC+2 (CEST)

Vita villorna (White Villas) is a village in Botkyrka Municipality, Stockholm County, southeastern Sweden. According to the 2005 census it had a population of 185 people. The houses were built as workers' houses in the late 1800s for a foundry named Separator AB.
