= Norrbyvret =

- Village
- Location in Stockholm County
- Coordinates: 59°11′14″N 17°46′46″E
- Country: Sweden
- County: Stockholm County
- Municipality: Botkyrka Municipality

Population (2005)
  - Total: 75
- Time zone: UTC+1 (CET)
  - Summer (DST): UTC+2 (CEST)

Norrbyvret is a village in Botkyrka Municipality, Stockholm County, southeastern Sweden. According to the 2005 census it had a population of 75 people.
