= Östra Bröta Nature Reserve =

Nature reserve in Stockholm, Sweden

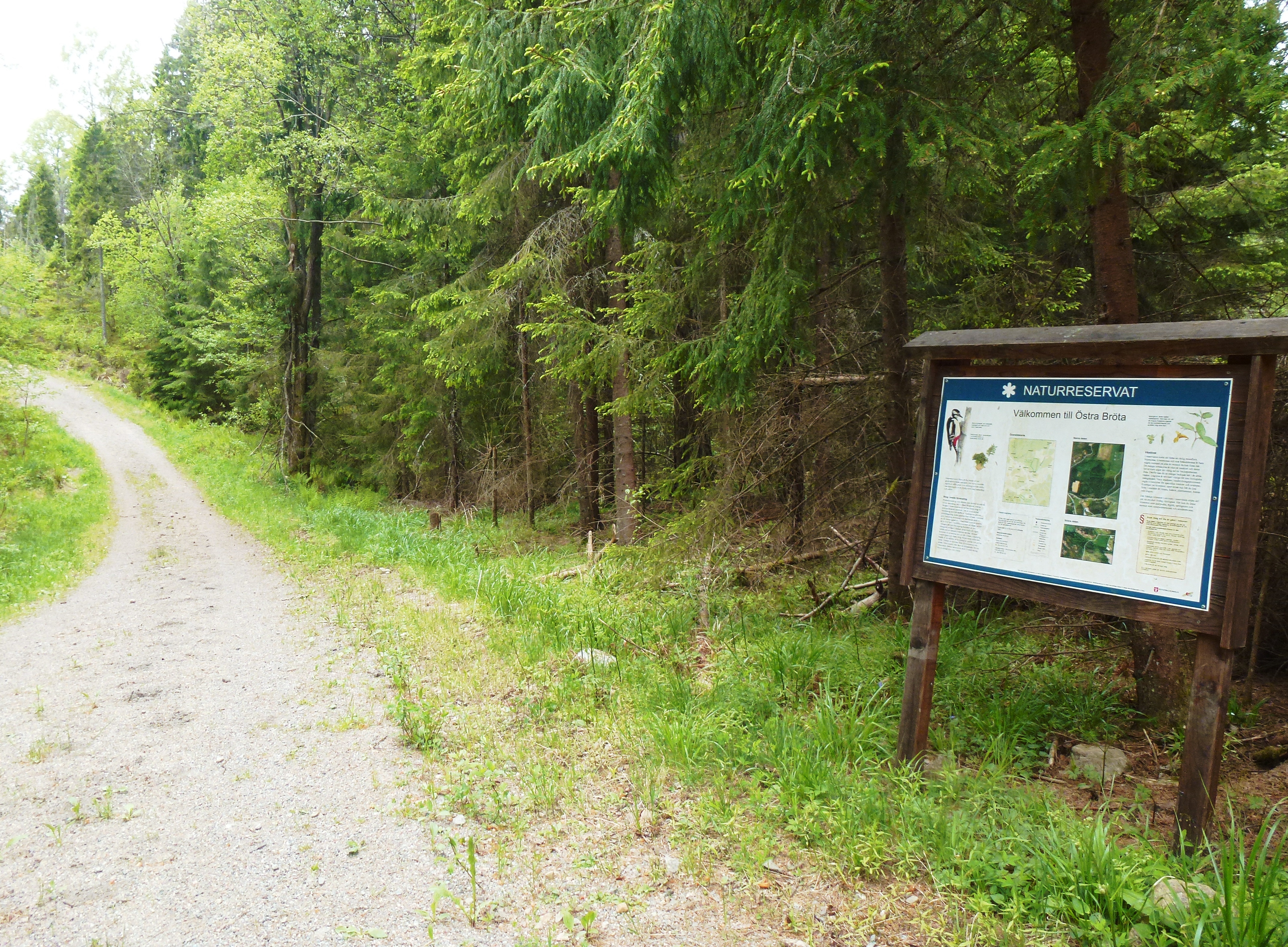

- Location within Stockholm
- Location: Sweden
- Nearest city: Stockholm
- Coordinates: 59°06′36″N 17°53′00″E

Östra Bröta Nature Reserve is a nature reserve in Botkyrka Municipality close to Stockholm, Sweden.

The nature reserve consists of two parts, an area of woodland consisting of old-growth pine and spruce forest, and a small ravine surrounded by marshy woodland. It contains several red-listed species of moss and the old-growth forest is one of relatively few remaining such woods in the area.
