= Fittja Mosque =

Mosque in Fittja, Botkyrka, Sweden

- Fittja moské
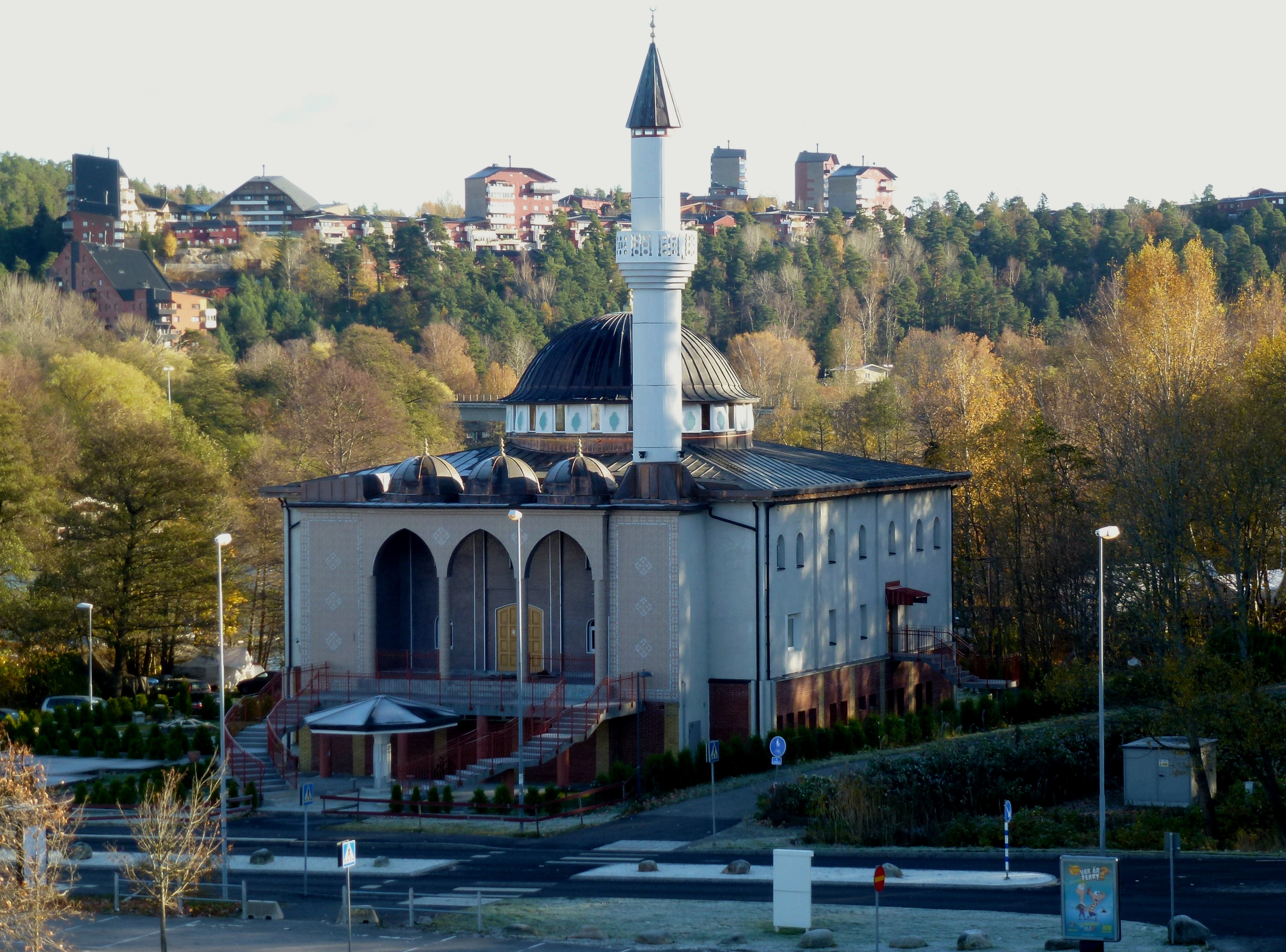

- Location within Stockholm

Religion
- Affiliation: Islam
- Branch/tradition: Sunni
- Ownership: Turkish Islamic Association

Location
- Location: Fittja, Botkyrka, Stockholm, Sweden
- Interactive map of Fittja Mosque
- Coordinates: 59°15′04.3″N 17°52′04.7″E

Architecture
- Type: Mosque
- Style: Turkish
- Groundbreaking: 1998
- Completed: 2007

Specifications
- Minaret: 1
- Minaret height: 32.5 m

The Fittja Mosque (Swedish: Fittja moské) is a mosque in Fittja, Botkyrka Municipality, Stockholm County, Sweden. It was constructed with Turkish-style architecture.

The mosque, which began to be constructed in 1998 and was completed in April 2007, is owned by the Islamic Cultural Association in Botkyrka, a mainly Turkish association with more than 1,500 members. The mosque is built in Turkish-style architecture, with a windowed mid-dome with birch wood panel and hand-painted tiles that cover the walls of the prayer room. The mosque minaret is 32.5 meters high. In the central prayer room, the women have their place of prayer on a 200 square meter high stand. The mosque also houses the residence of the imam of the assembly.

In February 2013, the Botkyrka Islamic Cultural Association filed an application to the police to begin broadcasting the prayer calls from the Fittja Mosque. Since this is about repeated audio broadcast in public places, the case was with the police. According to the Islamic Society in Botkyrka, their request was for a short prayer call of 2–3 minutes, once a week, not five times a day as normal in Muslim-majority countries. In April 2013, the police authority issued a time-limited license, which was valid until March 20, 2014. The conditions for the permit were that the speakers, placed at the height of the balcony on the outside of the minaret, were to be directed only to three weather lines and that the noise level did not exceed 60 decibels.

On April 26, 2013, at 12:57, it was the first time in Sweden that a prayer call from a minaret could be heard. This was performed live, not via a recording, by the imam Ergin Öcgem through the microphone and the minaret speaker.

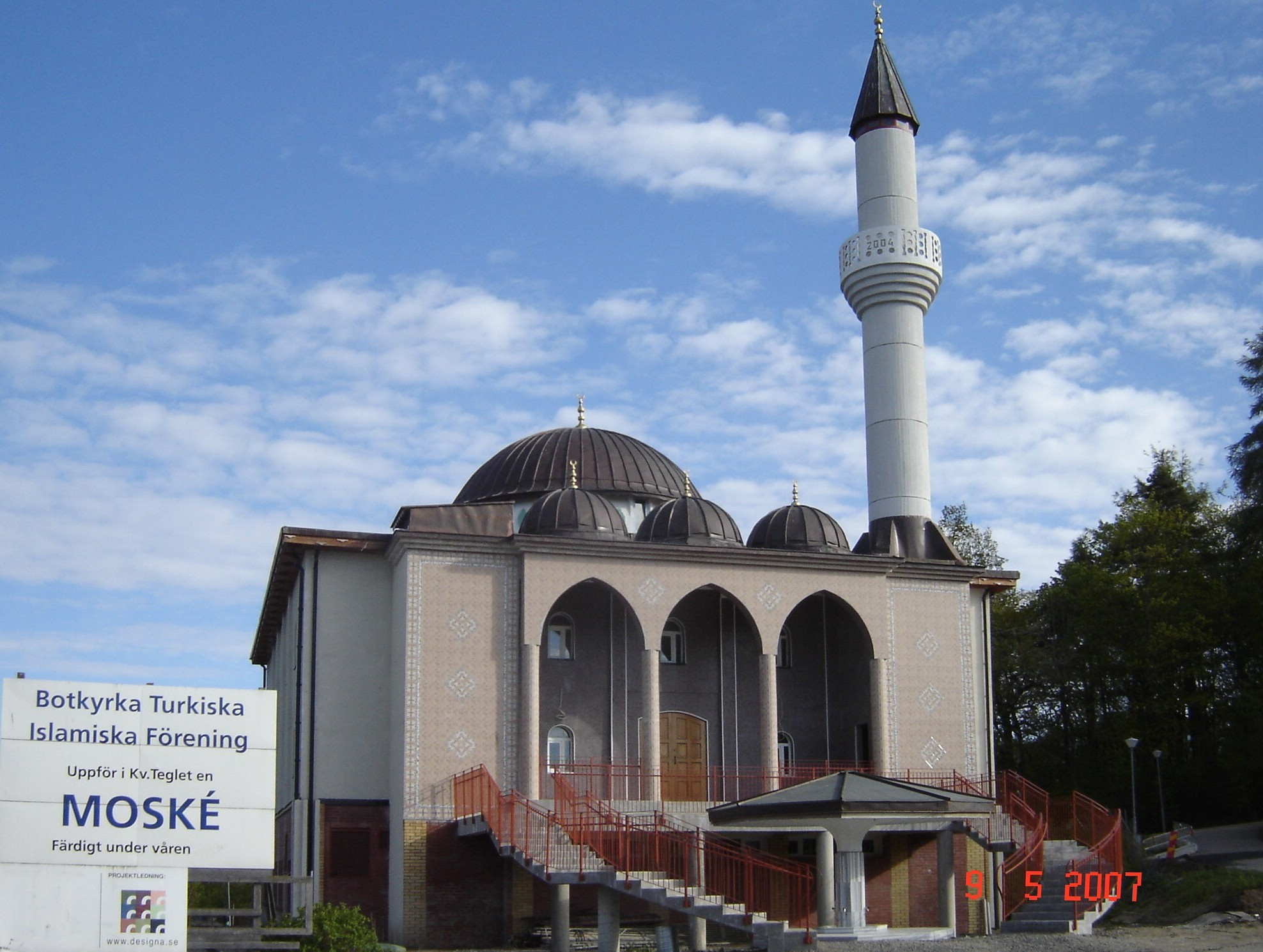
Mosque in May 2007

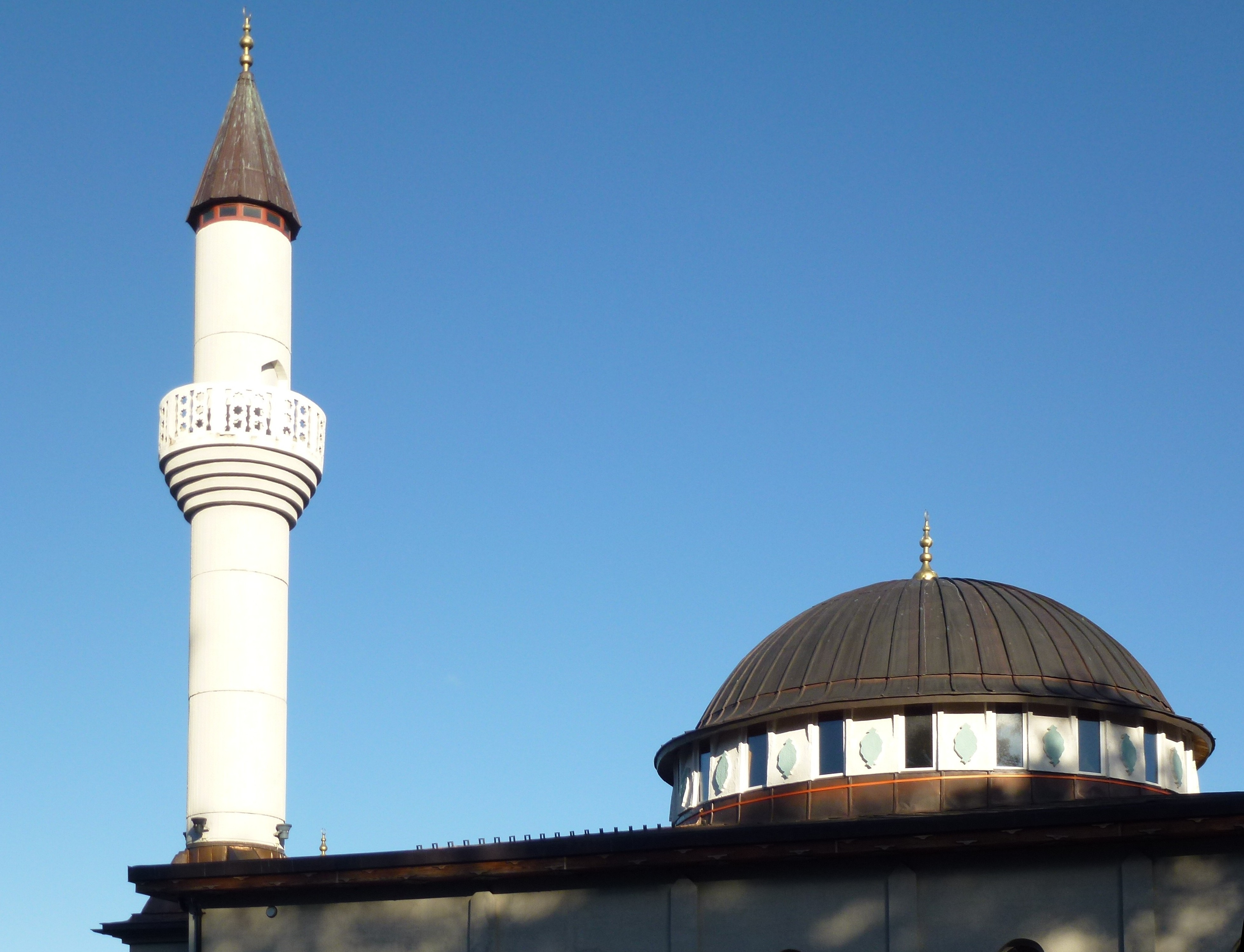
Minaret and dome

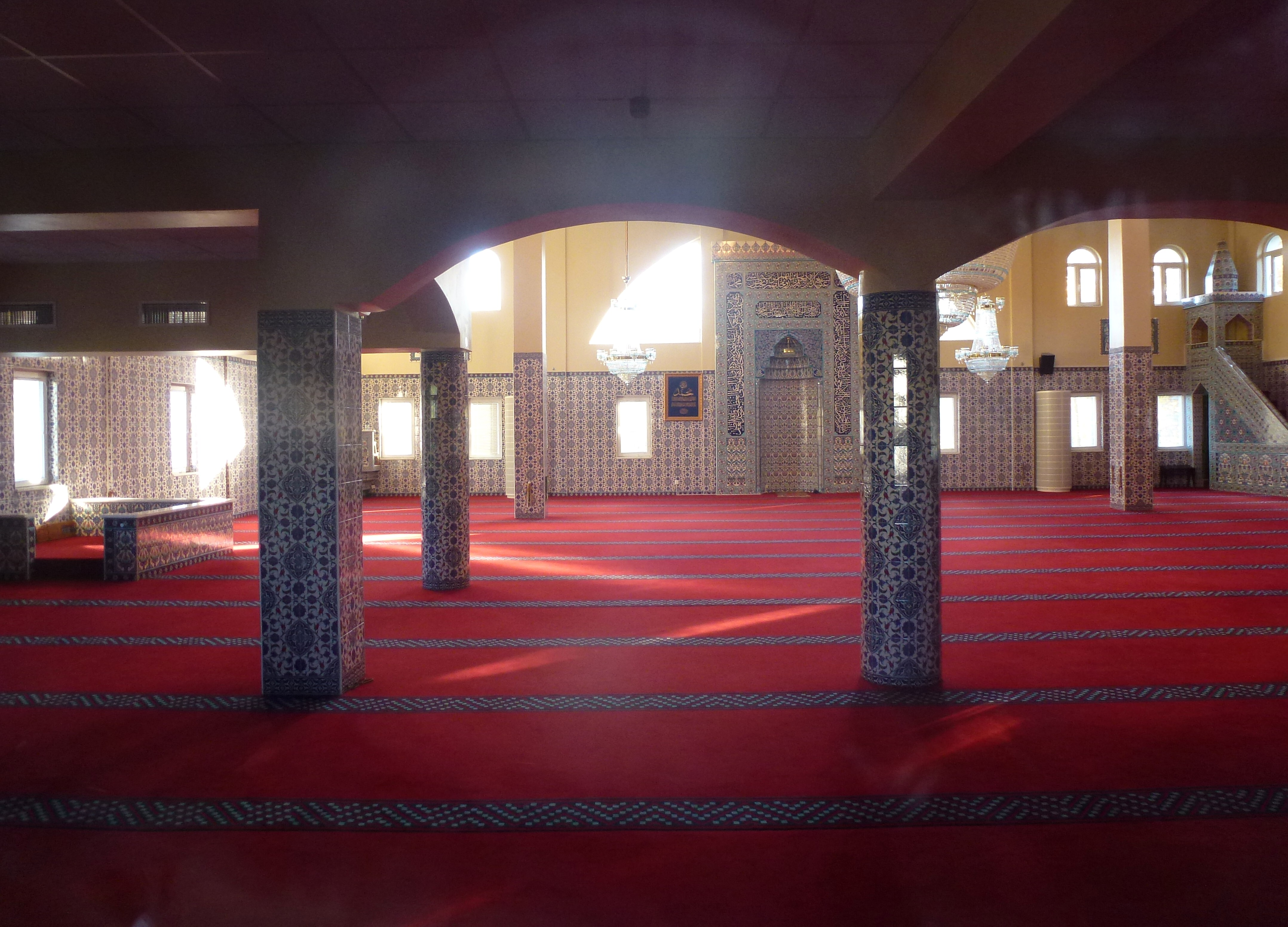
Prayer hall

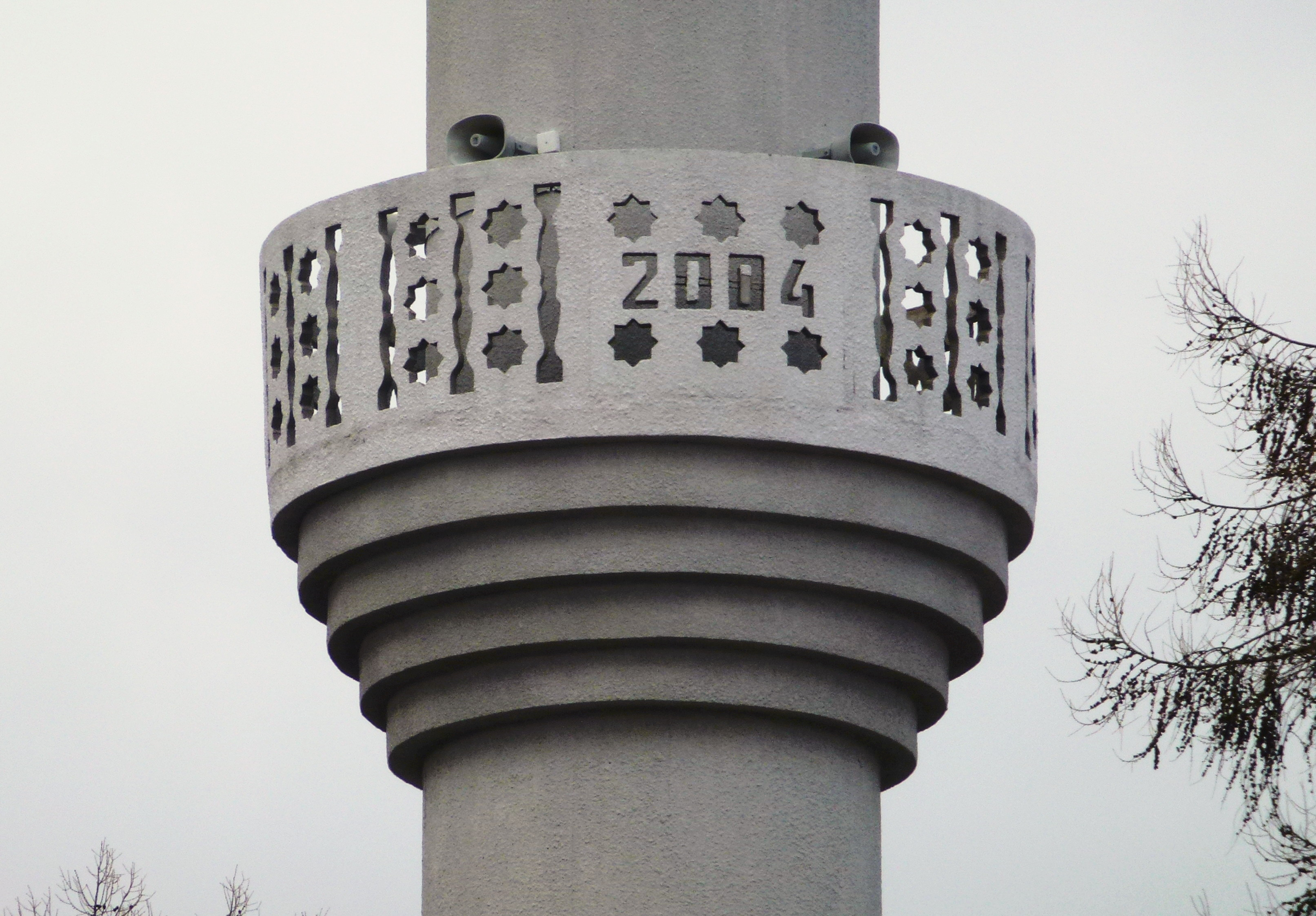
Minaret (detail)

== See also ==
- Islam in Sweden
