= Slagsta =

- Residential district
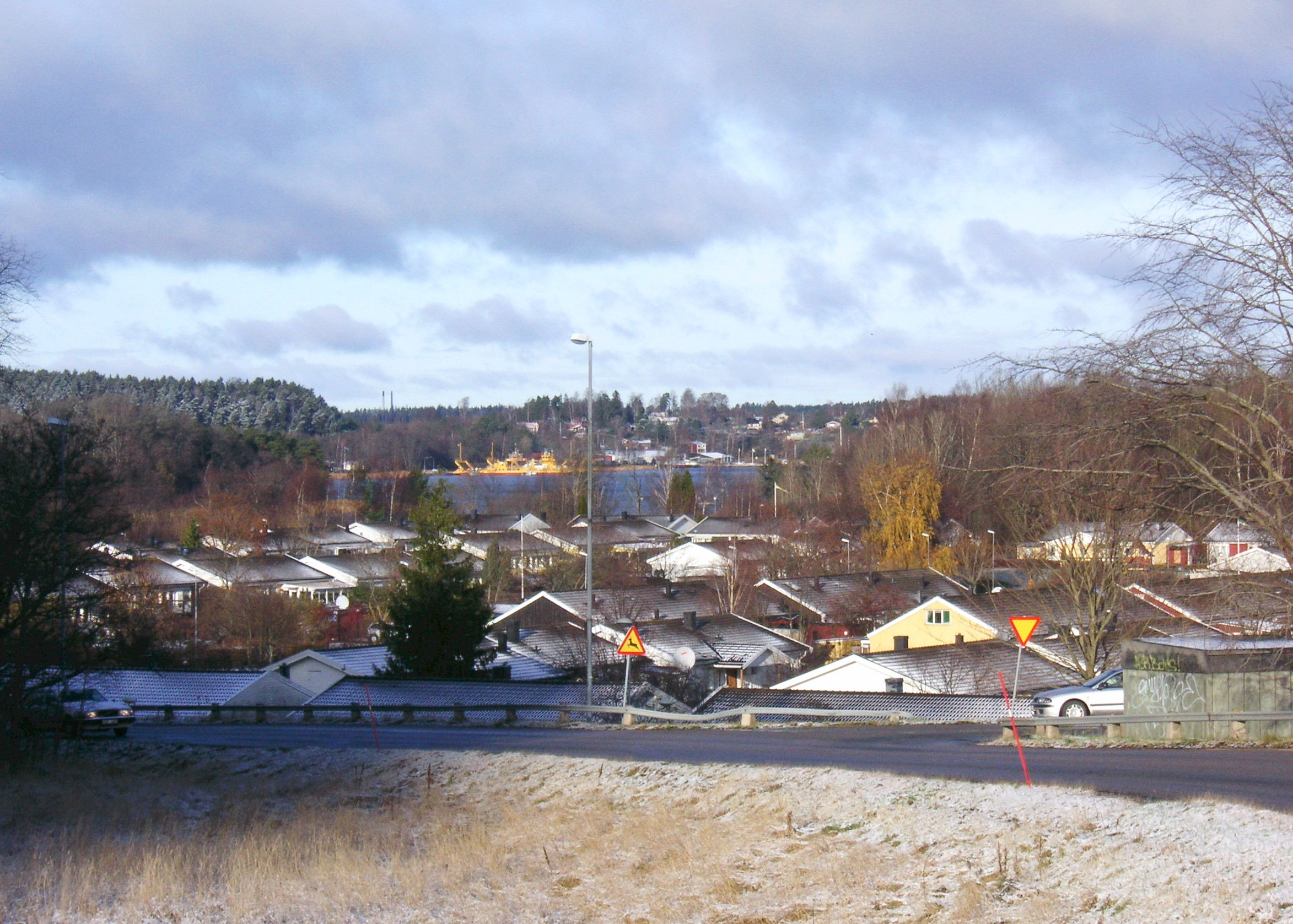

- Location in Stockholm County
- Coordinates: 59°15′14″N 17°50′43″E
- Country: Sweden
- County: Stockholm County
- Municipality: Botkyrka Municipality
- Time zone: UTC+1 (CET)
  - Summer (DST): UTC+2 (CEST)

Slagsta is a municipal district and a residential area of Botkyrka Municipality, Stockholm County, southeastern Sweden. It is located between the E4 south and part of Lake Mälaren in the north. The area is named after Slagsta farm.

== Gallery ==
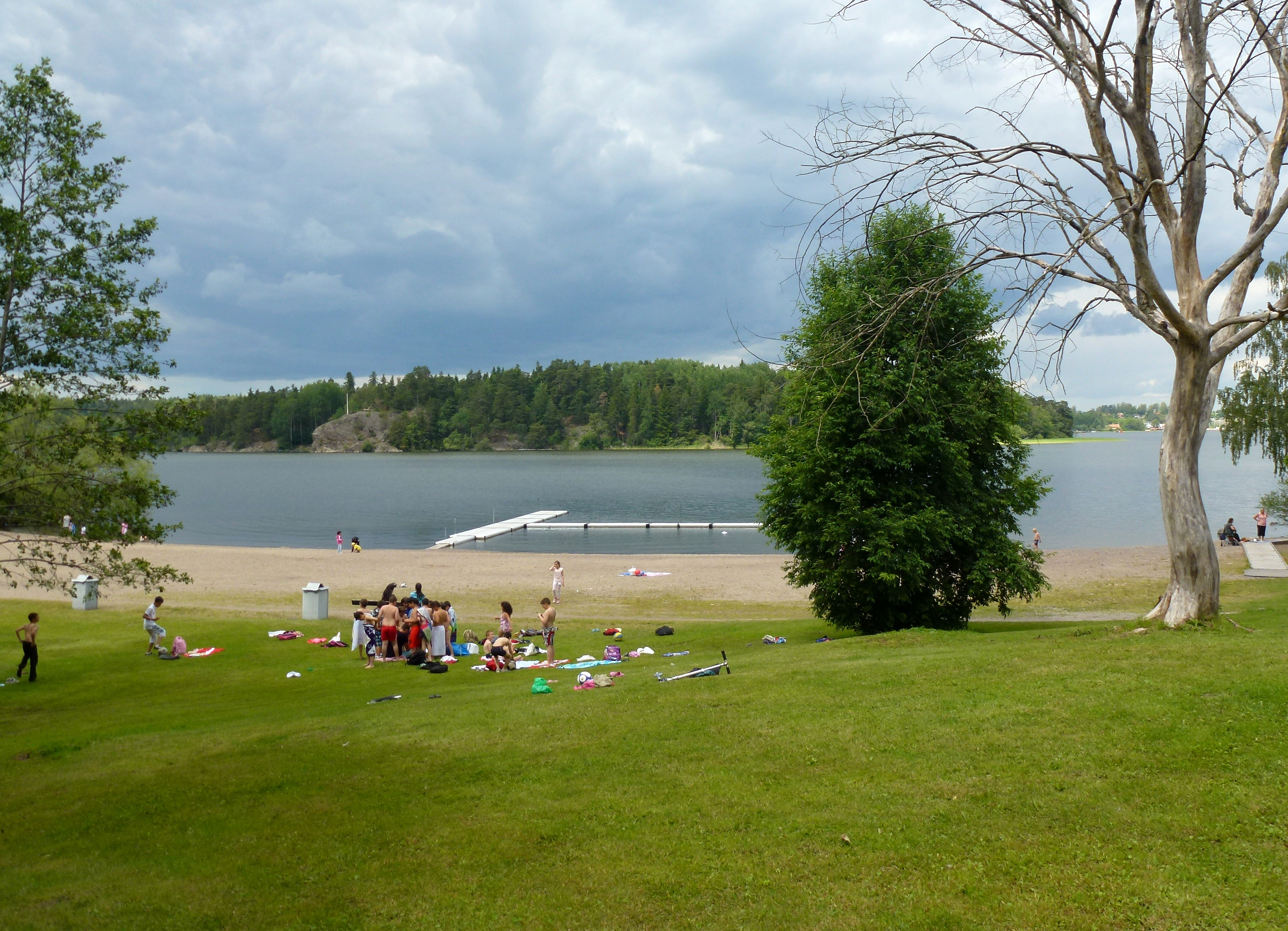
Slagstabadet

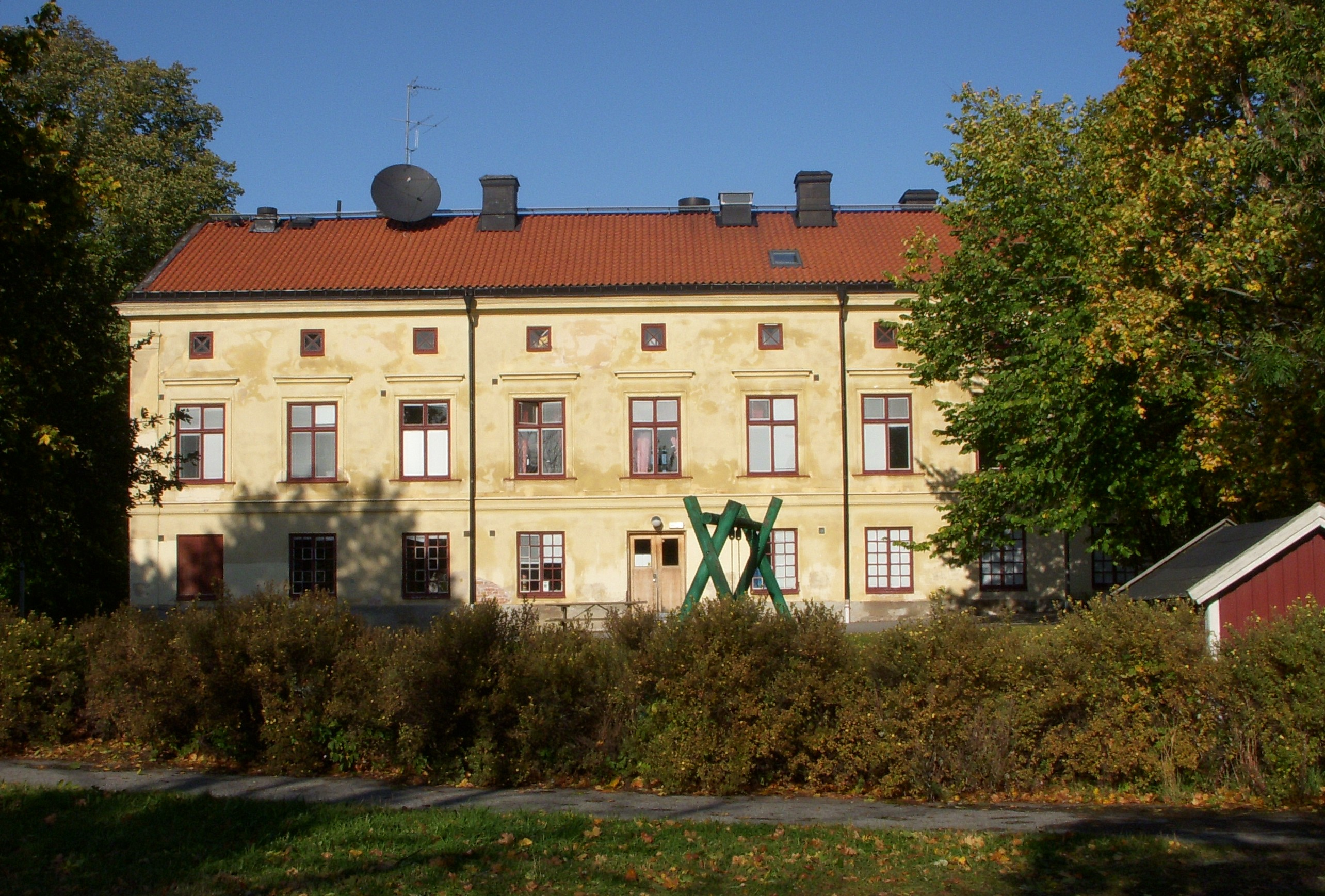
Slagsta gård

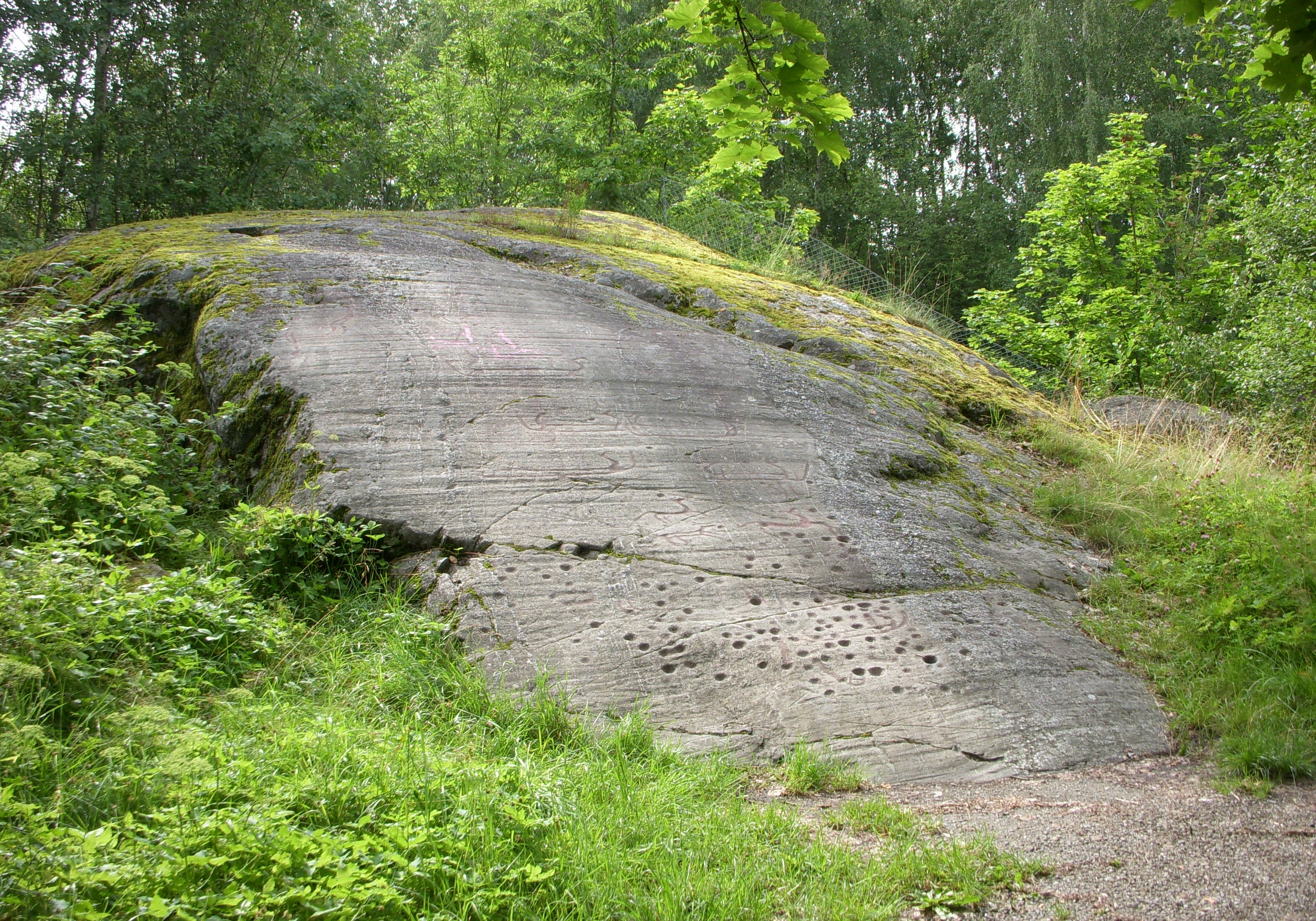
Slagsta hällristning
