= Vårsta =

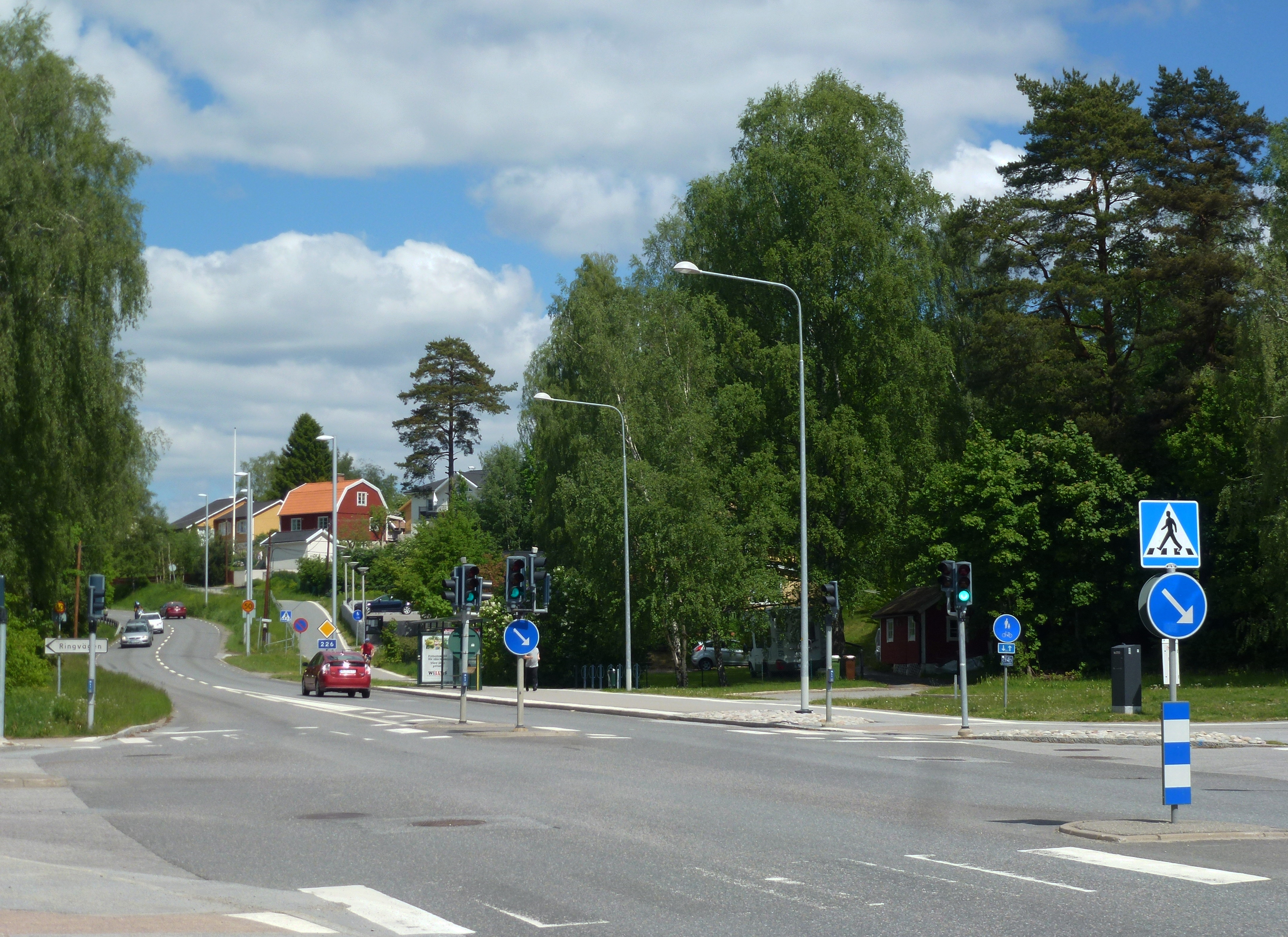
- Vårsta, 2014

- Location within Stockholm Location within Sweden Location within European Union
- Coordinates: 59°10′N 17°48′E
- Country: Sweden
- Province: Södermanland
- County: Stockholm County
- Municipality: Botkyrka Municipality

Area
  - Total: 1.33 km^{2} (0.51 sq mi)

Population (31 December 2010)
  - Total: 2,396
  - Density: 1,806/km^{2} (4,680/sq mi)
- Time zone: UTC+1 (CET)
  - Summer (DST): UTC+2 (CEST)

Vårsta is a suburb of Greater Stockholm and a locality situated in Botkyrka Municipality, Stockholm County, Sweden with 2,396 inhabitants in 2010.
