= Fittja =

Urban area in Botkyrka Municipality, Sweden

Coordinates: 59°14′50″N 17°51′37″E

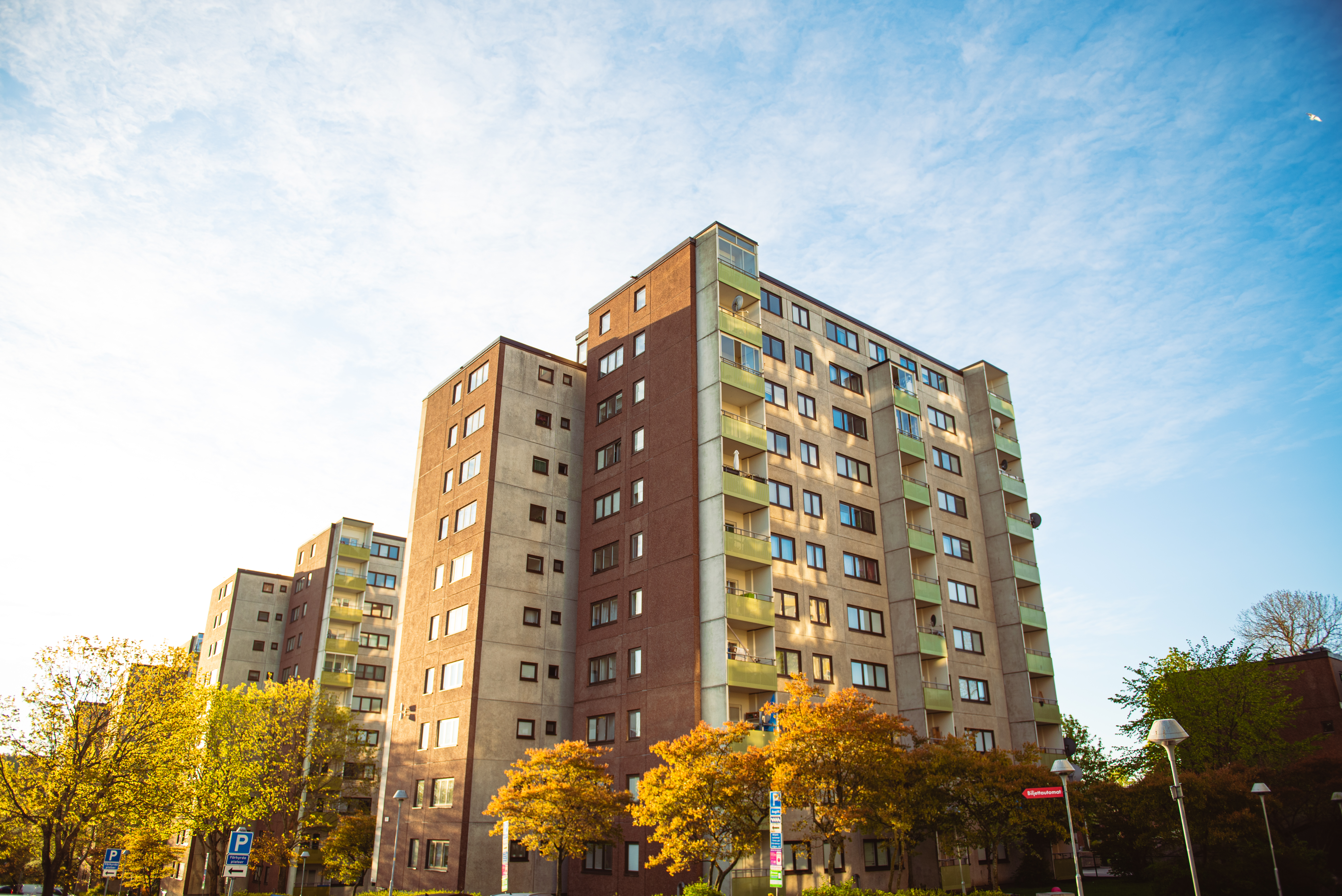
Fittja in 2020

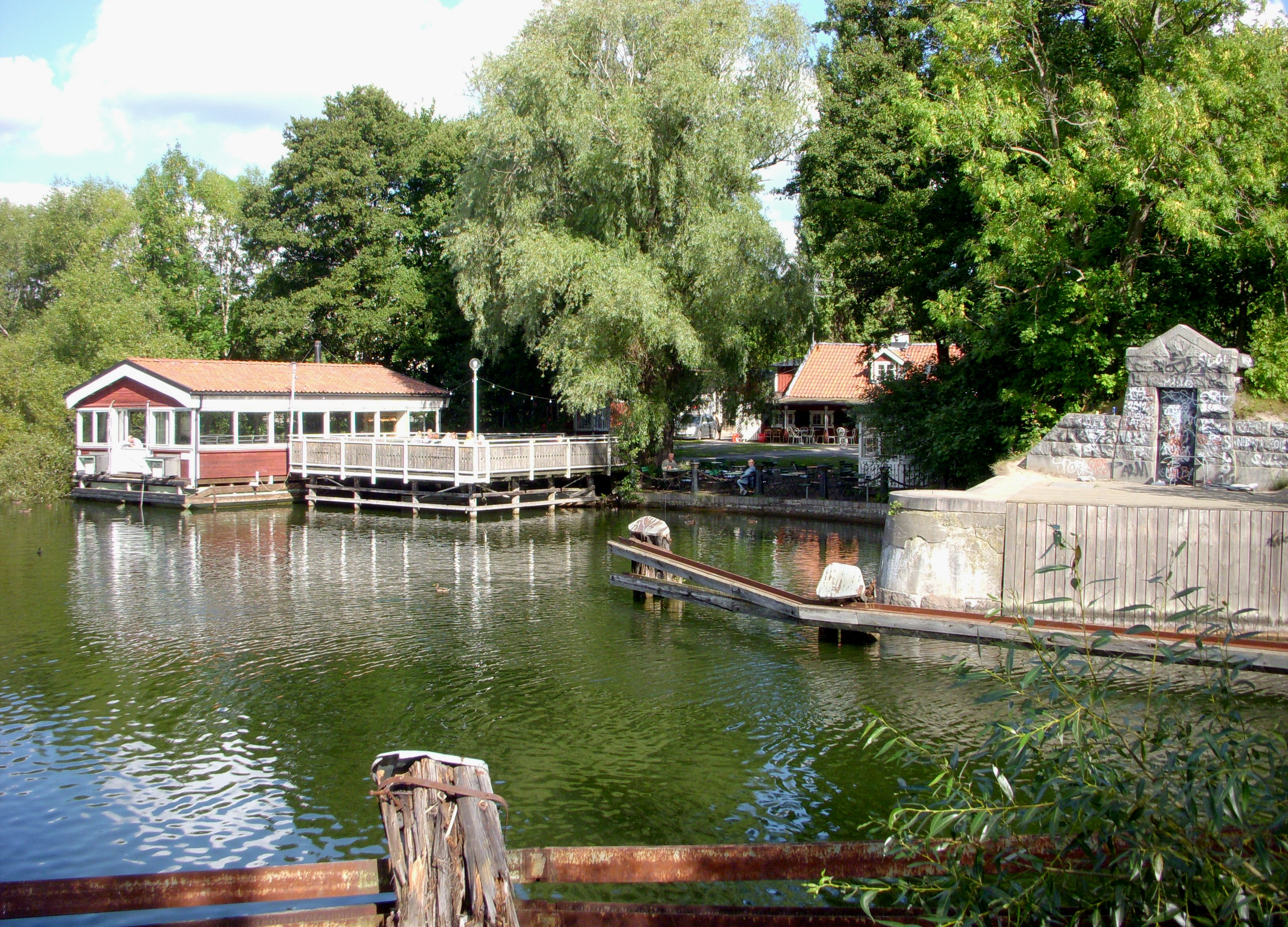
Fittja bridge, 2010

Fittja is a part of Botkyrka Municipality and the name of the Stockholm Metro station in the area. It was settled during the 1970s and consists mostly of rental apartments.

== History ==
The Fittja area originally belonged to the Church. Following the Reformation, the properties were transferred to the Crown (the Swedish state), and the people who farmed the land became Crown tenants. The 17th century was a period of considerable activity, during which a new road route to Stockholm was built through Fittja. It was also during this period that the coaching inn on the narrow strip of land between Lake Albysjön and Lake Mälaren opened.

Fittja also became an important centre for civil administration and the judicial system. From the late 17th century onwards, local court hearings were held in one of the wings of Fittja Manor. The largest room in the building served as a courtroom for many decades. Today, the street names bear witness to this bygone era. Fittja is also home to the Multicultural Centre (Mångkulturellt Centrum). During the early 1970s, the area was developed, primarily with rental apartment buildings, along with a town centre and a metro station.

In its 2017 report, Police in Sweden placed the Alby/Fittja district in the especially vulnerable area category.

=== Demographics ===
As of 2008, there were 7,458 people living in Fittja; 64.7% of them were of non-Swedish origin, of whom 25.1% were non-Swedish citizens.In 1990, 55.1% of Fittja was foreign born. 84% of Fittja had a foreign background in 1997, rising to 89.9% in 2008, and 92.4% in 2024.

== Fittja gård ==
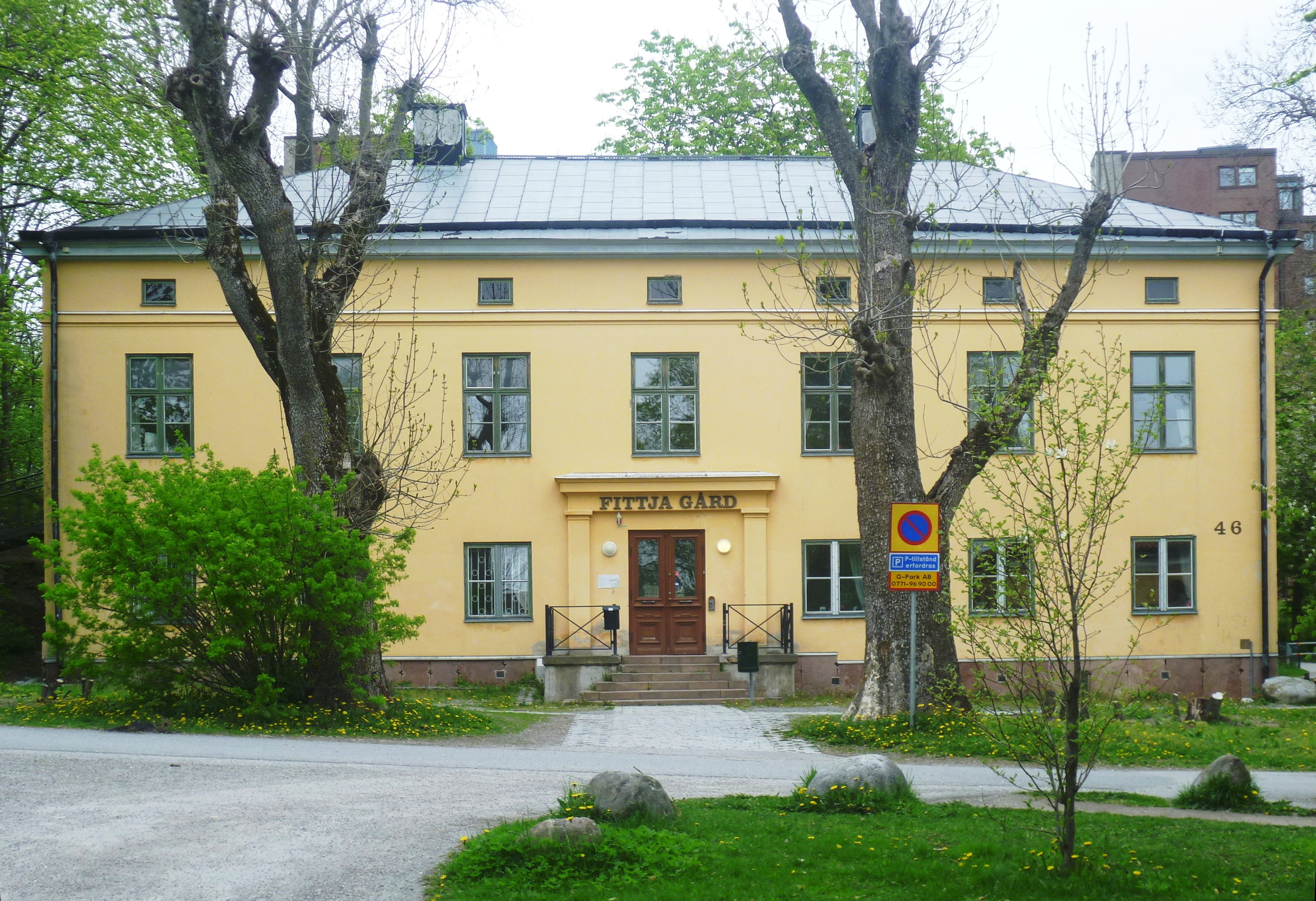
Fittja gård

The 17th century was a period of prosperity for Fittja, largely thanks to the new highway running south from Stockholm (Södertäljevägen, later known as Riksettan/Riksväg 1, now European route E4). In 1663, alderman Gustav Mattsson was granted a royal privilege to establish a "good inn" for the benefit of travellers. The innkeeper was responsible for looking after travellers, arranging horse changes and handling mail delivery.

Among the travellers who spent the night at Fittja Inn or waited there for transportation were Charles XII of Sweden, Oscar I of Sweden and Carl Linnaeus. The poets Johan Runius and Carl Michael Bellman were among those who wrote about the inn and its activities.

Today, the former coaching inn houses the Multicultural Centre (Swedish: Mångkulturellt centrum). The Multicultural Centre was founded in 1987 and collaborates with Södertörn University, Stockholm University and the Nordic Museum. Its activities include research, documentation, education and exhibitions.

== Metro station ==
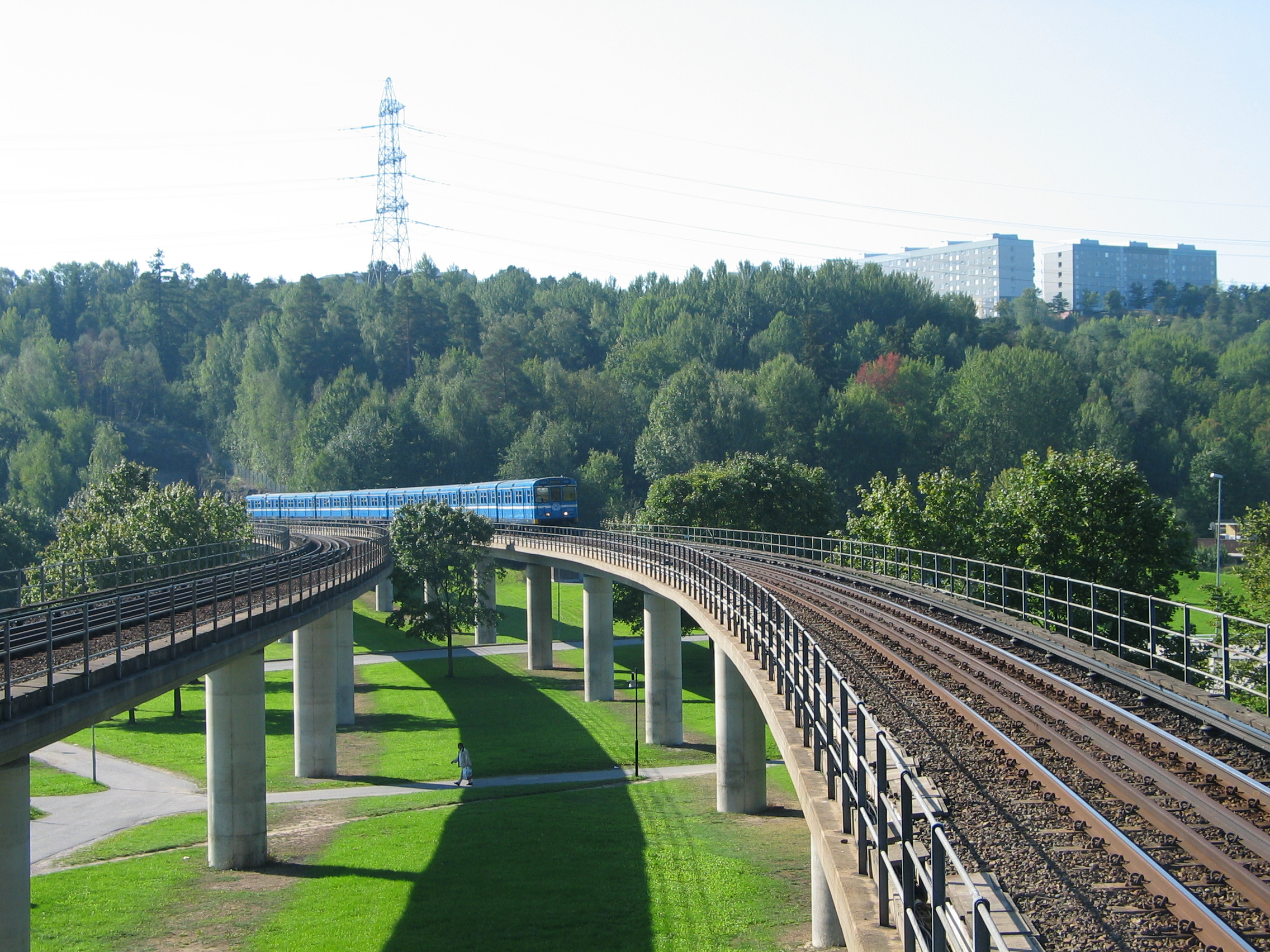
Viadukt at Alby

Fittja metro station is served by Line 13 of the Stockholm Metro (the Red Line) and opened on 1 October 1972. The distance from Slussen is 17.5 kilometres. It is an open-air station located next to Fittja Centre, consisting of a single outdoor platform. It has a ticket hall.

Artwork: The Knotted Gun by Carl Fredrik Reuterswärd, 1998. A copy of Carl Fredrik Reuterswärd's sculpture The Knotted Gun is located at Fittja metro station.

== Town centre ==
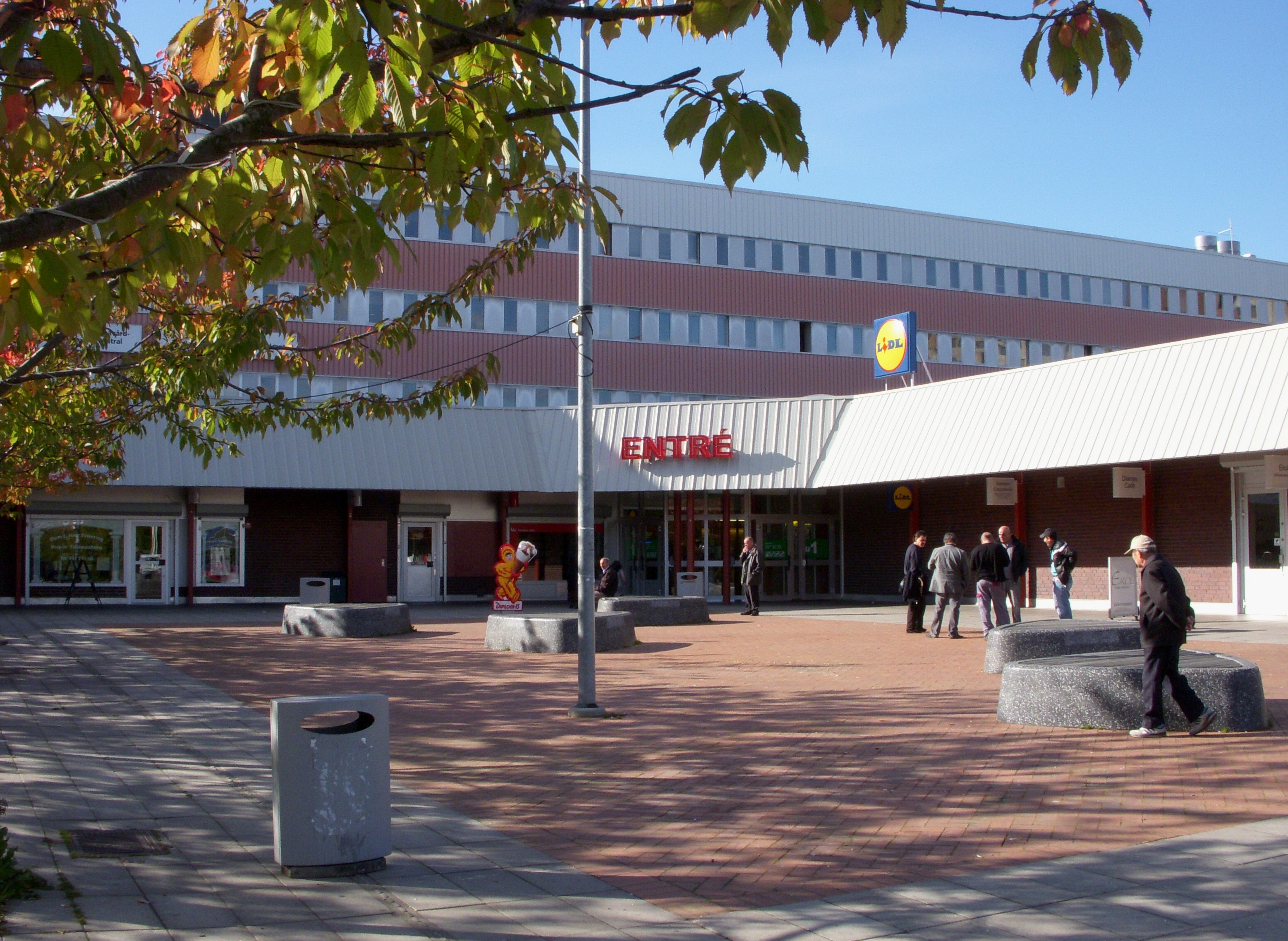
Fittja centre, 2010

Fittja's town centre is housed in a large building complex that was constructed in the 1970s, alongside the surrounding buildings. The centre underwent a major renovation in the 1990s. It contains shops and a library. Within walking distance are a primary care clinic, a pharmacy and two grocery stores.

== Gallery ==
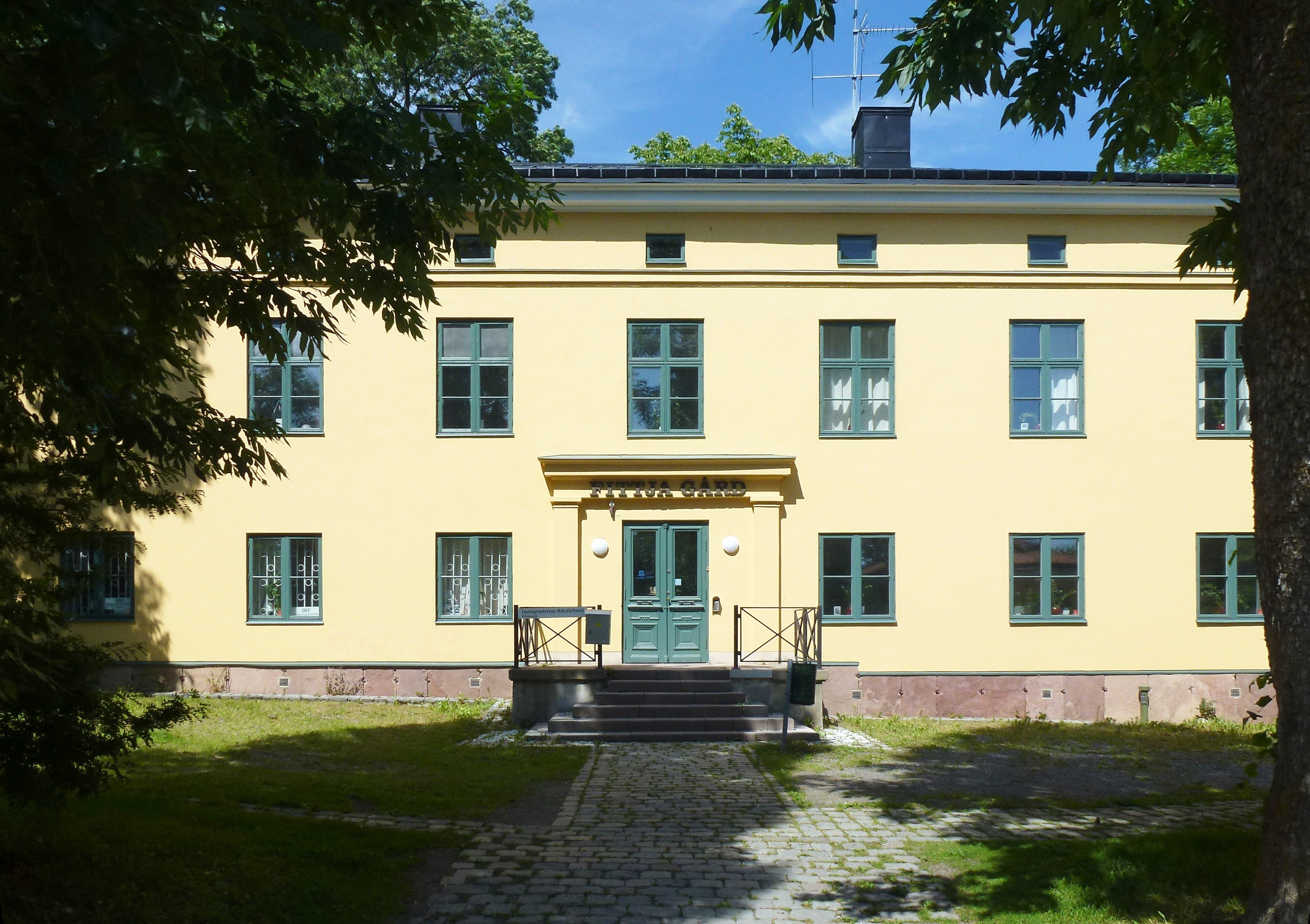
Fittja gård, 2014

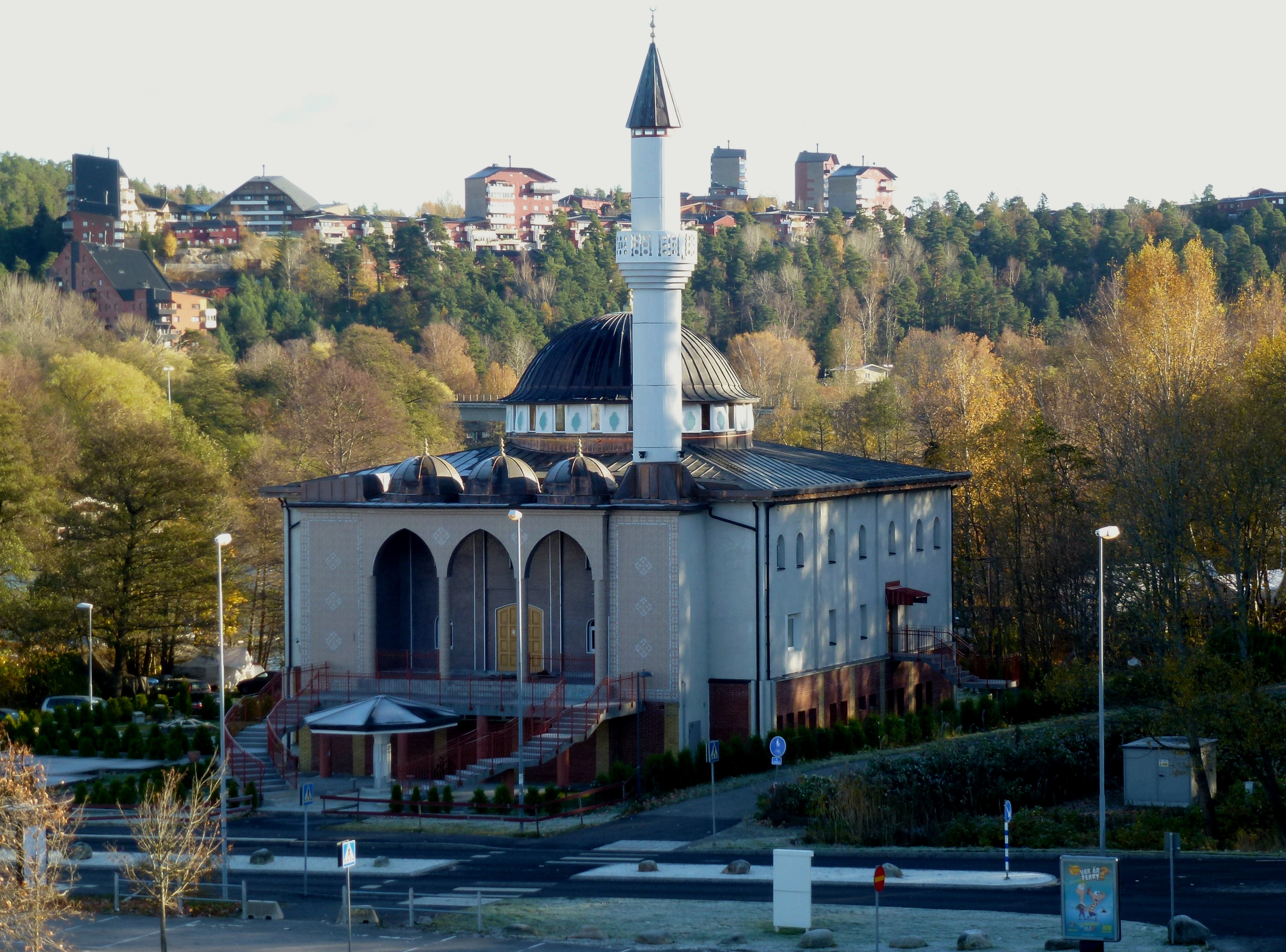
Fittja Mosque

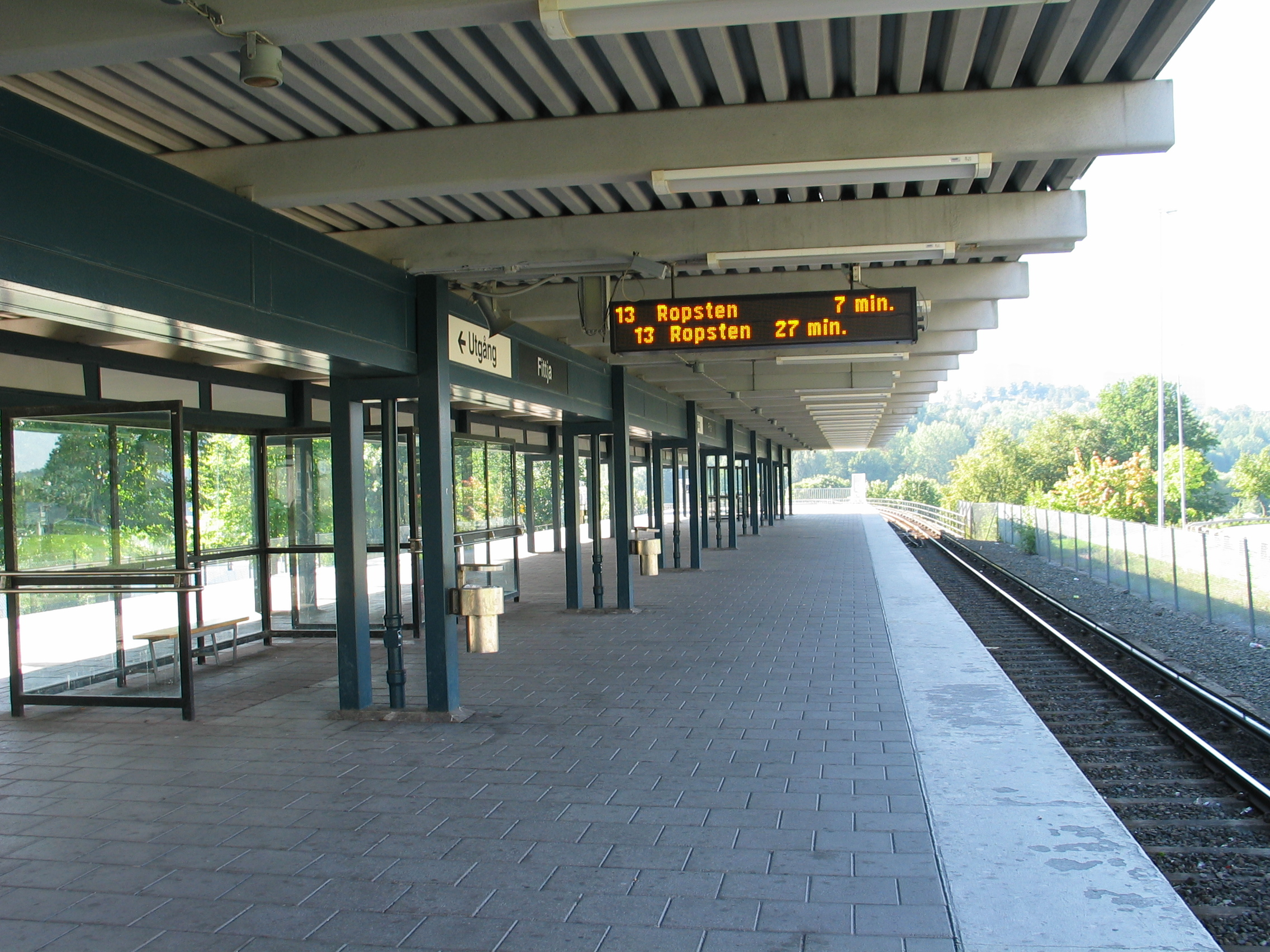
Platform at the station
