= Botkyrka Municipality =

Botkyrka Municipality Botkyrka kommun
- Municipality
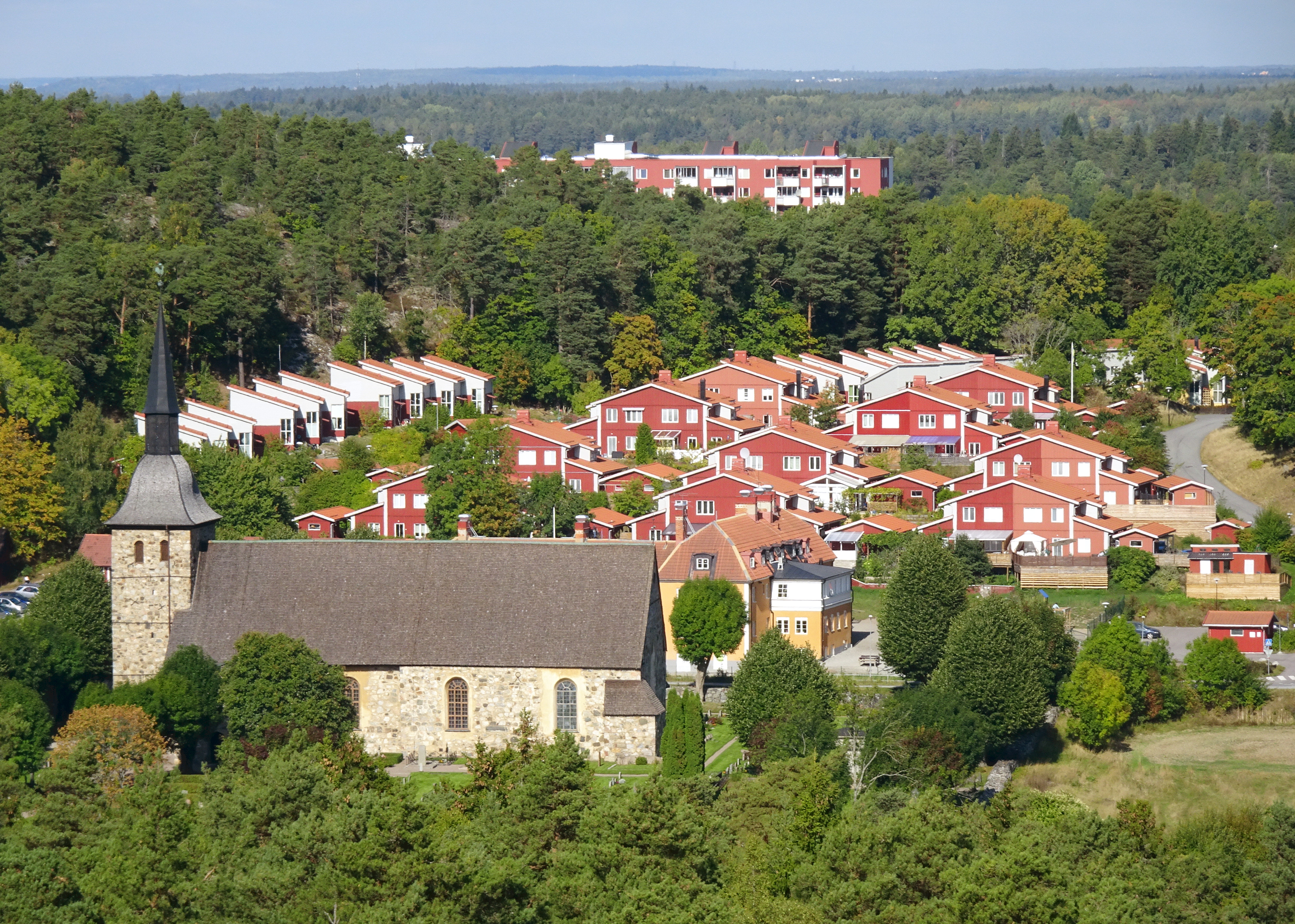

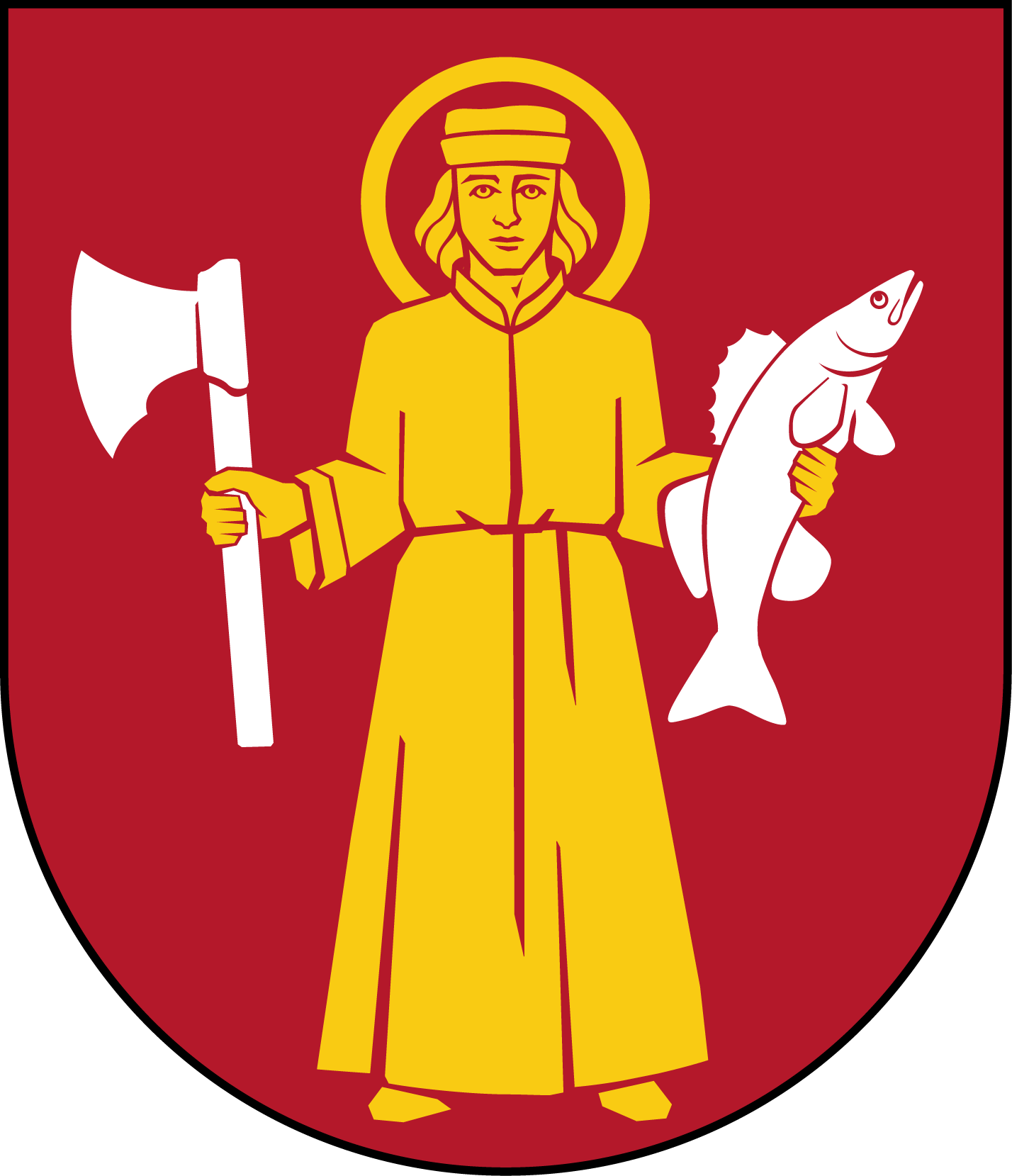
- Coat of arms Logotype

- Coordinates: 59°12′N 17°49′E
- Country: Sweden
- County: Stockholm County
- Seat: Tumba

Area
  - Total: 222.32 km^{2} (85.84 sq mi)
  - Land: 194.17 km^{2} (74.97 sq mi)
  - Water: 28.15 km^{2} (10.87 sq mi)
- Area as of 1 January 2014.

Population (30 June 2025)
  - Total: 96,062
  - Density: 494.73/km^{2} (1,281.3/sq mi)
- Demonyms: Botkyrkan
- Time zone: UTC+1 (CET)
  - Summer (DST): UTC+2 (CEST)
- ISO 3166 code: SE
- Province: Södermanland
- Municipal code: 0127
- Website: www.botkyrka.se
- Density is calculated using land area only.

Botkyrka Municipality (Botkyrka kommun) is a municipality in Stockholm County in east central Sweden, not far from the capital Stockholm. Its seat is located in the town of Tumba.

In 1971 Grödinge was merged with Botkyrka and in 1974 Salem was added. The Salem part was split off again in 1983, and a new Salem Municipality was formed.

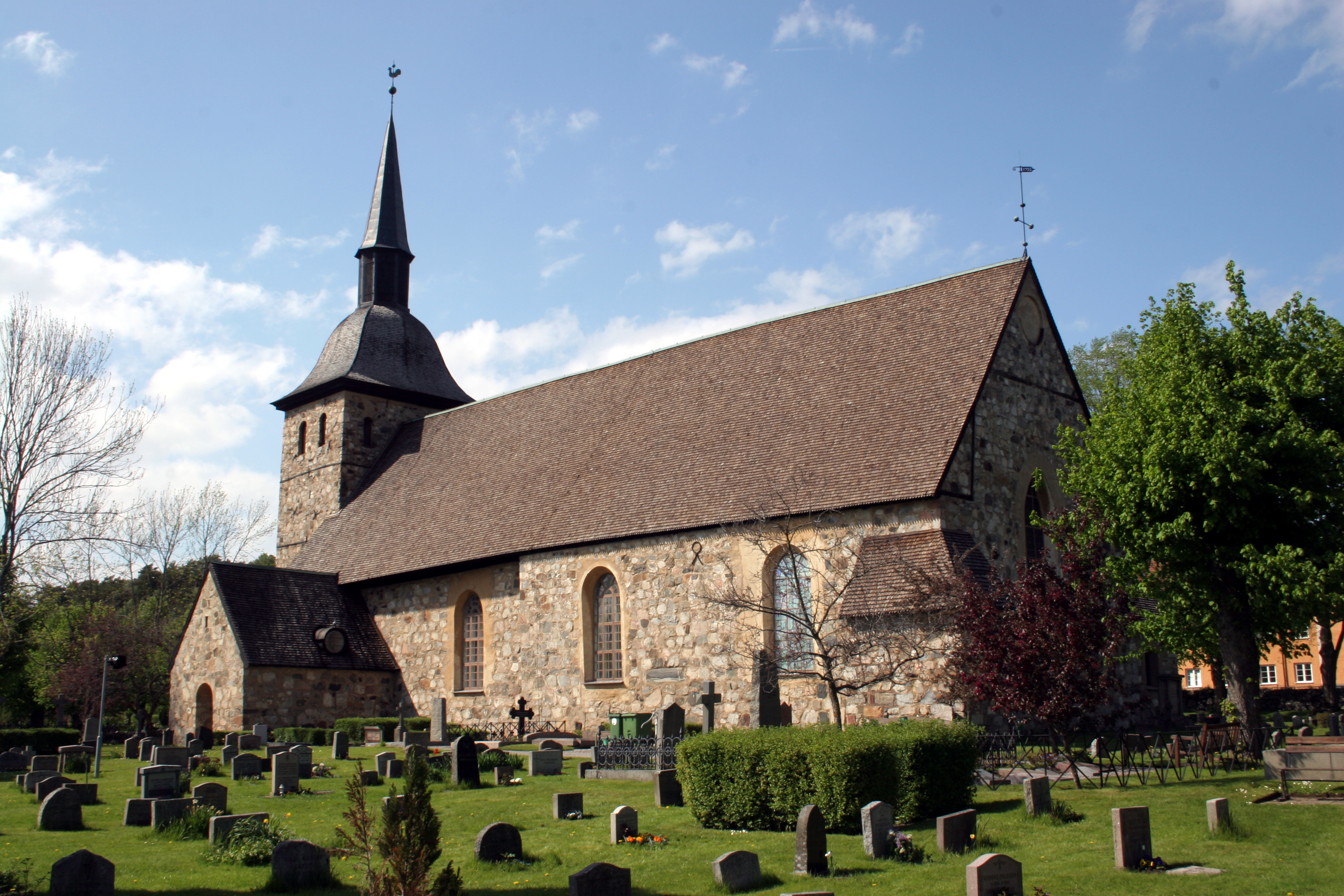
Botkyrka church

== History ==
The municipality is named after Saint Botvid, a Christian missionary during the 12th century. Saint Botvid is shown on the seal and coat of arms of Botkyrka Municipality, where he carries an axe and a fish. Another remnant of Botkyrka's Christian medieval history is the Botkyrka church, made of stone.

Politically the municipality is primarily Social Democratic, that has governed Botkyrka for a long period except 3 years in the early 1990s. However, with fewer seats the party now governs together with The Green Party, and The Left Party. There have also been several local parties. For a long period a local party called Botkyrkapartiet (The Botkyrka Party) has held several seats. A party was also active from mid 1980s to mid 1990s with only one purpose - to prevent the exploitation of the small airfield, F18, in Tullinge to become a commercial airport in the 1980s. In the election 2010 a local party for the area of Tullinge got 6 seats on the agenda of separating Tullinge from Botkyrka as a separate municipality.

Botkyrka has two local, weekly, newspapers called "Mitt i Botkyrka" (Middle of Botkyrka) and "Södra Sidan" (South side). They are delivered free of charge to all households.

The Swedish hip hop group The Latin Kings raps about life in Botkyrka in several of their songs.

In its December 2015 report, Police in Sweden placed the Hallunda and Norsborg districts in the most severe category of urban areas with high crime rates. In its 2017 report, Police in Sweden added the Alby and Fittja districts to the category. In 2023 Storvreten was added to the list as well.

=== Battle of Botkyrka ===
On 31 August 1568, a battle between John III, Duke Charles, and Eric XIV took place in Botkyrka. Despite his inferior forces, the battle resulted in a victory for Eric XIV's army, and forced John and Charles to flee.

== Demographics ==
The northern and eastern parts of the municipality are in the contiguous Stockholm urban area. Tumba forms a locality (tätort) of its own (which partly is in Salem Municipality). Vårsta is in the central part. The southern half of the municipality is mostly rural.

Population development in Botkyrka Municipality 1970–2019
Year	Population
1970	26,673
1975	57,286
1980	65,218
1985	66,326
1990	68,542
1995	69,500
2000	73,097
2005	76,592
2010	82,608
2015	89,425
2017	91,925
2018	93,106
2019	94,606

=== 2022 population by district ===
This is a demographic table based on Botkyrka Municipality's electoral districts in the 2022 Swedish general election sourced from SVT's election platform, in turn taken from SCB official statistics.

In total there were 95,226 residents, including 61,194 Swedish citizens of voting age resident in the municipality. 51.2% voted for the left coalition and 45.4% for the right coalition. Indicators are in percentage points except population totals and income.

Location	Residents	Citizen adults	Left vote	Right vote	Employed	Swedish parents	Foreign heritage	Income SEK	Degree
Location			%	%					
Alby småhus Ö	1,660	1,094	54.7	38.9	69	24	76	20,096	33
Albyberget V	1,721	853	74.1	22.9	64	11	89	17,661	28
Albyberget Ö	2,332	1,195	71.6	23.6	64	13	87	18,128	27
Albydalen C	2,199	1,464	69.9	21.3	63	12	88	16,619	26
Albydalen V	2,377	1,409	57.2	34.1	65	16	84	19,253	27
Albydalen Ö	2,528	1,443	71.5	22.3	61	10	90	16,269	28
Banslätt-Römossen	1,760	1,355	56.8	42.5	84	69	31	27,123	51
Broängen	1,649	1,170	46.5	51.0	80	58	42	28,955	41
Eriksberg V	1,856	1,141	49.6	46.1	72	29	71	22,735	34
Eriksberg Ö	2,084	1,299	60.5	34.3	61	27	73	17,674	31
Fittja Forvägen	2,315	1,268	71.9	21.8	64	6	94	16,521	27
Fittja Krögarvägen	1,838	1,078	70.3	18.4	61	6	94	16,341	26
Fittja småhus	1,561	970	72.2	20.8	67	10	90	19,594	28
Fittja Värdshusvägen	1,902	1,078	61.7	26.5	57	10	90	14,921	22
G:a Tullingeberg	1,720	1,216	50.6	47.6	84	66	34	27,686	48
Grödinge Landsbygd	2,019	1,574	33.0	66.4	81	80	20	28,984	31
Hallunda C	2,080	1,072	57.3	36.9	69	13	87	19,243	29
Hallunda/Brunna	2,008	1,057	51.6	45.0	70	14	86	19,662	31
Hallunda/Norsborg	2,025	1,351	46.0	49.5	73	20	80	21,115	28
Kassmyra	1,741	1,200	43.1	55.5	82	58	42	29,591	41
Kulturen Tumba park	1,205	935	49.0	49.5	81	57	43	26,103	41
Kvarnsjön	2,027	1,345	32.6	64.9	85	54	46	28,675	38
N Lanthem	1,116	780	47.2	51.4	86	76	24	37,724	62
Nackdala/Solhöjden	2,095	1,353	45.2	50.7	83	43	57	28,970	47
Norsborg C	2,509	1,460	57.4	36.5	59	10	90	15,669	22
Norsborg småhus	1,558	1,154	34.2	63.3	71	23	77	21,530	32
Norsborg V	2,002	1,194	61.0	32.8	59	10	90	16,054	24
Norsborg Ö	1,986	1,138	60.3	32.8	67	10	90	17,340	25
Riksten	3,030	1,837	44.6	54.0	85	66	34	31,137	53
S Lanthem	1,569	1,104	43.9	55.3	86	82	18	36,052	58
Segersjö	1,222	1,000	49.1	47.6	77	68	32	24,711	28
Skäcklinge	2,766	1,781	42.8	54.2	83	46	54	28,734	41
Slagsta N	1,444	963	49.4	47.4	76	32	68	23,734	35
Slagsta S	1,301	910	45.9	50.5	76	23	77	22,938	30
Storvreten S	2,685	1,619	60.0	36.7	69	27	73	21,265	32
Storvreten V	2,571	1,357	57.5	37.0	64	24	76	18,982	29
Storvreten Ö	2,035	1,123	54.7	41.9	67	35	65	20,098	29
Tingstorget	1,360	682	67.0	27.2	75	13	87	23,495	38
Tullinge C	1,348	1,031	53.1	44.4	78	63	37	26,280	53
Tullinge Gård	1,138	792	53.7	45.2	87	69	31	32,396	53
Tullinge Parkhem	1,986	1,404	45.8	53.1	85	75	25	33,937	52
Tullinge Villastad N	1,924	1,246	43.0	55.6	89	71	29	35,397	57
Tullinge Villastad S	1,337	891	41.9	56.6	86	62	38	36,608	60
Tullingeskog	1,435	1,070	49.9	49.1	84	81	19	33,501	52
Tumba C	1,816	1,406	53.1	44.1	72	49	51	22,716	39
Tuna	1,883	1,260	57.1	40.1	67	42	58	20,264	28
Uttran	1,740	1,247	38.6	60.0	83	73	27	34,096	50
Vretarna/Tumba bruk	2,150	1,542	51.7	45.7	82	52	48	28,983	41
Vårsta C/Bremora	1,658	1,247	45.6	52.6	82	70	30	27,338	33
Vårsta/Malmtorp	939	699	35.4	63.9	85	72	28	30,527	38
Ö Tullingeberg	1,816	1,337	54.3	44.4	84	63	37	28,460	49
Source: SVT

=== Residents with a foreign background ===
Botkyrka, particularly Northern Botkyrka, has one of the highest percentages of first and second generation immigrants in Sweden. 56.4% of the population has at least one parent born in another country. This makes the municipality a multi-cultural community with for example a big Syriac Orthodox Church in Hallunda and a mosque in Fittja.

In 2017, Botkyrka was one of three municipalities in Sweden with a population majority of foreign background. On 31 December 2017 the number of people with a foreign background (persons born outside of Sweden or with two parents born outside of Sweden) was 53,827, or 58.56% of the population (91,925 on 31 December 2017). On 31 December 2002 the number of residents with a foreign background was (per the same definition) 35,384, or 47.04% of the population (75,216 on 31 December 2002). On 31 December 2017 there were 91,925 residents in Botkyrka, of which 38,130 people (41.48%) were born in a country other than Sweden. Divided by country in the table below – the Nordic countries as well as the 12 most common countries of birth outside of Sweden for Swedish residents have been included, with other countries of birth bundled together by continent by Statistics Sweden.

Country of birth
31 December 2017
1	Sweden	53,795
2	Asia: Other countries	5,520
3	Turkey	4,710
4	Africa: Other countries	3,983
5	Iraq	3,503
6	European Union: Other countries	3,271
7	Poland	2,938
8	Finland	2,667
9	Syria	2,510
10	South America	2,138
11	Europe outside of the EU: other countries	1,784
12	Yugoslavia/Yugoslavia; SFR Yugoslavia/Serbia and Montenegro	931
13	Afghanistan	674
14	Iran	644
15	Eritrea	534
16	North America	468
17	Germany	395
18	Thailand	395
19	Bosnia and Herzegovina	375
20	Somalia	199
21	Norway	198
22	Denmark	124
23	Soviet Union	92
24	Oceania	38
25	Iceland	22
26	Unknown country of birth	17

== Public transportation ==
Botkyrka is served by the Stockholm public transport system. Stockholm Metro has four and Stockholm commuter rail two stations within the municipality. There is also an extensive SL bus network.

== Companies ==
Botkyrka is a municipality with several world-famous companies.

- Alfa Laval, a producer of specialized products used to heat, cool, separate and transport products including oil, water, chemicals, beverages, foodstuffs, starch and pharmaceuticals. The company also owns significant land in Botkyrka used for development of its agricultural division.
- DeLaval, a leading producer of dairy and farming machinery.
- Crane AB, a banknote design and paper production company.

Notably, Lars Magnus Ericsson who founded the LM Ericsson company (now known as Ericsson) also had properties in Botkyrka, including Hågelby gård which today is used for conferences and as an excursion place with gardens, animals, Stone Age village and more.

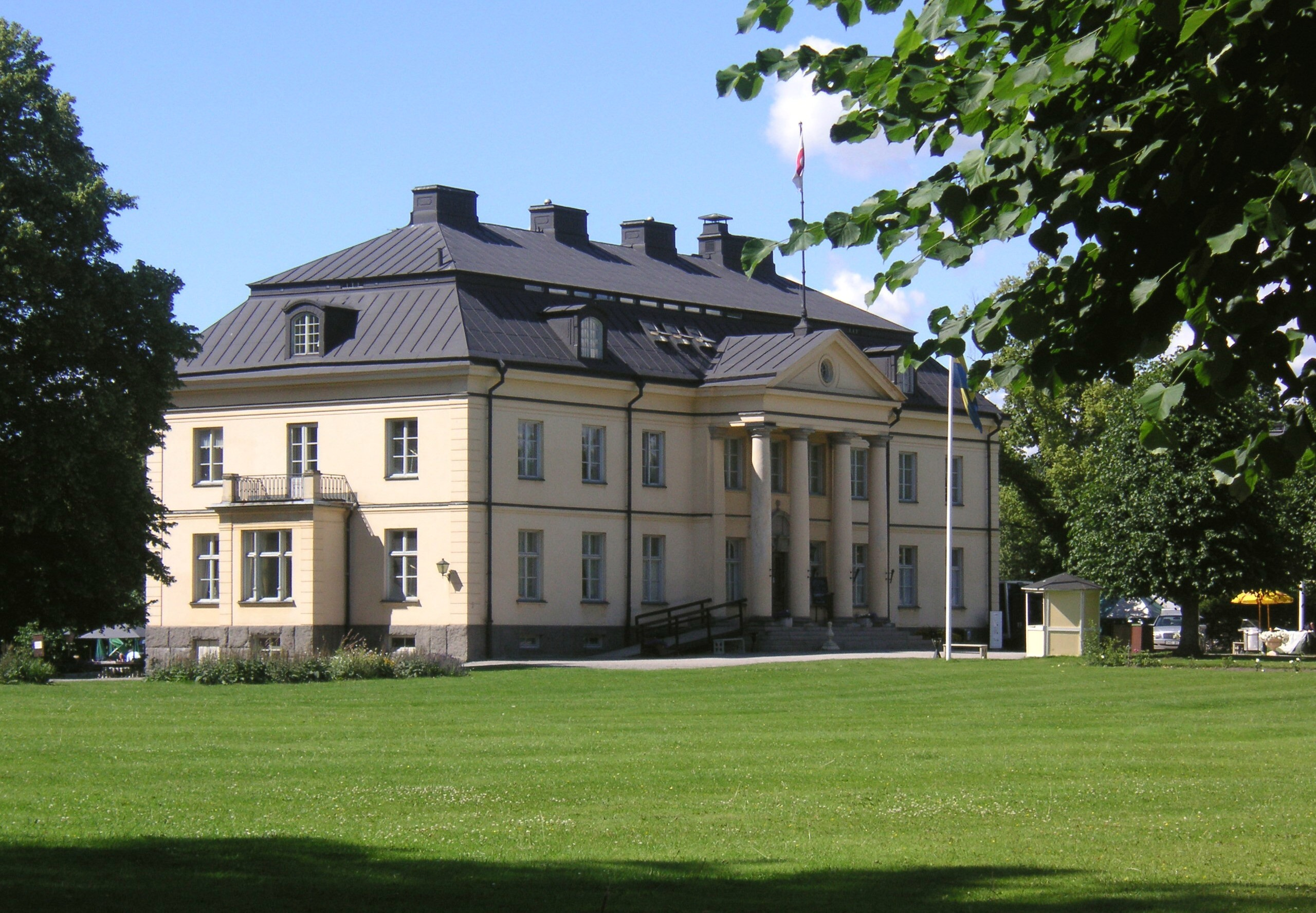
Hågelby Gård

== Districts ==
- Fittja
- Alby
- Hallunda
- Norsborg
- Tumba
- Tullinge
- Vårsta

== Sports ==
The following are some sports clubs located in Botkyrka:

- Arameiska-Syrianska Botkyrka IF
- Konyaspor KIF
- Assyriska Botkyrka FF
- IFK Tumba FK
