= Biskopsgården Church =

Coordinates: 57.7117°N 11.8912°E

- Biskopsgårdens kyrka
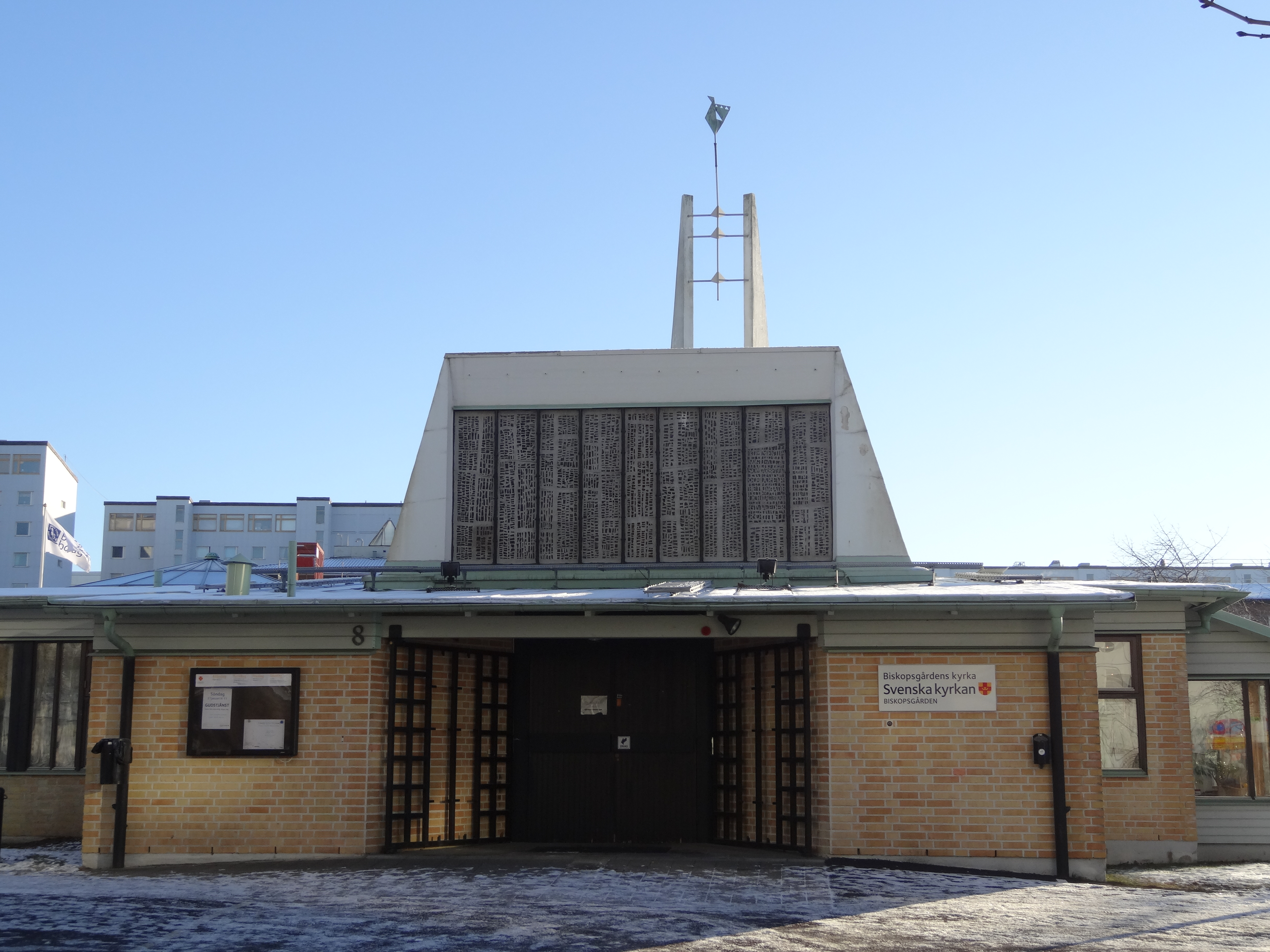
- Biskopsgården Church in January 2013
- Biskopsgården Church
- Location: Gothenburg
- Country: Sweden
- Denomination: Church of Sweden

History
- Former name: Southern Biskopsgården Church
- Consecrated: 26 February 1961

Administration
- Diocese: Gothenburg
- Parish: Lundby

The Biskopsgården Church (Swedish: Biskopsgårdens kyrka) is a church building in the southern parts of Biskopsgården on the island of Hisingen in Gothenburg, Sweden. Belonging to the Lundby of the Church of Sweden, it was opened in 1961. It was originally called the Southern Biskopsgården Church (Swedish: Södra Biskopsgårdens kyrka) before the Northern Biskopsgården Church was taken out of use in 2004.
