= Gaboro =

Swedish rapper (2000–2024)

- Born: Ninos Moses Khouri; 20 December 2000; Hageby, Sweden
- Died: 19 December 2024 (aged 23) Norrköping, Sweden
- Genres: Hip hop
- Occupations: Rapper; singer; songwriter; record producer
- Years active: 2022–2024

Ninos Moses Khouri (20 December 2000 – 19 December 2024), better known as Gaboro, was a Swedish rapper and songwriter.

Gaboro was considered a rising star in the Swedish hip-hop scene. He wore a distinct black ski mask featuring the Syriac-Aramean eagle, representing his ethnicity, along with sunglasses in his music videos, which became his trademark image. He was murdered in a gang shooting in his hometown in December 2024.

== Early life and career ==
Khouri was born and raised in Hageby-Navestad in Norrköping. Khouri first gained recognition on TikTok in 2022, and is best known for songs like "Browski" and "Suavemente". He was a rising figure in Swedish hip hop. Khouri was known for his obscuring his identity with a black ski mask and sunglasses. According to TV4, his unique style made him popular among young people.

In the music video for "Browski", Gaboro appears masked with a Syriac-Aramaic eagle printed on a thief's cap and with a cartridge belt, surrounded by masked men. The thief's cap costume with a Syriac-Aramaic eagle was a recurring element in his music videos. In an interview with Swedish DJ Alan Max, Gaboro said it paid homage to his roots. He also stated that he did not like attention and preferred to separate his private life and music career. "It symbolizes all Syriac people. I thought everyone has a black mask, so I'm going to add this eagle", Gaboro said in the interview.

In September 2022 he released his first EP, Wlak, which peaked at 7th place in the Swedish album charts. In June 2023 he released his debut album, Wlak 2, which peaked at 4th place in the Swedish album charts. He collaborated with the Swedish rapper Dizzy in a song called "Blanco" from the album. In May 2024, he released his final EP before his death called Rush Hour, which peaked at 24th place in the Swedish album charts. At the beginning of most of the songs with Gaboro, he is heard shouting "Wlak", a word that became something of a catchphrase for the rapper and which also became the title of his debut EP. The word roughly means "you" or "listen" in Arabic and is often used as a filler word. It is common as slang in Syria and Lebanon. In the interview, Gaboro also says that his name "Gaboro" means that someone is "big and respected" in Syriac.

In May 2024, Gaboro was a guest on the radio program P3 Din Gata.

== Legal issues ==
In 2022, Khouri was found guilty of minor drug offences. He has been interrogated in several police investigations in connection to drug and gang-related crimes. On one occasion, he received 17,000 Swedish crowns as compensation from the Chancellor of Justice for being detained without charge.

On 27 November 2023, a 22-year-old man was shot dead in a restaurant in Marielund, Norrköping. Khouri was also in the restaurant. The 22-year-old belonged to a criminal network that police call the Kalonetwork. The Kalonetwork are also allied with the criminal network Foxtrot, led by gang leader Rawa Majid (also called Kurdish Fox). In the police murder investigation, Khouri was described as a friend of the 22-year-old and that they went to the restaurant to eat together. In December 2024, two men in their 20s were sentenced to life in prison for the murder of Gaboro's friend. In police investigations it is further revealed that the murder in the restaurant was part of a gang conflict that the Kalonetwork had with a criminal group called M-Town from the Marielund district in Norrköping. Khouri had close ties with the Kalonetwork and he grew up with people who then became involved in the criminal Kalonetwork.

== Death and aftermath ==
On 19 December 2024, at 8:45 p.m., police received several calls about suspected gunshots in Norrköping. Several officers arrived at the scene, where they found Khouri seriously injured in a parking lot after being shot. At 10:48 p.m., Khouri was confirmed to have died from his injuries, according to police. His death is being investigated as a murder. He would have been 24 the next day.

A video clip purportedly showing the crime circulated on social media, allegedly filmed by the perpetrator. The death was followed by tributes from fellow musicians and fans, including from Swedish DJ Alan Max and Swedish rapper Imenella.

Khouri's name was also written in a "death list" by their rival gang called Marielundnetwork. The list was shared on Snapchat in September 2023. Several people are named there, including Khouri. It says, among other things, that "everyone on this list will die sooner or later" and targets "whores" from Navestad, Hageby and Ljura. It says that people are to be "exterminated" with the Hitler method. The death list ends with "with kind regards from the other side".

== Discography ==
=== Studio albums ===
- Wlak 2 (2023)

=== EPs ===
- Wlak (2022)
- Rush Hour (2024)

== See also ==
- List of murdered hip hop musicians
