= Sweden–Turkey relations =

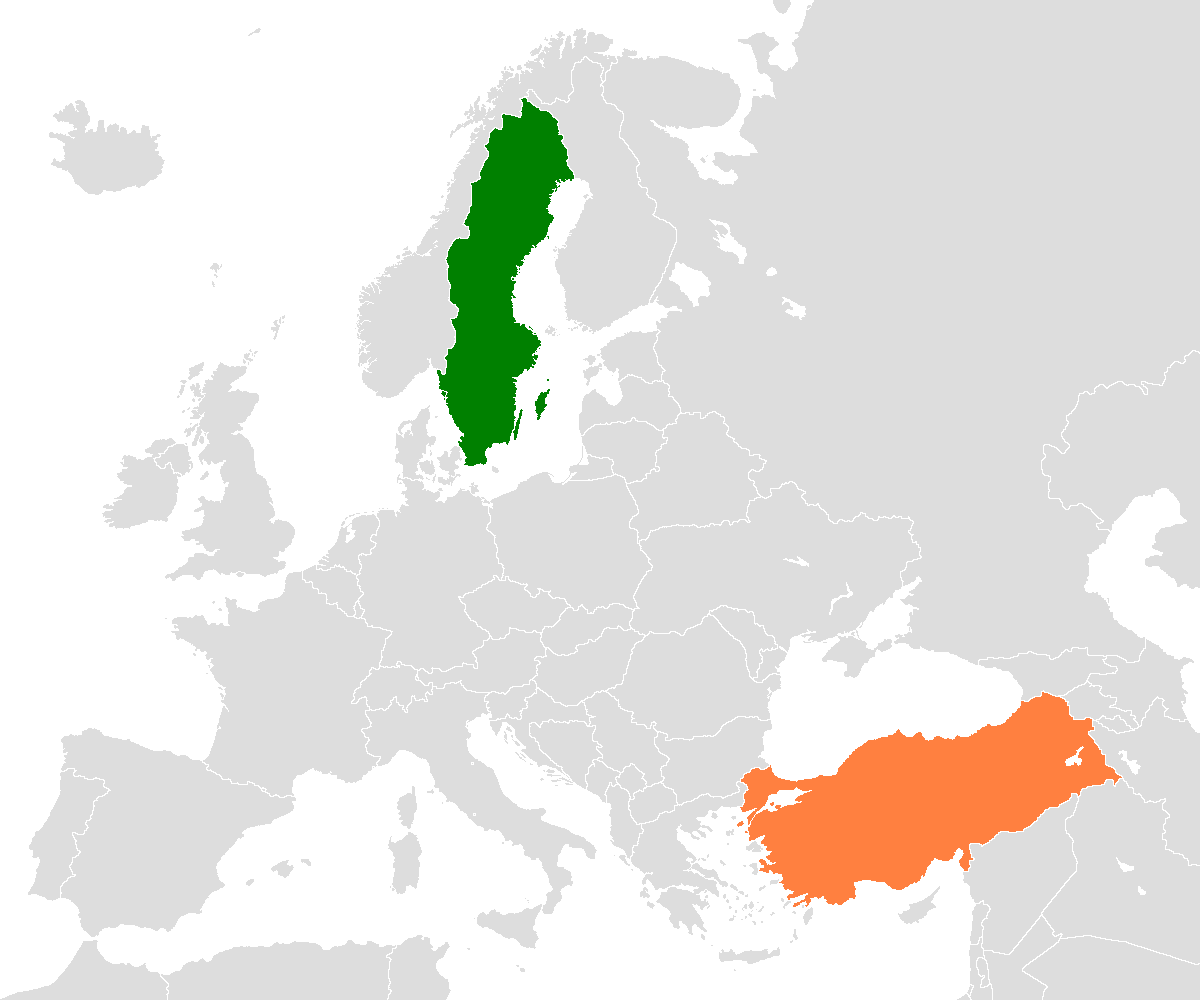
- Sweden: Turkey

Diplomatic mission
- Embassy of Sweden, Ankara: Embassy of Turkey, Stockholm

Sweden–Turkey relations are foreign relations between Sweden and Turkey. Both countries are full members of the Council of Europe, NATO, the Organisation for Economic Co-operation and Development (OECD), the Organization for Security and Co-operation in Europe (OSCE) and the Union for the Mediterranean.

Sweden has an embassy in Ankara and a consulate–general in Istanbul. Turkey has an embassy in Stockholm. Also Sweden is an EU member and Turkey is an EU candidate. Turkey did not support Sweden's accession to NATO until January 2024, but accepted its participation.

== History ==
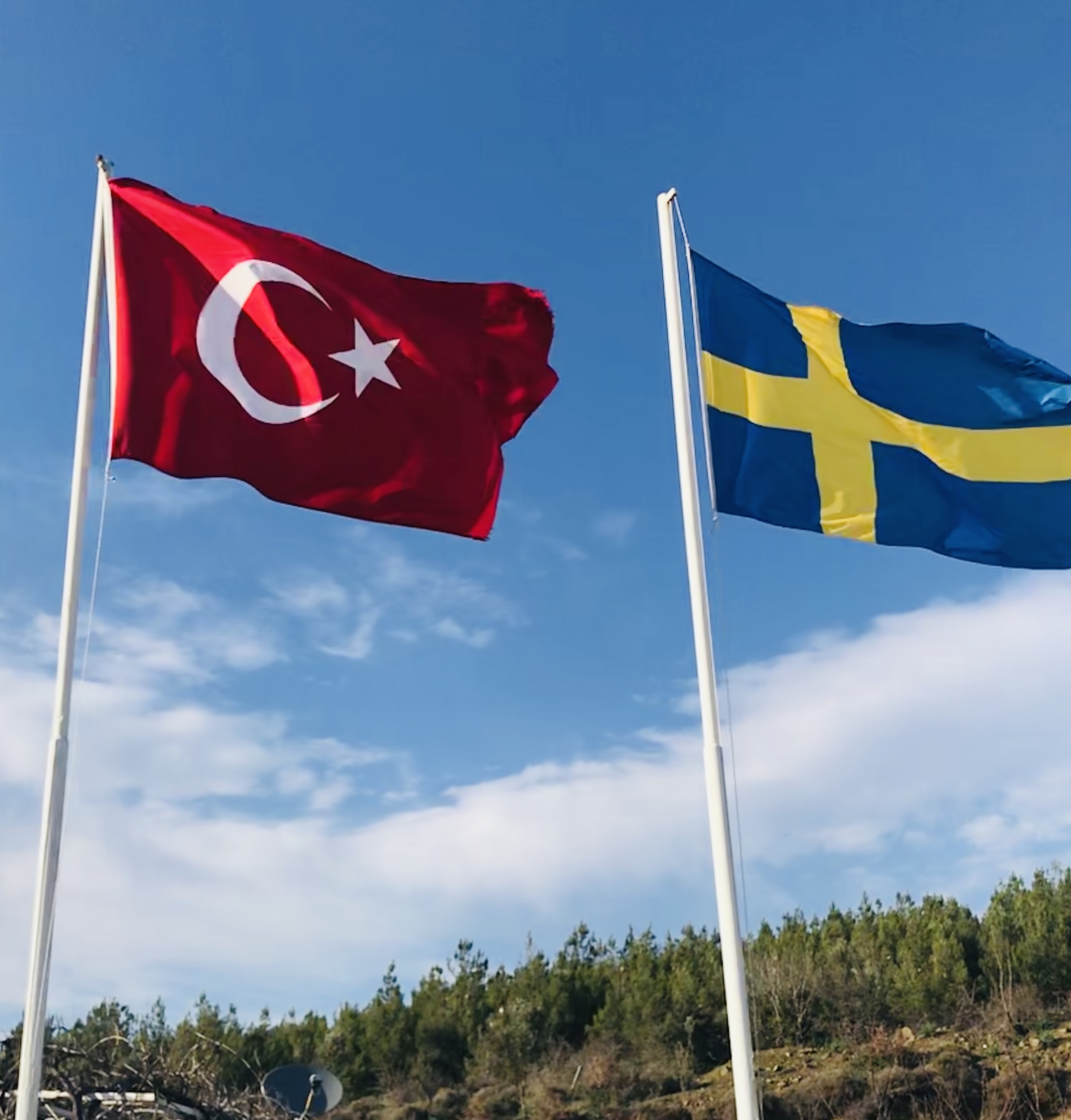
Turkish and Swedish flags in front of the Swedish-based factory, Bergama, İzmir, Turkey

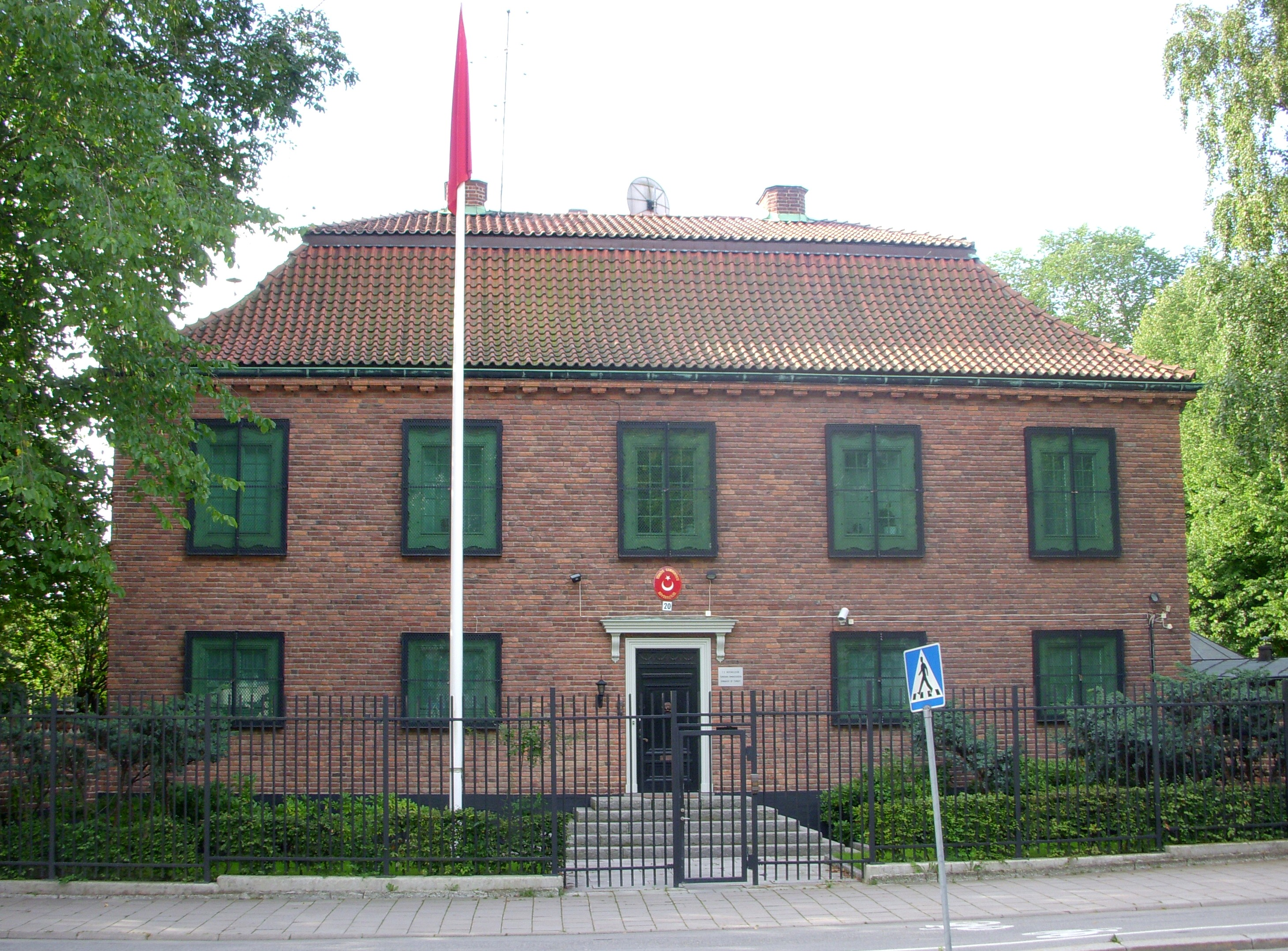
Embassy of Turkey in Stockholm, Sweden

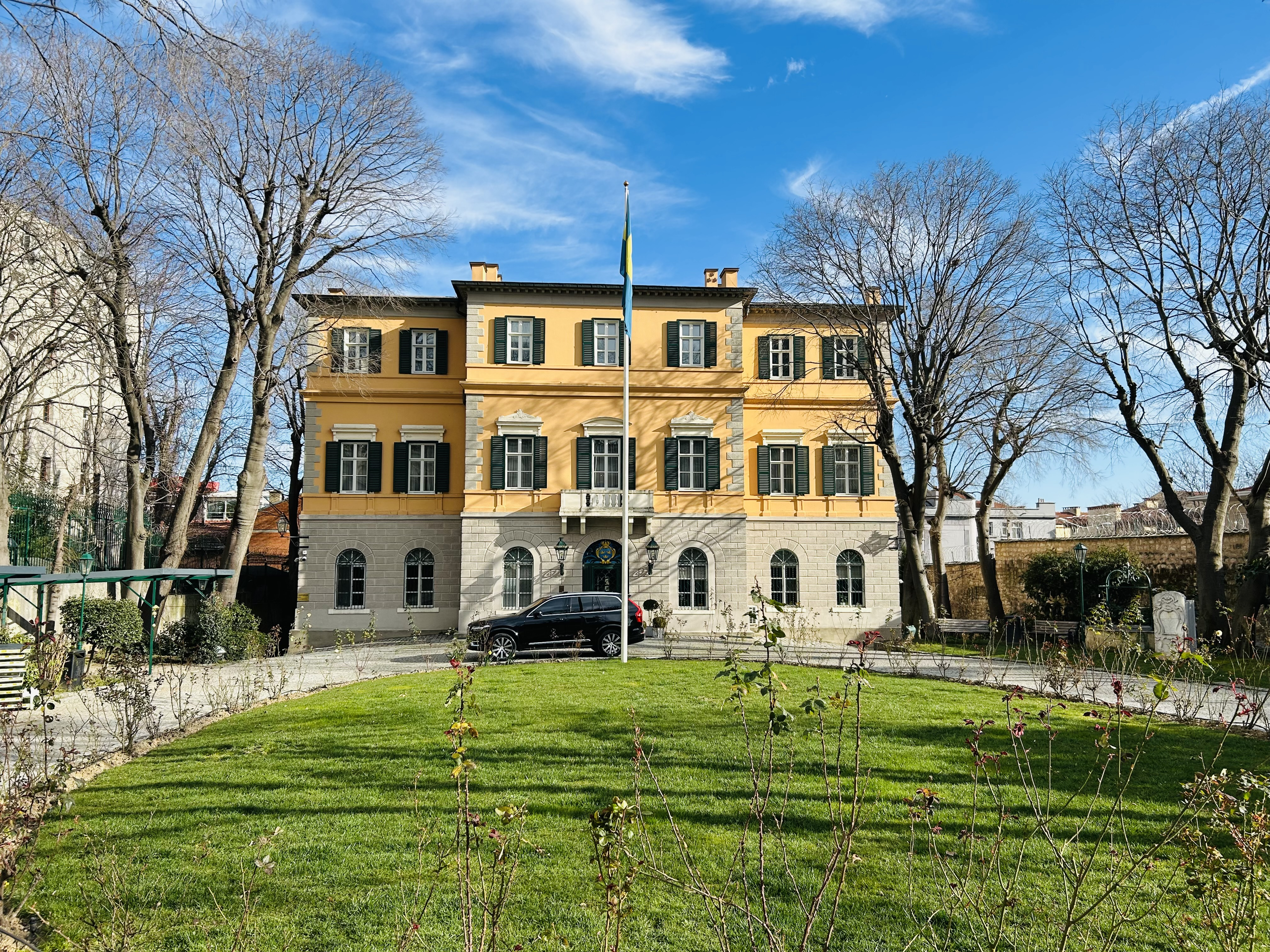
Consulate General of Sweden in Istanbul

At the beginning of the 18th century, the two countries were allied against the Tsardom of Russia during the Great Northern War. Swedish King Charles XII, after his defeat in the Battle of Poltava, took refuge in the Ottoman Empire in the city of Bender. Charles was welcomed by Ottomans and corresponded with Gülnuş Sultan, the mother of Sultan Ahmed III, who took an interest in his cause. His expenses were covered by the Ottoman State budget, as part of the fixed assets (Demirbaş in Turkish), hence his nickname Demirbaş Şarl (Fixed Asset Charles) in Turkey. (Note: Demirbaş, the Turkish word for fixed asset, is literally "ironhead" (demir as "iron", baş as "head"), which is the reason why this nickname has often been translated as Ironhead Charles. However, it should be said, that this translation is wrong and does not reflect the truth. Although, written separately, demir baş really means "iron head", the whole word demirbaş means "inventory", which reflects Charles' long stay in Ottoman Bender at expenses of sultan's exchequer.)

Sweden has had diplomatic relations with Turkey since the 1730s. Sweden has been present in Istanbul at the same place as today since 1757. Sweden opened an embassy in Ankara in October 1934.

In October 1934, Crown Prince Gustaf Adolf, Louise and Princess Ingrid visited Turkey. On 2 October they arrived in Istanbul where President Mustafa Kemal Atatürk's salon car was waiting. The journey continued to Ankara where they were received by Atatürk, Foreign Minister Tevfik Rüştü Aras, members of the government and administration. The visit to Ankara lasted between 3 and 5 October. On 5 October a two-day visit to Bursa was made. The stay in Turkey ended with a four-day stay incognito in Istanbul, during which several receptions were held at the Swedish legation. On 10 October, the royal travelers continued with the Svenska Orient Linien's motor ship Vasaland, which arrived in İzmir on the 12 October. From here, the departure took place on 15 October with the president's own train and on the 17 October arrival in Aleppo.

The Swedish Research Institute in Istanbul (SFII) was founded in 1962 and works to promote Swedish and Nordic research in and around Turkey, the Far East and Central Asia, primarily in the humanities and social sciences. Business Sweden has been active in Turkey since 1991 with offices in Istanbul.

When Sweden took over the rotating presidency of the Presidency of the Council of the European Union in 2009, the then Swedish prime minister Fredrik Reinfeldt announced his support of Turkey's European Union membership. Sweden's Green Party has criticized France and Germany's opposition to Turkey's membership. Sweden stopped selling weapons to Turkey in 2019 due to Turkey's military operation in Syria. In September 2022, Sweden lifted its embargo on weapons exports to Turkey.

=== Osman Kavala dispute ===
In October 2021, in the wake of the appeal for the release of Turkish activist Osman Kavala signed by 10 western countries, Turkish president Recep Tayyip Erdoğan ordered his foreign minister to declare the Swedish ambassador persona non grata, alongside the other 9 ambassadors. However, the ambassadors did not receive any formal notice to leave the country and Erdoğan eventually stepped back.

=== Events in 2020 ===
In 2020, Former Swedish Foreign Minister Ann Linde called for Turkey to withdraw from Syria as part of her visit to Turkey, and Turkish Foreign Minister Mevlüt Çavuşoğlu reacted harshly to his Swedish counterpart.

=== Accession of Sweden to NATO ===
While Turkey became a member of NATO in 1952, Sweden since 2024 has been a member of NATO.

In 2022, Turkey opposed Sweden and Finland's bid to join NATO, on the alleged grounds that the countries "host terrorist organisations which act against Turkey", including the PKK, PYD, YPG and Gülen movement. While the PKK is recognised as a terrorist organisation in both Sweden and Turkey, the Gülen movement is not recognised as a terrorist organisation in Sweden. In May 2022, Turkey quickly blocked the Swedish NATO membership application from being processed at an accelerated pace. In May 2022, Turkey vetoed Sweden's NATO membership. In May 2022, Swedish prime minister Magdalena Andersson, after a phone call with Turkish President Recep Tayyip Erdoğan, told Swedish state television SVT that they were ready for dialogue with Turkey on Sweden's NATO membership and they always condemned terrorism. On 28 June, during a NATO summit in Madrid, Turkey agreed to support the membership bids of Finland and Sweden. The Turkish government has since requested the extradition of members of the Gülen movement and the PKK from Finland and Sweden; that the countries stop supporting the Gülen movement, the PKK, and terrorism; and that Finland and Sweden should address Turkish security concerns. Turkey demanded that Sweden end its support to the Gülen movement and the PKK. Turkey asked Sweden to stop and end the Kurdish demonstrations. Tensions between Sweden and Turkey were sharply heightened following protests against Turkey in Stockholm. Turkey summoned Sweden's ambassador to answer for a video posted by the Swedish Solidarity Committee for Rojava that depicted an Erdoğan effigy swinging by his legs from a rope. The group compared Erdoğan to Benito Mussolini, who was hung upside down after his death. On the same day, President of the Turkish Grand National Assembly Mustafa Şentop cancelled the Swedish Parliament Speaker Andreas Norlén's visit to Turkey. On 21 January 2023, leader of the far-right Danish political party Stram Kurs, Rasmus Paludan was permitted to burn a Quran outside the Turkish embassy in Stockholm. See below for further details.

On 23 January 2024, the Turkish Parliament voted 287-55 in favour of Swedish membership. On 25 January 2024, Turkish President Recep Tayyip Erdoğan signed and approved the proposal containing Sweden's accession protocol.

=== Disputes over criminal organizations ===
The extensive bombings and shootings in Sweden, carried out by criminal organisations, has spread to Turkey, and several Swedish criminals were sentenced in Turkey in 2023. However, Turkey refuses to capture and extradite the internationally wanted Swedish criminal Rawa Majid, since he bought a Turkish citizenship through the Golden Passport program, in exchange for investments. The Deputy Prime Minister of Sweden has warned Turkey and threatened to suspend Sweden's financial aid to Turkey if Majid is not extradited, but later retracted her statement. Swedish police shared Intelligence about Rajiw Majid with Turkish police, at highest-level, but the intelligence was leaked to criminals in 2022, according to Swedish police.

== Diyanet-controlled mosques in Sweden ==
According to Swedish paper Dagens Nyheter in 2017, nine mosques in Sweden have imams sent and paid for by the Turkish Directorate of Religious Affairs (Diyanet). Along with their religious duties, the imams are also tasked with reporting on critics of the Turkish government. According to Dagens Nyheter, propaganda for president Erdoğan is openly presented in the mosques.

== Armenian genocide dispute ==
On 12 June 2008, the Riksdag refused to refer to the Armenian Genocide as actual genocide. However, on 11 March 2010, the Riksdag eventually voted for a resolution recognizing the Armenian genocide.

There was a majority of one vote, with a total of 131 in favour, 130 against, and 88 absent. Turkey promptly recalled its ambassador to Sweden and cancelled talks that were intended to happen between the two countries on March 17, 2010.

Turkish Prime Minister Recep Tayyip Erdoğan responded by issuing a statement saying "We strongly condemn this resolution, which is made for political calculations. It does not correspond to the close friendship of our two nations". Turkey's ambassador to Sweden Zergun Koruturk said on Aktuellt that there would be "drastic effects" of a long-term nature on relations between the two countries, saying "I am very disappointed. Unfortunately, parliamentarians were thinking that they were rather historians than parliamentarians, and it's very, very unfortunate". Swedish Foreign Minister Carl Bildt blogged from Copenhagen that he "regretted" the outcome of the vote.

== Quran burning dispute ==
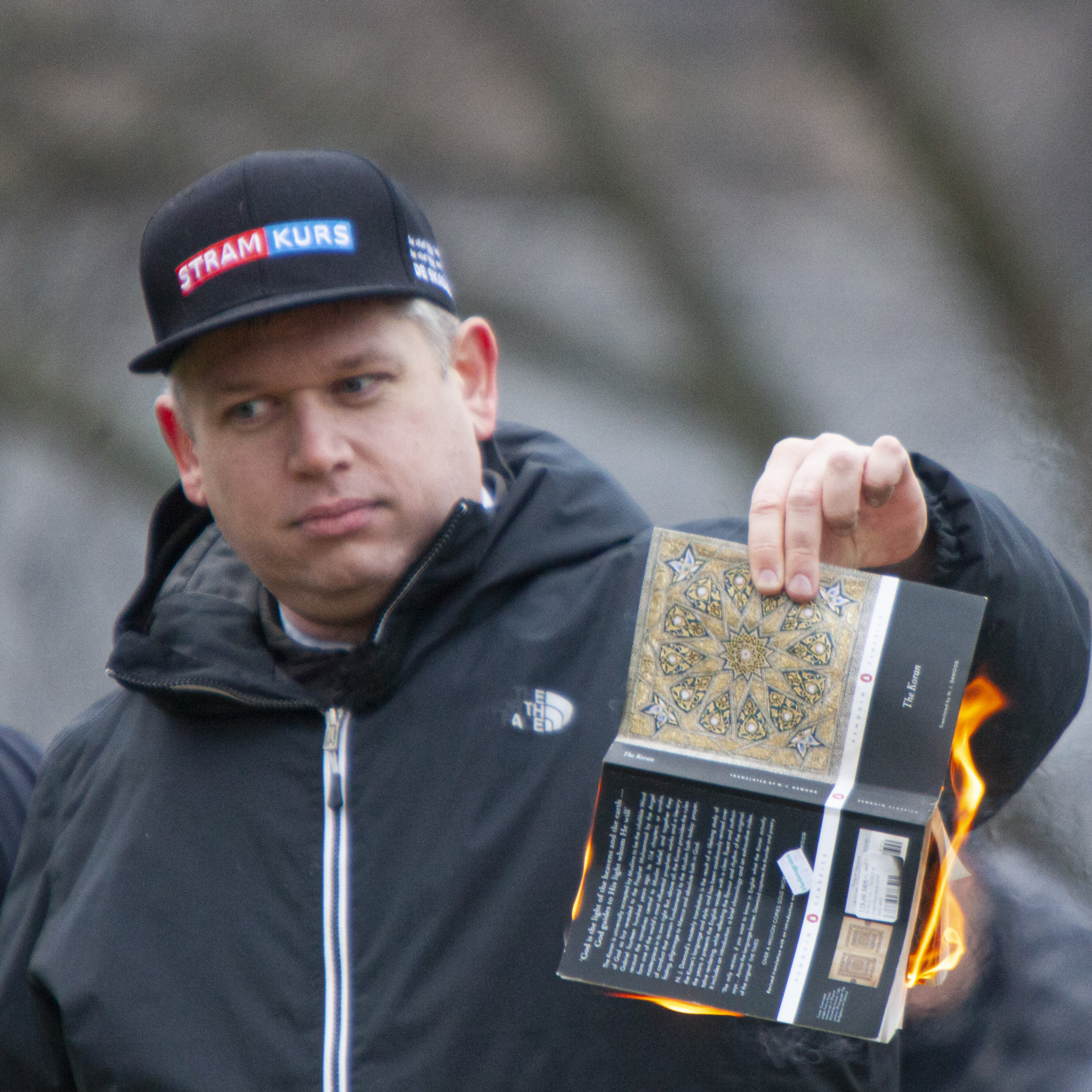
Rasmus Paludan burning the Quran outside the Turkish embassy in Stockholm, 21 January 2023

In January 2023, a consultant of the nationalist Sweden Democrat party applied for a police permission to organize a demonstration outside the Turkish Embassy in Stockholm, with the alleged intent to burn the Turkish flag, in an attempt to sabotage the Swedish NATO application and to protest against Erdogan. However, during the demonstration on the 21 of January, Rasmus Paludan, a Danish-Swedish right-wing politician, burned a Quran instead. The Swedish Police did not deny the permit as there is no law against blasphemy in Sweden, and no explicit prohibition against burning the flag of any country, but a strong protection of freedom of speech in the constitution. During the 2022 Sweden riots, the police only occasionally denied Quran burnings that posed severe risk of disorderly conduct, when the applications were late. Muslims have interpreted the Quran desecrations in Europe as motived by islamophobia (i.e. fear and hate) rather than as taking a stand for free speech. Laws against incitement to ethnic hatred, including anti-Semitism and hate crimes with Islamophobic motive, do exist in Sweden. However, prosecutors believe that burning a holy book would not be considered illegal and have therefore not tested the matter in court.

The Swedish government were not allowed to decide on the demonstration, as they are forbidden to tell the police or other authorities/government agencies how to interpret the law and act in a specific case due to the constitutional prohibition of ministerial rule in Sweden. After the incident, the Swedish prime minister apologized and expressed his sympathies to Muslims worldwide. Despite the apology, Turkish President Erdogan said that Sweden can rely on "terrorists" and "extremists" to protect it instead of a strong NATO ally who happens to be proud and defensive of its Islamic values. The Sweden Democrat party continued to hire the consultant despite his initiative.

Following the incident, Turkish Minister of National Defense Hulusi Akar canceled the visit of Swedish defense minister Pål Jonson to Ankara. Following the Quran burning incident, the Yeni Akit newspaper called for a boycott of Swedish companies such as H&M and IKEA.

Permission for another Quran burning outside the Turkish embassy in Stockholm was denied on 8 February 2023, by the Swedish police in dialogue with the Swedish Security Service.

Turkish Foreign Minister Mevlüt Çavuşoğlu compared Sweden to Nazi Germany, saying that: "The Nazis started by burning books, then they attacked religious gathering places, and then they gathered people in camps and burned them to achieve their ultimate goals. That's how things like this start."

However, Swedish police granted permission for a Quran-burning protest outside a mosque on the Muslim holiday of Feast of Sacrifice, coinciding with June 28. The go ahead came two weeks after a Swedish appeals court rejected the police's decision to deny permits for two demonstrations in Stockholm which were to include Quran burnings. Turkey politician Omer Celik considered "the Swedish Supreme Court's stance" as "protection of hate crimes".

The Swedish Foreign Ministry condemned the burning of a copy of the Quran, carried out by an Iraqi born man outside the Stockholm Central Mosque on the first day of the Muslim festival of Eid al Adha.

In the meantime, Türkiye's newly sworn in Foreign Minister Hakan Fidan voiced concerns over the impact of the potential Swedish membership to NATO, in terms of both security and strategic implications, after the Nordic state's inability to stop attacks against the Quran, which can create further problems for the alliance.

President Recep Tayyip Erdogan said, "We will not say yes to (Sweden's) entry into NATO as long as you allow our holy book, the Quran, to be burned, torn apart, and to be done with (the approval of) your security personnel."

Three days later, during the NATO 2023 Vilnius summit, Erdogan promised to ensure ratification of Sweden's bid to join NATO, as soon as possible.

The United Nations General Assembly responded by adopting a resolution on 25 July 2023 which considered violence against holy books to be violations of international law.

News came out that plainclothes police had attempted to silence a protester against the burning of the Quran in the Swedish capital, Stockholm. Police intervened as Kais Tunisia was loudly responding to Iraqi-born extremist Salwan Momika's words while burning the Muslim holy book in front of the Stockholm Mosque. The extremist was escorted away from the scene in an armoured police vehicle. Approximately 20 police vehicles of which 10 were armoured and 100 police officers escorted them.

== Cooperation ==
A meeting of the Turkish-Swedish Security Mechanism was held with the participation of senior officials from both countries in Türkiye's capital Ankara on 21 January 2025. Turkish Foreign Minister Hakan Fidan, Swedish Foreign Minister Maria Malmer Stenergard, and Swedish Justice Minister Gunnar Strömmer attended the event. The meeting was meant to advance cooperation in counterterrorism efforts between the two countries.

== Resident diplomatic missions ==
- Sweden has an embassy in Ankara and a consulate-general in Istanbul.
- Turkey has an embassy in Stockholm.

== Honorary consulates ==
Sweden also has an honorary consulates in Alanya, Antalya, İzmir and Mersin. Turkey also has an honorary consulates in Malmö.

== See also ==
- Turkey–European Union relations
- Sweden–NATO relations
- Islam in Sweden
- Turks in Sweden
- Kurds in Sweden
- Nuance Party, a Turkey-friendly Swedish political party
- Finland–Turkey relations
- Palais de Suède, Istanbul
