= List of grenade attacks in Sweden =

This crime's category is very new in Sweden and was not even logged before 2017.

== Background ==
Bombings increased significantly in 2015, with Swedish police investigating around 100–150 explosions. There were over 30 explosions reported in the Swedish city of Malmö alone by August 2015, up from a total of 25 in all of 2014. Malmö police have consequently warned about undetonated grenades in the city. By 2019, there were more than 100 explosions in Sweden.

Many such attacks are related to organised crime and extortion of restaurants and businesses. Far-right political activists spreading anti-immigrant sentiments have attributed the rise in grenade attacks and crime with the migrant crisis, a claim that has been disputed. Paulina Neuding of The Spectator wrote that Swedish officials have failed to effectively address the problem: "it's still hard for Swedish authorities to be frank about what's going on. It's widely known that gang members are mainly first- and second-generation immigrants."

Detonated hand grenades in Sweden from 2011 to 5 December 2018.

In Malmö the grenades are frequently old weapons from the wars in the Balkans. The police assume that someone imported a large cache of grenades, which has then been distributed to criminal gangs. In addition to grenade attacks, there are a significant number of related bomb attacks with improvised explosive devices, including homemade bombs. The number of incidents involving explosives tripled between 2008 and 2016. According to a December 2018 Swedish Television interview with researcher Amir Rostami, Sweden has a high number of hand grenade attacks compared to neighbouring countries Denmark, Norway, and Germany. According to the Swedish police the reason may be the light sentence for possession compared to a firearm and that the evidence destroys itself when used. While gun homicides were on the rise in the 2011–2018 time span, according to a study at Malmö University, the number of hand grenade attacks had shown a strong increase in the same period and a total of 116 hand grenade detonations were recorded. Rostami said criminologists in Sweden don't know why there was a strong increase and why Sweden has a much higher rate than countries close by. Statistics are hard to come by as the only country apart from Sweden that publishes statistics is Mexico.

The hand grenades found by the police are exclusively the ex-Yugoslavian M75 hand grenade.

While Swedish media sometimes are accused of not covering the topic enough, a 2019 study by polling company Kantar Sifo found that law and order was the most covered news topic on Swedish TV and radio and on social media.

== List of noted attacks ==
=== 1993 ===
- A man from Azerbaijan held 82 people hostage with two hand grenades on a hijacked plane at the Stockholm Arlanda Airport.
- The leader of Sverigedemokraterna's youth organisation and a leading member of the parent organisation is arrested with a hand grenade in Kungsträdgården where Gudrun Schyman was going to hold a speech.

=== 2002–2012 ===
- Four hand grenades exploded under cars in Gothenburg between 2002 and 2006 (one in 2002 and in 2004, and two in 2006). The attacks were linked to a local Bandidos group that was founded and led by Mehdi Seyyed. Seyyed was sentenced to nine years in prison for the two attacks in 2006.
- Two explosive attacks or attempts (one in 2011, one in 2008), were reported to be as a result of hand grenades, among 22 bomb attacks in Malmö between 2008 and 2011.

=== 2013 ===
- 9 June, Malmö, a hand grenade exploded in a garbage shed on Ramels väg, damaging several cars.
- 14 September, Malmö, two people were hospitalised after a hand grenade exploded at Köpmansgatan.
- 9 November, Malmö, a device exploded in the stairwell of an assembly building in Norra Grängesbergsgatan.

=== 2014 ===
- 26 January, Malmö, a hand grenade was thrown into the window of a family's home in Seved. Thought to have been thrown by the assailants into a mistaken apartment, the family of three were said by police to have likely survived only because the father managed to close the bedroom door in time.
- 15 April, Malmö, a grenade exploded outside a restaurant in Adelgatan.
- 6 May, Malmö, one man was severely injured after a grenade was thrown into his apartment on Estlandsgatan. The grenade was thought by police to have been thrown into a mistaken apartment by the assailants.
- 19 May, Malmö, a grenade exploded in Seved damaging eight cars and several buildings.

=== 2015 ===
- 7 February, Sollentuna, a grenade exploded in the stairwell of an apartment block in Edsberg.
- 23 April, Malmö, a restaurant was damaged after a hand grenade exploded in Adelgatan.
- 21 May, Uppsala, two hand grenades exploded after being thrown into the nightclub Birger Jarl.
- 12 June, Malmö, two passers-by were injured when a grenade exploded in Rasmusgatan in Seved.
- 16 June, Malmö, an explosion occurred in Almgården near Rosengård.
- 20 June, Malmö, two live grenades were thrown at an apartment building in Kroksbäck, but failed to detonate. 60 people were evacuated.
- 13 July, Malmö, a hand grenade exploded outside a family residence in Augustenborg.
- 15 July, Malmö, a grenade exploded near a residence in Arlöv.
- 17 July, Malmö, three cars were damaged after an explosion in Branteviksgatan.
- 21 July, Malmö, one man was injured after a grenade exploded outside a community hall on Norra Grängesbergsgatan.
- 23 July, Malmö, a grenade exploded under a car in Limhamn, damaging nearby cars and buildings.
- 24 July, Malmö, a grenade exploded at a social office and damaged nearby cars.
- 26 July, Malmö, a grenade exploded at a parking lot in Värnhem, damaging ten cars and shattering several house windows.
- 5 August, Trelleborg, a hand grenade exploded after being thrown into a social office.
- 9 August, Malmö, a hand grenade exploded in a residential area in Möllevången, with thirty windows shattered in the blast.
- 20 August, Botkyrka, a hand grenade exploded after being thrown at a police van with four police officers inside in Tumba.
- 11 September, Borås, a hand grenade exploded in a residential area in Hässleholmen, shattering several windows.
- 13 October, Gothenburg, a grenade exploded in Biskopsgården damaging six apartments.
- 11 November, Landskrona, the exterior of a house and several cars were damaged in a hand grenade attack.
- 2 December, Uppsala, a hand grenade exploded in the nightclub Birger Jarl.
- 27 December, Helsingborg, a nightclub in Bruksgatan received extensive damages in a bombing.

=== 2016 ===
In 2016 there were about almost 40 hand grenade attacks in Sweden.

- 27 January, Landskrona, several cars were damaged and windows shattered after a hand grenade exploded in Tränggatan.
- 12 February, Gothenburg, two grenades exploded within nine minutes in apartments in two different locations (Lunden and Angered).
- 22 March, Uppsala, a hand grenade exploded after being thrown into an apartment balcony.
- 28 March, Stockholm, two hand grenades exploded in central Stockholm, damaging the entrances and exterior of a nightclub and restaurants.
- 6 April, Stockholm, a grenade exploded after being thrown into a restaurant in Jakobsberg.
- 11 April, Uppsala, one man was hospitalised after a grenade he held exploded at a parking lot in Stenhagen.
- 17 April, Landskrona, a hand grenade exploded after being thrown into an apartment, possibly against a casual target.
- 18 May, Malmö, a hand grenade caused extensive damages after being thrown at a villa in Fosie, likely against a casual target.
- 7 June, Botkyrka, a hand grenade exploded in central Fittja.
- 7 June, Botkyrka, one man was wounded by shrapnel after a grenade exploded outside an office building in Slagsta.
- 23 June, Tomelilla, a hand grenade exploded outside a villa.
- 24 June, Uppsala, a hand grenade exploded in a pizza restaurant.
- 9 July, Sollentuna, a grenade exploded while automatic weapons were fired in a residential area, amid four local shootouts in two days.
- 12 July, Botkyrka, a grenade exploded after being thrown under a parked car in Tumba.
- 28 July, Malmö, a hand grenade exploded in an apartment after several assailants had kicked in the door.
- 22 August, Gothenburg, a hand grenade exploded in an apartment in Biskopsgården, killing an 8-year-old child Yuusuf Warsame from Birmingham, England. The attack was connected to an ongoing feud between members of Gothenburg's Somali community, as a person who was sentenced for the 2015 Gothenburg pub shooting is registered at the address.
- 4 September, Gothenburg, one or two grenades exploded on the apartment balcony of an elderly disabled man, creating a hole and blasting out several windows. The grenade was thought by police to have been thrown indiscriminately at the apartment in a gang-area.
- 23 October, Malmö, a hand grenade exploded nearby a garage and a car in Husie.
- 28 October, Landskrona, a hand grenade exploded in a pizza restaurant.
- 11 November, Malmö, a hand grenade exploded after being thrown at a car rental company, situated adjacent to a gas station.
- 15 November, Västerås, a hand grenade exploded in a hair salon. The attack was thought to be part of extortion.
- 21 November, Ängelholm, a grenade exploded near an apartment block, blasting out several windows.
- 30 November, Solna, a hand grenade exploded after being thrown into an apartment balcony where a person was standing in the kitchen. The person got out of the apartment unharmed, while the balcony was wrecked and several windows were shattered. The event is linked to gang crime.
- 15 December, Gothenburg, a hand grenade exploded causing damage to two apartments in Biskopsgården.

=== 2017 ===
- 1 January, Katrineholm, a grenade was thrown at the local police station. The entrance, several windows and three cars parked nearby were damaged.
- 13 February, Södertälje, a hand grenade exploded in a residential area, where an entrepreneur who had recently been extorted had their offices.
- 28 February, Malmö, one person was wounded by shrapnel and hospitalised after a grenade exploded outside a residence in Lindängen.
- 11 April, Linköping, a hand grenade was thrown onto a balcony.
- 7 July, Stockholm, a hand grenade exploded in a shop in a residential area in Spånga.
- 21 July, Uppsala, a hand grenade exploded in a restaurant.
- 23 July, Halmstad, a hand grenade exploded in a parking lot and damaged five cars.
- 2 September, Märsta, a hand grenade exploded in a restaurant. No people were injured.
- 6 September, Stockholm, a hand grenade exploded in a residential building in Östermalm.
- 18 September, Gothenburg, a hand grenade exploded after being thrown at an apartment in Biskopsgården.
- 28 September, Varberg, a hand grenade exploded damaging a villa in central Varberg.
- 13 October, Malmö, a hand grenade exploded in a residential building.
- 18 October, Helsingborg, a hand grenade destroyed the entrance of the local police station. Forty windows were blown out in the explosion.
- 21 October, Stockholm, a hand grenade exploded by a car in central Solna.
- 27 November, Uppsala, a hand grenade was thrown at a police car outside the local police station. No people were injured, but several cars were damaged in the explosion. One suspect was arrested.
- 3 December, Gothenburg, a grenade exploded outside a family home in Hisingen.

=== 2018 ===
- 7 January, Stockholm, a man in his 60s was killed and a 45-year-old woman was injured after a grenade exploded outside the Vårby gård metro station. The grenade which was accidentally picked up by the man had been abandoned at the side of the path.
- 21 January, Gothenburg, a hand grenade exploded after being thrown through the window into a house in Biskopsgården in which seven people were present. The attack was linked to gang conflicts involving several grenade attacks between rival gangs in December the previous year.
- 8 February, Stockholm, windows were blasted out and a car was damaged when a hand grenade exploded outside the home of a bank employee reported to be involved in uncovering fraud cases and assisting police in cases linked to heavy organised crime.
- In August 2018, two men from Uppsala were arrested for having thrown grenades at the home of a bank employee who investigates fraud cases.
- 7 September 2018 a hand grenade was thrown into a restaurant in Gothenburg.

== Responses ==
Along with a number of shootings, the summer of 2015 was dubbed "the summer of unrest" by Swedish Prime Minister Stefan Löfven, who during a speech said the attacks would "not be tolerated". Some hundred new police officers were set to be appointed in Malmö in the following months, after concerns were raised by the regional police union. Police began work the same summer of attempting to thwart "mass hysteria" among terrified Malmö residents.

In 2017 the Swedish government proposed harsher punishments for possession of grenades.

In 2018 the Swedish government proposed a three-month "grenade amnesty" to be held from October 2018 to January 2019.

== See also ==
- Organized crime in Sweden
- 2015 Gothenburg car bombing
- Terrorism in Sweden
