= Gothenburg pub shooting =

2015 gang violence in Gothenburg, Sweden

- Location: 57°42′44.442″N 11°53′30.743″E; Gothenburg, Sweden
- Date: 18 March 2015; 22:00 (CET)
- Target: Rival gang members (south Biskopsgården)
- Attack type: Mass shooting, gang shooting
- Weapon: AKM rifles
- Deaths: 2
- Injuries: 8+
- Perpetrators: Adam Abdulahi; Ahmed Warsame; Jonis Adan; Onur Corap; Josef Hällgren Abdulrahman

The shootings at the pub Vår Krog & Bar in Gothenburg happened on 18 March 2015. Two unidentified gunmen entered a pub in Gothenburg, Sweden, and began firing indiscriminately at people inside the restaurant. The pub, Vår Krog & Bar, is located in the Biskopsgården neighbourhood of Gothenburg on Hisingen, an area that has witnessed gang violence. The shootings are one of the rare times in which an innocent bystander has been killed in criminal rival gang violence in Sweden. The shooters were part of a gang from North Biskopsgården out for revenge.

A year after the event, the Göteborgs-Posten newspaper described the shootings as "one of the most unprecedented crimes of 2015." Other newspapers characterized it as part of "a wave of high-profile attacks in Sweden in 2015", and part of "a surge in violent conflict between rival criminal gangs."

In 2010, Biskopsgården was the Gothenburg district which had the highest rate of gang violence. In 2012, a territorial crime gang in the area split into two factions. The bar shooting was meant to destroy one of the rival factions.

== Shooting ==
The attack began when four suspects parked a car outside a pub in Gothenburg. Two of the masked suspects entered the pub with fully loaded AKM assault rifles. One shooter was wearing a police vest. The pub was full of people watching a football match in the bar. The gunmen walked quickly around the rooms, spraying ammunition at anyone in their way, but focusing on one man who was their suspected main target. The gunmen shot random people sitting at tables and at the bar, indiscriminately, and shot the suspected target in the face, killing him instantly. The suspected target was 25-year-old Houssein Chit from a rival gang. According to police reports the victim "didn't have a face left". On their way out they shot at more survivors and once the gunmen exited the bar, they shot and killed an innocent bystander, then fleeing the scene in the nearby car driven by the other suspects.

The street of the pub was already under surveillance by police because of suspected drug dealing going on nearby, this made it possible for police to call for back-up and arrive very early on the chaotic scene and begin first aid. It is speculated by some that had police not arrived so quickly, many more would have died from gunshot wounds and loss of blood.

A witness who spoke to journalists for Aftonbladet, said that he saw two people enter the restaurant in Biskopsgården carrying guns that looked like AK-47 assault rifles, and start shooting. Sky News described the gunman as having "sprayed the pub with bullets".

Some early news reports described the shooting as terrorism related, which turned out to be false, it was later discovered that the suspects were targeting a rival gang member, thus making it a gang shooting.

The responding police units and ambulances described a bloodbath inside the pub and a surreal scene with the girlfriend of one victim sitting next to the body "which had no face left" and one customer so shocked he was still sitting in the bar casually drinking a beer. The reports mention a thick stench of iron and gunpowder from the blood and gunshots making it hard for the police to breathe. One policeman said he repeatedly thought he dropped his keys when searching the pub, because he heard a metallic noise, and realizing that it was the floor covered with bullet cases which was impossible to not step on that made the noise every time he moved. Another police on the scene mentioned how almost no details, mirrors or furniture had been damaged, as the shooters had systematically targeted the people inside.

== Investigation and trials ==
The gunmen were believed to have fled the scene after the shooting. Following the shooting police sealed off the area and launched a murder investigation.

Initially, four people were arrested in connection with the shooting. Five men were eventually charged with murder. On 8 August 2016, following a two-month trial at the Gothenburg District Court, two of the men were sentenced to life imprisonment; the other three, who were under the age of 21 at the time of the shooting, were sentenced to 14 years in prison. Three other people were sentenced to between 7 and 14 years for aiding and abetting the crime. The seven were convicted of aiding and abetting murder and aiding and abetting attempted murder, as authorities could not prove precisely who was holding the murder weapons.

== Perpetrators ==
All perpetrators behind the shooting grew up in the northern parts of Biskopsgården district, or had connections there. The majority of the accused have East African origins, particularly Somalia, but had mainly grown up in Scandinavia.

- Adam Abdi Abdulahi, born 28 December 1987, is a Danish citizen. He was sentenced to life in prison for two murders and 24 attempted murders by the district court. The courts of appeal upheld the life in prison sentence, but changed the charges from two murders to two cases of aiding and abetting murder. Five of the 24 attempted murder charges were changed into a charge of causing danger to others (Swedish: framkallande av fara för annan) and he was convicted of those five. He procured the police vest, rented the two apartments where the shooting was prepared and rented the escape vehicle. In 2011 he was sentenced to 30 months in prison for drug offences and drug smuggling. The sentence was partially served in Denmark.
- Ahmed Abdirahman Ahmednuur Warsame, born 22 February 1992, was sentenced to life in prison. Warsame was involved in purchasing the escape vehicle. For some years he lived in England but he returned to Gothenburg in February 2015, only a month before the shooting. In March 2014 he was shot in the foot, the day after Adam Abdulahi was fired upon. He was convicted of the same charges and given the same sentence as Abdulahi.
- Onur Corap, born 29 May 1995, grew up and lived in Biskopsgården, had training from the Swedish Armed Forces and a professional license as a security guard. He knew the other perpetrators from school. Unlike the other perpetrators, he had good grades from secondary education and had several steady jobs. He was sentenced to 14 years in prison. He was also sentenced for having shot and killed a victim in his 50s in the Brämaregården area.
- Josef Arvid Hällgren Abdulrahman, born 15 July 1995, grew up in Biskopsgården and had previous convictions for robbery, unlawful driving and minor drug offences. He had connections to the group Pantrarna ("The Panthers"), which was supposed to help by working with assisting and informing vulnerable districts in the city, but also comprised several members with connections to organized crime. He was a young aspiring football professional who was ready to sign a contract with Chelsea Football Club, before he participated in the shooting. He was sentenced to 14 years in prison by the district court, but the court of appeal shortened his sentence to 12 years in prison due to his younger age.
- Jonis Faisal Adan, born 13 January 1995, lived in Biskopsgården until 2014. He had several convictions for serious crimes, the first at 15 years old when he was arrested for possessing a weapon. He was sentenced in 2010 and 2014 again for possessing a weapon, battery and theft. He procured the balaclavas used during the shooting, two bulletproof vests and rented the white Volvo which was used. He was sentenced to 14 years in prison by the district court, which was upheld by the court of appeal.
- Two further accused were convicted of aiding and abetting the shooting, one of whom is believed to have committed arson in another part of the city to distract emergency service.

The two who received the longest sentences had their names published by Sveriges Television, contrary to standard practice, as their crime had a great impact on the general public, as the majority of the customers in the pub were ordinary law-abiding citizens. Three of the perpetrators did not have their name published as they were 19–20 years old at the time, a fact which was taken into account by the courts as well for their sentences.

The three perpetrators aged 21 were later named as Josef Hällgren Abdulrahman (The Footballer), Jonis Adan (The Car Renter) and Onur Corap (The Security Guard).

In 2018, Jonis Adan was incarcerated at Saltvik prison, a prison with the highest security level. In the spring of 2020, Adan was moved to Salberga prison from Kumla prison. Later the same year prison authorities had recorded eight counts of disordely conduct for Adan while in prison, among which was using violence against another prisoner.

== Casualties ==
Innocent random bystander, Petar Petrovic (born 12 July 1994) a Swedish citizen of Serbian origin, who worked at the pub as a DJ and was scheduled to start university in London, was killed.

The other casualty was a 25-year-old who was reported to have recently been released from jail and said to be a leading figure in a local gang, called Vårvädersligan after the square where the shootings took place. Another gang member is said to have left the pub just before the shootings.

Emergency services told newspaper GT that eight people had been taken to hospital and two people were confirmed dead.

== Motive ==
The shootings are widely regarded as being probably related to rivalry between immigrant gangs for control of the illegal trade in drug smuggling. Hells Angels, Bandidos Motorcycle Club and gangs made up of members of several immigrant groups reportedly battle for control of the local drug trade.

Police spokeswoman Ulla Brehm was quoted as saying that the attack could have been gang related and was not terror related.

== Aftermath ==
The events sparked a national debate about gun crime in Sweden's second largest city. According to Associated Press reporter Karl Ritter, the problem of gang violence is exacerbated by the fact that the gangs operate in, "immigrant neighborhoods, where people come from other countries where perhaps they don't have the same trust in their authorities as people in general do in Sweden."

According to The Guardian, "Sweden has been shocked by the barbarity and indiscriminate nature of the Gothenburg shootings... The tragedy has also shone a spotlight on a hidden aspect of Swedish society that reads like the subplot of a Stieg Larsson novel, in which poverty, racism and segregation are driving young men from immigrant backgrounds into gangs and gun crime.”

This crime is part of a recent wave of crimes that, according to Swedish journalist Joakim Palmkvist, play into "the hand of the far right," driving centrist voters to support the anti-immigration Sweden Democrats.

The police and prosecutor were criticized in Aftonbladet and other media for translating gangsta rap lyrics that the shooters had listened to before and after the shooting, and using this as part of the evidence in the case.

== See also ==
- 2015 Gothenburg car bombing
