= Murder of Elin Krantz =

2010 murder case in Sweden

- Elin Krantz
- Date: 26 September 2010
- Location: Biskopsgården, Gothenburg, Sweden; 57°43′58.5″N 11°53′40″E
- Cause: Blunt trauma
- Burial: Sankt Olof kyrkogård, Falköping, Sweden
- Convicted: Ephrem Yohannes
- Convictions: Murder; Attempted rape
- Sentence: 16 years imprisonment; Deportation on release

Elin Krantz was a Swedish 27-year-old woman who was murdered in the Biskopsgården district of Gothenburg on 26 September 2010. Krantz was murdered by Ephrem Yohannes, a 23-year-old Ethiopian immigrant, in Biskopsgården where her body was found.

Yohannes was found guilty of Krantz's murder and received a 16-year prison sentence and deportation on release.

== Background ==
On 26 September 2010, Elin Terese Krantz (born 16 August 1983) from Falköping, took the tram home with a friend after an evening enjoying the nightlife of Gothenburg. CCTV footage showed that after her friend got off the tram she was approached and was then followed by a man who attempted to rape her and subsequently beat her to death. Krantz's severely beaten corpse was found the next day in Gothenburg's Biskopsgården district. On 28 September, Ephrem Tadele Yohannes (born 19 December 1987) an Ethiopian citizen with a residence permit with clothes and appearance similar to that of the man captured on the security cameras, was arrested by plainclothes policemen at Gothenburg Central Station. Krantz' DNA was found on his clothing and Yohannes' DNA was found on her body.

== Trial ==
Yohannes was convicted for murder and attempted rape and sentenced to 16 years in prison and subsequent deportation. The first sentence was appealed to the Hovrätt as the accused pleaded innocence. The prosecutor Stina Lundberg argued for a life sentence and aggravated sexual assault. In the autumn of 2011, the Court of Appeals upheld the original sentence. During the Hovrätt court proceeding, news broke that the wife and children of Yohannes had left Europe due to several threats to their lives. The parents of Elin Krantz and her five siblings were awarded criminal damages of around €60,000.

Yohannes was initially imprisoned in Norrtäljeanstalten, a high security prison in Norrtälje, but after attacking a fellow inmate he was transferred to Salbergaanstalten prison in Sala. Yohannes has received several warnings for inappropriate behaviour.

== Aftermath ==
Krantz's body was interred at the Sankt Olof kyrkogård cemetery in her hometown of Falköping. In October 2010, over 1000 people gathered in the district - where her body was found - to commemorate her and to protest the violence.

== See also ==
- Skellefteå assault case
