= Bombings in Sweden =

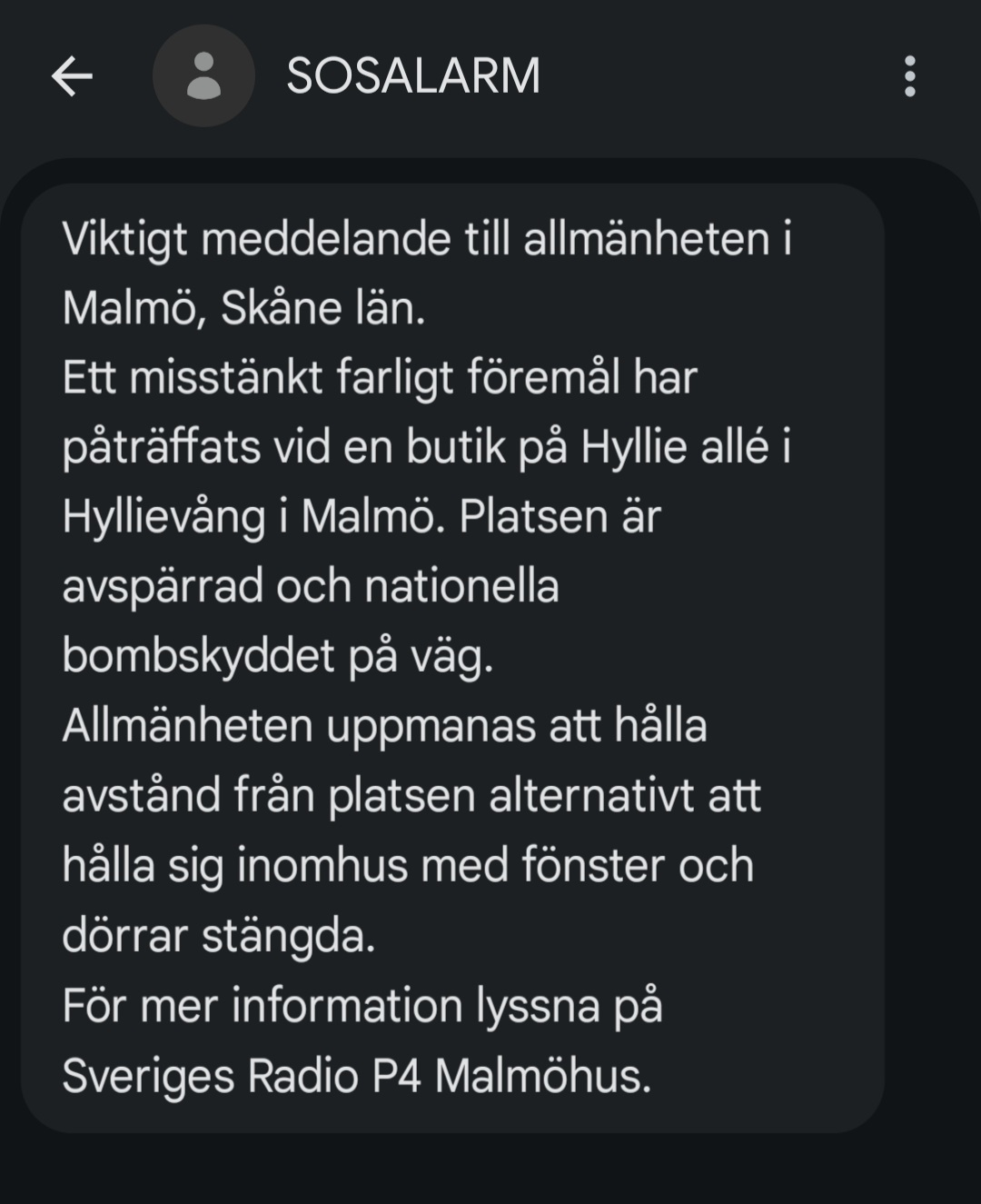
SMS warning about a bomb in Malmö and urging the public to stay indoors.

Bombings in Sweden are attacks and sabotage using explosive devices by criminals in Sweden. The weapons used are weapons such as hand grenades and explosives intended for either civilian or military use. Legal authorities use the term allmänfarlig ödeläggelse genom sprängning (English: damage by explosive blast) and media in Sweden use the shorter term sprängdåd. This crime was not categorized separately prior to 2017. In 2018 there were 162 explosions, and in the first nine months of 2019, 97 explosions were registered, usually carried out by criminal gangs. According to Swedish police commissioner Anders Thornberg in 2019, there is no international equivalent to Sweden's wave of bombings.

Usage of hand grenades reached a significant peak in 2016. According to police in Gothenburg and Malmö in 2016, the use of hand grenades by criminals in Sweden is a phenomenon which is unusual for all comparable countries both inside and outside the EU. According to criminologists Manne Gerell and Amir Rostami, the only other country that keeps track of hand grenade explosions is Mexico. While Mexico has a murder rate 20 times that of Sweden, on the specific category of grenade explosions per capita the two countries were comparable at the time. According to police authorities, many of the hand grenades used are weapons which originate from the Yugoslav Wars, and the hand grenades found by the police are exclusively the ex-Yugoslavian M75 hand grenade.

Explosions have occurred in both rich and low-income areas. Swedish media sometimes are accused of not covering the topic enough, but a 2019 study by polling company Kantar Sifo found that law and order was still the most covered news topic on Swedish TV and radio and on social media.

In 2019, Denmark, worried about the bombings in Sweden, introduced passport controls on its border checkpoints with Sweden for the first time since the 1950s. In September 2019, police in Malmö issued a general warning to be vigilant for explosive devices when walking the city at night.

The country was rocked by a deadly wave of explosions in the weeks of September 2023, many suspected to be linked to a split within the Foxtrot.

== Perpetrators ==
According to police the attackers are part of the same gangs which also increasingly engaged in gun crime leading to a wave in shootings. While there were 17 deadly shootings in 2011, there were 45 in 2018. According to police intelligence chief Linda H Staaf many are members of disadvantaged groups and have grown up in disadvantaged areas.

== Geographic distribution ==
Most of the attacks were earlier recorded in low-income suburbs in Malmö, Gothenburg and Stockholm. In a more recent trend, more affluent districts also experienced attacks, such as a detonation in Bromma.

== Timeline of noted bombings ==
Explosive incidents based on data published by the Swedish Police Authority.

According to a December 2018 Swedish Television interview with researcher Amir Rostami, Sweden has a high number of hand grenade attacks compared to neighbouring countries Denmark, Norway, Poland and Germany. While gun homicides were on the rise in the 2011–2018 time span, according to a study at Malmö University the number of hand grenade attacks had shown a strong increase in the same period and a total of 116 hand grenade detonations were recorded. Rostami said criminologists in Sweden do not know why there was a strong increase and why Sweden has a much higher rate than countries close by.

=== 2012 ===
In 2012 the Swedish National Forensic Centre investigated 88 incidents involving explosives.

=== 2014 ===
- 1 December, Malmö: Malmö District Court was targeted by a bomb attack which was powerful enough to destroy the entrance of the building and also damaged windows and balconies of nearby buildings in a detonation which caused no personal injury. As a result, the decision to place the court building of a volatile city in a residential area was questioned. By October 2017, the crime had not been solved.

=== 2015 ===
- 12 June: four people, including a 4-year-old girl, were killed in a car bomb explosion in Gothenburg. One of the victims was a notorious gang leader.
- 12 June, Malmö: two men are lightly wounded after a detonation in the Seved area.
- 24 July, Malmö: a social welfare office in the south west of Malmö is damaged by a hand grenade.
- 5 August, Trelleborg: a social welfare office is damaged by a hand grenade.

=== 2016 ===
In 2016 police forensic experts reported that the number of annual investigations had increased from 100 to 150 annually in the 2014–2015 time span.

According to Amir Rostami, 2016 saw a record number of hand grenade attacks.

=== 2017 ===
In 2017, the Swedish National Forensic Centre investigated 211 incidents involving explosives, of which 43 involved hand grenades.

- 1 January, Katrineholm, a grenade was thrown at the local police station. The entrance, several windows and three cars parked nearby were damaged.
- 18 October, Helsingborg: a hand grenade destroyed the entrance of the local police station. Forty windows were blown out in the explosion. Chief of police Dan Eliasson called it "an attack on society".
- 27 November, Uppsala: a hand grenade was thrown at a police car outside the local police station. No people were injured, but several cars were damaged in the explosion. One suspect was arrested.

=== 2018 ===
In the first half of 2018, 75 bombings were reported to authorities and the total for the year was 162. Of the 162, 47 were in the Stockholm region and 56 were in the southern region which includes Malmö.

In January 2018, Minister for Justice Morgan Johansson called for an "amnesty" for illegal explosives after the death of bystander Daniel Cuevas Zuniga who was killed by a hand grenade. The "amnesty", where people could hand over grenades to authorities without being prosecuted, had the aim of getting explosive weapons off the streets.

- January, Stockholm: 63-year-old Daniel Cuevas Zuniga had finished working at care home for the elderly and was biking with his wife to buy groceries. On the way he found a hand grenade, thought it was a toy and picked it up. The detonation killed him and wounded his wife.
- 17 January, Rosengård in Malmö: the police station in Rosengård was targeted with explosives. The facade of the building and several vehicles were damaged.
- 8 February, Stockholm: windows were blasted out and a car was damaged when a hand grenade exploded outside the home of a bank employee reported to be involved in uncovering fraud cases and assisting police in cases linked to serious organised crime.
- 20 December, Hässleholm: a pipe bomb was thrown at a school building. A man in his 20s was arrested and later found guilty of damaging public property in the district court. He was also found guilty of for assault, threatening behaviour and child pornography and sentenced to two years and three months in prison.

=== 2019 ===
In the first three months of 2019, there were 48 bombings in Sweden. By June 2019, Malmö and Stockholm had the most bombings. Up until July there were 120 bombings compared to 83 the same period the previous year. Up until 1 November, this represented double the number of detonations compared to the previous year.

Public broadcaster Sveriges Radio published a news item on 1 November entitled Unusually high workload for the national bomb disposal unit. The unit had processed 98 bombings in 2019 up until 1 November.

- April, Motala: a villa was subjected to a bombing. Two persons were in the building but were not seriously injured.
- 15 April, Malmö: a garage door was destroyed by explosives and splinters from the detonation wounded a 12-year-old girl.
- 7 June, Linköping: a detonating explosive device injured 25 people lightly and about a hundred apartments received damage to windows and balconies.
- 12 June, Malmö: an explosive device destroyed the staircase of an apartment building and damaged windows on a nearby apartment.
- 7 August, Landskrona: an explosive device destroyed the entrance of the Landskrona Municipality office building.
- 14 September, Lund: an explosive device detonated outside a grocery store in central Lund. A woman in her 20s passing by was seriously wounded.
- 23 September, Borås: an explosive device detonated and damaged the entrance of Borås Tidning newspaper.
- 12 October, Bromma in western parts of Stockholm: the detonation blew out windows and damaged doors to apartments of a residential building.
- 17 October, three bombings within a few hours of each other in Stockholm:
  - A residential building on Södermalm island. Residents in the building have connections to another building in Bromma which was bombed the previous week.
  - A historic house (Swedish: hembygdsgård) in Vaxholm. The national bomb squad was called to the scene, but was diverted due to the two other attacks in the Stockholm area the same day.
  - An auxiliary building of St. Afrems church in Södertälje was bombed again after two previous bombings during the preceding year.
- 27 October, Helsingborg: a single-family detached home was bombed and the detonation was described as "powerful" by police.
- 1 November,
  - Araby in Växjö: an apartment was targeted by an explosive device which damaged the building. The national bomb squad investigated the crime scene. Araby is a vulnerable area, an area with a higher crime rate.
- Night of 1–2 November, Malmö:
  - At 22:30 building at Drottningtorget, Malmö was damaged by an explosive device.
  - At 01:36 a building in southwest Malmö was targeted by an explosive device which also damaged nearby buildings. Three were arrested.

=== 2020 ===
- 13 January, At 01:09 Östermalm, Stockholm, an explosive device has detonated at the entrance of an apartment block, which destroyed the staircase and blew out all the windows facing the street. Vehicles nearby were destroyed and pushed away by the blast. No human casualties were reported.
- 13 January, At 03:15 Uppsala, an explosive device detonated outside a night club that at the time was closed, which damaged the building and a vehicle parked nearby. No casualties were reported.
- 21 January, At 02:30 Husby, Stockholm, two bombs exploded. One person was injured and walls and windows on surrounding buildings were damaged.
- 21 January, At 22:37 Malmö, an explosive device detonated outside an apartment block entrance. Damage on walls and windows on the house, and as well on surrounding buildings.
- 22 January, At 06:18 a bomb exploded inside an apartment building in Hageby, Norrköping, breaking several windows. According to Aftonbladet the target was a member of the local No Surrender chapter.
- 6 February, an explosion in Borås took place on Thursday evening at the entrance of a dwelling house that broke down the door to the stairwell, and a stockpile of higher glass shattered, resulting in major damage.
- 6 February, At 01:00 there was an explosion at the social services in Helsingborg. It caused damage to the front door, windows and a roof over the entrance.
- 6 February, At 03:30 a car exploded with explosive charge near a house in Södertälje.
- 27 March, the entrance to the staircase of a residential building in Halmstad was destroyed by a bomb and two persons were lightly wounded in the blast. Police took nobody into custody nor identified any suspects.
- 20 August, Gothenburg: a powerful bomb detonated in Majorna district at a residential building and damaged about ten apartments.

=== 2023 ===
- 28 September, A 25-year-old woman was killed by the explosion of a bomb in Storvreta, in the outskirts of Uppsala. The blast also damaged five houses, and destroyed the facades of two of them. The intended target was a gang member living in the same neighbourhood.

=== 2024 ===
Escalation in gang-related violence coincided with a fresh wave of bomb attacks which brought the number of such incidents in the country to 317.

- 31 January: After Stockholm police closed the area around the Israeli Embassy, a National Bomb Squad team destroyed a "live" device, allegedly a hand grenade.

=== 2025 ===
Around 30 bombings took place in Sweden in January 2025. Swedish Prime Minister Ulf Kristersson admitted that his government has lost control over organised-crime violence.

During the month of January, there has been an average of one blast per day.

== See also ==
- List of grenade attacks in Sweden
