= Northern Biskopsgården Church =

Coordinates: 57.7193°N 11.8959°E

- Norra Biskopsgårdens kyrka
- Northern Biskopsgården Church
- Location: Gothenburg
- Country: Sweden

History
- Consecrated: 1970

Administration
- Diocese: Gothenburg
- Parish: Lundby

The Northern Biskopsgården Church (Swedish: Norra Biskopsgårdens kyrka) is a church building in the northern parts of Biskopsgården on the island of Hisingen in Gothenburg, Sweden. Earlier belonging to the Lundby of the Church of Sweden, it was inaugurated in 1970 as a parish home, and taken out of use in 2004 before being transferred to the Gothenburg Ecclesiastical Town Mission and the Finnish Parish.
