= Organized crime in Sweden =

Criminal organizations and activities in Sweden

Although organized crime has always existed in Sweden, it has risen significantly in the 2000s. The number of organized criminal groups operating in the country continues to rise. In 2018, Sweden had the highest gun deaths in total across Europe, and deaths involving guns tripled in Sweden between 2012 and 2020.

== Background ==
Since the 2000s, street gangs in large cities have become more involved in organized crime including shootings and bombings, with 80% of shootings in Sweden occurring in a “criminal environment”, mostly in poorer neighborhoods according to the Swedish National Council for Crime Prevention (2022). As the financial stakes have risen, so have the disputes between gangs.

== History ==
Deaths involving guns tripled in between 2012 and 2020. In 2021, the Swedish teen rapper Einár was shot several times and killed in a suburb of Stockholm. Sweden’s former National Police Commissioner Anders Thornberg told the Financial Times the rising gang violence in Sweden could potentially be a “threat” to its democracy if “certain groups” continue to “stand outside” of society, referring to multicultural people in poorer neighborhoods. In 2015, 10,000 people a week arrived to Sweden from the Middle East.Roots causes of the rise of organized crime are thought to be tied to Sweden's open door immigration policy and lack the integration of these migrants. Sweden's Prime Minister Ulf Kristersson has also blamed "irresponsible immigration policy" for the surge of organized crime. In the last 15 years immigrants made up 53% of people serving long-term prison sentences.

== Known criminal organizations ==
=== Outlaw motorcycle gangs ===
Outlaw motorcycle groups such as the Hells Angels and Bandidos are well-established in Sweden. Their membership is increasing and they are reportedly active in organized criminal activities.

=== Other criminal organizations ===
- Foxtrot – A criminal group based mostly in Uppsala and the Stockholm area in Sweden, led by Rawa Majid. The organization is considered to be well-organized, and has been a major concern for law enforcement agencies in Sweden.
- Södertälje mafia – An Assyrian criminal organization involved in infiltrating the welfare sector and local politics.
- Chosen Ones – A multicultural criminal organization based in Stockholm. Led by the Gambia-born Essa Sallah Kah, it is affiliated with the Hells Angels. Most members are in prison.
- Asir – Criminal organization which consists of criminals from Uppsala, Norrköping, Västerås, and Göteborg. It mostly consists of Assyrians from Turkey and Assyrian, Arab and Kurdish Iraqis. The leader is Süyar Gürbüz an ethnic Assyrian from Turkey.

== Membership ==
In 2025, it was estimated that there are a total of 67,500 connected members to these crime organizations. Which is 5,500 more than the year previously. However, out of these only 17,500 are 'active' members and 50,000 have other ties to the criminal gangs.

== Casualties ==
It is estimated that 196 people have died in shootings in the past 10 years, from the article published in 2025. Before deaths of these kinds were rare in Sweden.

== See also ==
- Crime in Sweden
- List of grenade attacks in Sweden
- Bombings in Sweden
