= Falkagård =

Urban area in Falkenberg, Sweden

Falkagård is a neighbourhood in Falkenberg, Sweden. In addition to multi-family buildings, from one to six storeys high, there is a preschool and a leisure park in the area. The area was built in the late 1980s and early 1990s.

== Crime ==
In 2009, the area was rocked by repeated arson attacks, riots and shootings, which forced the police to request reinforcements from surrounding counties.

On 21 October 2013, a man was shot dead in the area. No one has been convicted of the crime. There has been speculation that the shooting was related to drug trafficking, but that it was the wrong person who fell victim. According to the police, Falkagård became a problem area from a crime point of view in 2015, which in 2016 was classified as a vulnerable area. It was declared a vulnerable area in 2017.
