= Rawa Majid =

Swedish-Turkish criminal

- Born: 12 July 1986 (age 39); Kermanshah, Iran
- Organization: Foxtrot
- Wanted since: 2020

Details
- Country: Sweden

Rawa Majid (Sorani Kurdish: ڕەوا مەجید; born 12 July 1986), known as the Kurdish Fox (Swedish: Kurdiska räven), is an Iraqi Kurdish-Swedish criminal. Since 2018, he has been a resident of Turkey, but Majid has fled on multiple occasions to Iraqi Kurdistan and Iran.

Majid is suspected of being the main leader of the Swedish criminal organisation Foxtrot, which is linked to numerous shootings and bombings in Sweden. The violence has generally involved the Stockholm and Uppsala regions, and was often carried out by underage teenagers. Victims have included children, the relatives of rival criminals, former friends of Majid's, and many unintended targets. Majid is in conflict with several other criminal gangs as well as former Foxtrot members. He has been wanted internationally since 2020 for major drug offenses and the planning of murders, and has been named one of Sweden's most wanted criminals. Majid was detained by Iranian police, near its border with Turkey, on 6 October 2023. However, subsequent reports indicated that he has been released or evaded custody, as he is currently in Iran.

== Biography ==
Majid's parents are from Iraqi Kurdistan, but he was born in Kermanshah, Iran, when they were fleeing Iraq on the way to Sweden during the Iran-Iraq war. The family settled in Uppsala in Sweden when he was one month old.

After Majid served a long prison sentence, his cousin was murdered. Because of the escalating threat Majid then experienced, he was allowed by Swedish authorities to leave Sweden in the summer of 2018, despite being under surveillance and on probation, and has since resided in Turkey. He managed to purchase Turkish citizenship in exchange for investments in 2020 through the Turkish golden visa program, despite being wanted by Interpol. An extradition of Majid from Turkey has been requested by Sweden, but Turkey is strict on refusing to extradite citizens unless they commit crimes in Turkey or have dual citizenships.

Swedish police shared intelligence about an operation to capture Majid with Turkish police, at the highest level, but the intelligence was leaked to members of the Foxtrot criminal network in 2022, according to Swedish police, and thus the operation was made impossible. In September 2023, the Deputy Prime Minister of Sweden threatened to suspend Sweden's financial aid to Turkey if Majid is not extradited, but later retracted the statement. In September 2023, Majid was believed to make an attempt to leave Turkey with a forged Italian passport. A legal process against Majid begun in Turkey, where the Turkish authorities started to investigate whether he had used fraudulent documents.

== Crimes committed by Majid and/or the Foxtrot Network ==
Majid has previously been sentenced to eight years in prison for serious drug offenses and assault on two separate occasions. In the criminal register, he appears for the first time as a 19-year-old, and he has been convicted of, among other things, burglary and cigarette smuggling.

Majid was previously in conflict with the rival Vårby criminal network. On 9 September 2020, a 25-year-old man was shot and killed in the city of Uppsala in what is believed to have been a gang-related attack. The victim is thought to be a member of the Vårby network, and the shooting is believed to have been carried out by members of the Foxtrot network.

The Bandidos is another of the criminal networks that Majid is in conflict with. A 33-year-old man was shot dead on 4 March 2022 just outside Bandido premises. He had probably been mistaken for a Bandido member. Several members of the Foxtrot network have been charged with the murder. Majid is believed to have planned the assassination, but has not gone to trial for the murder because he is absconding in Turkey. Voice recordings show that two weeks later, Majid and an 18-year-old man planned to carry out another murder against the leader of the Bandidos, but the act was interrupted when they were discovered by police detectives. Majid is in custody in his absence on suspicion of preparation for murder. On 6 September 2023, he is believed to have tasked a 17-year-old with blowing up the Bandido premises.

Majid has been in an escalating conflict with the Dalen gang since December 2022, and with its leader Mikael Tenezos, also called The Greek, who resides outside of Sweden. Mikael was arrested in Mexico by Mexican police in Canćun in 2025 or 2026 and sent to Swedish authorities. It started when a 21-year-old switched sides from the Dalen network to the Foxtrot network, and hired teenagers to violently target his former allies from the Dalen network and their relatives in order to take over the local drug market in the city of Sundsvall from them. This caused a cycle of revenge between the Foxtrot and Dalen Network, also in Stockholm. Majid and Foxtrot hired allies from the Bridge Network and the Zero Network as executioners.

An internal conflict within the Foxtrot network has arisen between Majid and a phalanx around his former right-hand man Ismail Abdo, who also resides in Turkey. This has led to a spiral of violence in Sweden and Turkey. Thus, Majid is believed to be in a threefront war at least since 2023. On 2 September 2023, Abdo's mother, a 58 year old woman, was shot and killed in the Gränby area of Uppsala, likely as a revenge for a shooting against Majid and his allies in Turkey. Two teenage boys have been detained on suspicion of having carried out the murder. On 13 September 2023 Majid's mother-in-law was the target of a shooting in Cervin's building in Uppsala, 70 kilometres (43 mi) north of Stockholm. She escaped unharmed.

== See also ==
- Sweden–Turkey relations
