= Vivalla =

District and neighborhood in Örebro, Sweden

Coordinates: 59°18′00″N 15°11′13″E

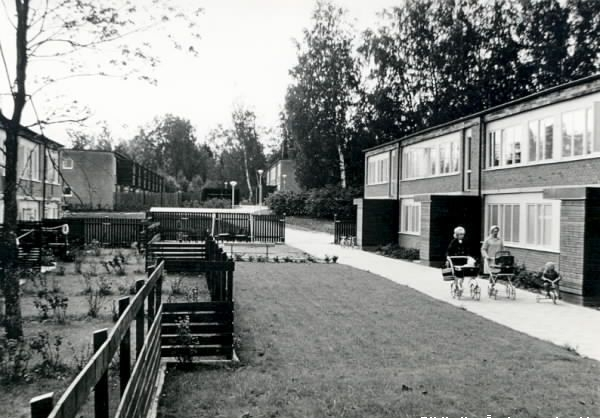
Vivalla in 1968

Vivalla is a district and neighborhood in northwestern part of Örebro, Sweden. The district was built in the 1960s and around 1970 the first people moved in. Most of the inhabitants in the area nowadays are immigrants, the unemployment is substantially higher than in other parts of Örebro, and the Swedish police has classified the district as "särskilt utsatt" (lit. 'particularly vulnerable'), in other words that the district has social problems and problems with crime.
