= Gothenburg car bombing =

2015 vehicle bombing in Gothenburg, Sweden

- Location: Gothenburg, Sweden
- Date: 12 June 2015
- Attack type: Car bombing
- Deaths: 4

On 12 June 2015, four people, including a 4-year-old girl, were killed in a car bombing in Gothenburg, Sweden. The bombing was seen as part of the on-going gang conflicts in the city, as at least one of the victims was identified as a known gang leader.

== Bombing ==
On the Friday evening of 12 June, around 17:00 CEST, a car exploded near a roundabout in Torslanda, Gothenburg. Roads were thereafter closed off, and several witnesses who were in a state of shock were taken care of at a local church in Amhult.

A pre-school child reported to have been one of four killed in the bombing was identified as a 4-year-old girl. The girl was reportedly off on the Friday to go fishing with her father, a 29-year-old who also died in the bombing. The car bombing took place amid an increase of homicides in Sweden, which was described as being "in an extreme situation" compared to other Nordic countries.

== Investigation ==
The attack was seen in the context of retaliatory revenge killings in Gothenburg in recent years. The bombing was in October 2015 changed to be investigated as suspected murder, after it was believed that a bomb had been deliberately placed in the car by people other than those present. All three men were confirmed by police to have been connected to gang conflicts in the city. A 32-year-old man who died in the bombing was confirmed to have been a known Gothenburg gang leader.

In January 2016, a person in their 20s was arrested in suspicion of complicity in the bombing.

== See also ==
- 2015 Gothenburg pub shooting
- List of grenade attacks in Sweden
