= Gun violence in Sweden =

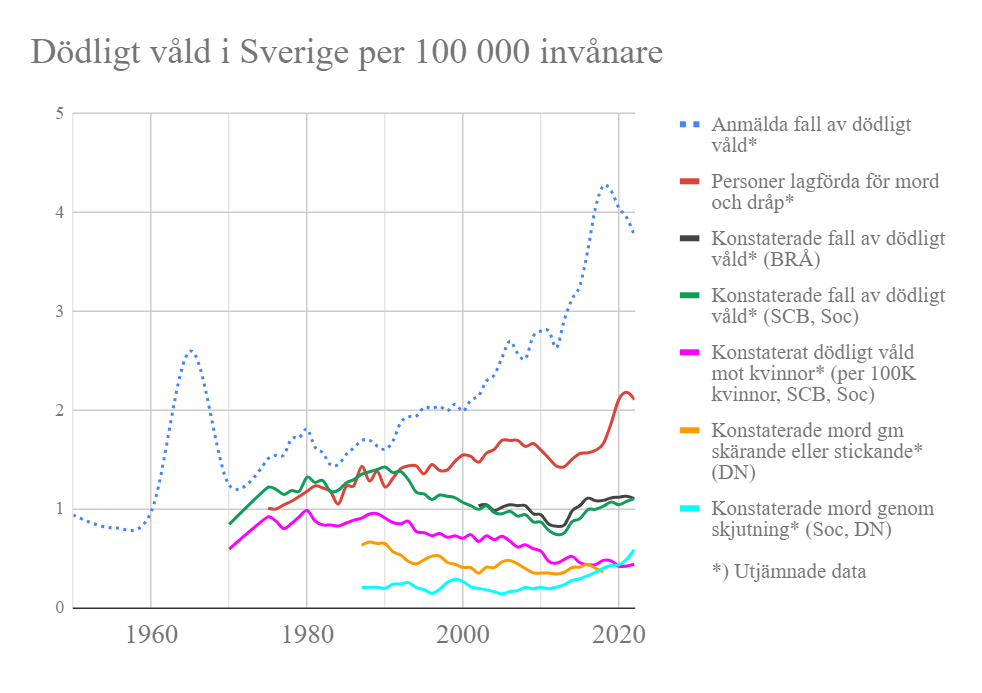
Fatal violence in Sweden (per 100000 over time) since 1975

Gun violence in Sweden (Swedish: skjutningar or gängskjutningar, "gang shootings") increased steeply among males aged 15 to 29 in the two decades prior to 2015. In addition to this rising trend, Sweden is one of the highest countries for gun violence in Western Europe. However since 2022, shootings have decreased significantly, with the police crediting the decrease to newly developed working methods to be able to act more proactively and thus prevent violent crime.

Gun violence started increasing in the mid 2000s and increased more rapidly from 2013 onwards. This sets Sweden apart from most other countries in Europe where there instead has been a decline in gun homicides. In its 2021 report on the phenomenon, the Swedish National Council for Crime Prevention did not analyse the reasons for the trend that occurred in Sweden. Most of the increase is related to gang violence in vulnerable areas in Sweden which are areas with higher crime rates, low income and education, and a large immigrant population.

== Overview ==
Gun violence deaths in Sweden 2006–2025
(2025 includes a figure with and without the Örebro school shooting)
View source data.
View chart definition.
Number of shooting incidents with wounded 2010–2015, per city in the Nordic countries
View chart definition.
Confirmed shootings and wounded 2017-2020

By 2021, gun violence by organized crime had increased tenfold since the early 1990s.

According to a report published by academic researchers in 2017, shooting incidents with fatal outcomes are about 4 to 5 times as common in Sweden compared to neighbouring countries such as Germany and Norway when taking population size into account. The city with the highest prevalence of shootings was Malmö. The grave violence in the studied period also changed character, from criminal motorcycle gangs to city suburbs. Sweden also stands out in having a low resolution rate (25%) for gun homicides compared to Germany and Finland at 90%.

In January 2018, police statistics reported an increase in gun homicides from 8 in 2006 to 43 in 2017. Analysis of 2011–2017 gang warfare showed that there were 1500 incidents involving firearms, 131 people had been killed and 520 injured.

In February 2018, criminologist Jerzy Sarnecki stated in an interview with magazine Forskning & Framsteg that the increasing levels of gun crime in Sweden had taken him, Swedish criminologists in general and police in Sweden by surprise. He characterised the recent developments as "very serious".

A 2018 systematic review of 25 studies on firearm violence in Sweden by criminologist and physician Ardavan Khoshnood, concluded "that even though knives/sharp weapons continue to be the most common MO in a violent crime in Sweden, firearm-related violence is significantly increasing in the country and foremost when discussing gang-related crimes. Moreover, firearm-related homicides and attempted homicides are increasing in the country. The studies also show that a firearm is much more lethal than a knife/sharp weapon... It is principally the three largest cities of Sweden which are affected by the many shootings in recent years."

According to researcher Amir Rostami at Stockholm University, police statistics for January–November 2018 showed that the number of shootings was at a continued high rate at 274, where up until the end of November 42 people had been shot and killed and 129 wounded compared to 43 in 2017.

In 2020, there were 366 incidents of shootings in Sweden where 47 people were killed and 117 were wounded, which represented a 10% increase on the previous year. About half the shooting resulting in killings took place in so-called vulnerable areas and represented an increase on the preceding year.

In 2021, Sweden was found to have the 2nd highest gun homicide rate (after Croatia) out of 22 European countries surveyed. Most other countries surveyed had instead experienced a decline in gun homicides.

According to researcher Amir Rostami in 2021, those responsible for the gun violence are predominantly young men and often second generation immigrants.

By 2023, gun violence in Sweden had risen to 2.5 times the European average. Most of the violence continued to be attributable to an influx of guns, drug dealing, and marginalized immigrant communities.

== Innocent bystanders ==
According to police in 2018, at least nine people who were innocent bystanders had been killed in cross-fire incidents in the last few years and the risk to the public was therefore rising.

In 2017, Minister for Justice Morgan Johansson stated in an interview that the risk to "innocent people" was small.

In the 2011–2020 period, 46 bystanders had been killed or wounded in 36 shooting incidents. Of these, 8 were under the age of 15. According to researcher Joakim Sturup, a contributing factor could be the increased use of automatic firearms.

== See also ==
- Vulnerable areas, areas in Sweden with low socioeconomic development
- Organized crime in Sweden
