= Vulnerable area =

Areas in Sweden with high crime rates and social exclusion

Vulnerable area (Swedish: utsatt område) is a term that has since 2015 been applied by the Swedish Police Authority to areas in Sweden with persistent low socio-economic status, impacted by high rates of criminal activity. Within these areas there are, for example, public acts of violence, open drug dealing, and people showing "open discontent against society".

From 2015 to 2023, the areas were divided into three categories by severity: "vulnerable areas" (utsatta områden), "risk areas" (riskområden), and "particularly vulnerable areas" (särskilt utsatta områden). In December 2025, the "risk area" category was eliminated. According to SVT, Sweden's national public television broadcaster, in "particularly vulnerable areas", parallel societies exist, residents show a reluctance to participate in legal processes, there may be systematic threats and violence against witnesses, and the police have difficulty carrying out their duties. In these latter areas, there may also be extremism, violations of religious freedom, and people traveling to participate in war.

In December 2023, six areas were removed from the list, and four areas were added. Four of the vulnerable areas that remained on the list were downgraded to less serious categories, while one area was upgraded to a more serious category. This brought the total to 59 areas (of which 27 were "vulnerable areas", 15 were "risk areas" and 17 were "particularly vulnerable areas"). In October 2021, there were a total of 61 areas. In June 2019, there were a total of 60 areas. In 2023, around 550,000 people, or 5 percent of the country's population, lived in one of these areas and in 2017, 200,000 people, or 2 percent of the population, lived in "particularly vulnerable areas".

All the areas are situated south of the town of Gävle; however, only 11.4% of Sweden's total population live in the Norrland region, and most are areas constructed during the Million Programme (MP). Although there are towns north of Gävle that have MP areas, they do not experience the crime rate of some southern MP areas.

In April 2019, the publication of the list by police was criticised by municipality politicians as it was stigmatising and dissuaded investors. Police responded that they saw no reason to make the list a secret, and that the list served the purpose of providing a uniform basis of evaluating districts across the country. Interior minister Morgan Johansson stated that the list will continue to be public information.

In June 2019, an update was released by police and three vulnerable areas were reclassified risk areas, two vulnerable areas were removed from the list entirely and a previously unclassified area was added as a vulnerable area. Therefore, the total number of categorised areas decreased from 61 in the 2017 report to 60 in the 2019 update.

Work on improving the areas requires cooperation with several parties like local landlords and organisations, but fear of gentrification may cause problems.

In November 2020, Gothenburg municipality announced they would dedicate SEK 11 billion (about €1.05 billion) towards regenerating the six especially vulnerable areas in the Gothenburg area.

== Characteristics ==
A vulnerable area is described as being geographically defined and having a low socioeconomic status and criminals negatively affecting society. From 2015 to 2023, there were three categories of vulnerable area, divided according to severity: vulnerable areas, risk areas and especially vulnerable areas.

Media has on occasion used the expression "no-go areas", as emergency services such as fire engines and ambulances "on occasion" cannot drive into these areas during an elevated situation without a police escort as they will be attacked by criminal gangs.

The population in these areas have higher rates of unemployment: whereas about 67% of the general population is in employment, the proportion in vulnerable areas is about 49%.

Most stores and shops are small and run by locals, with few major chains.

According to a 2017 report by Swedish Defence University, of those who have travelled from Sweden to conflict zones to participate in terrorist activities, 70% were residents of vulnerable areas.

According to a 2018 report by Sveriges Television, the overall trend is that these areas are improving. Employment rates, income and school results are generally rising.

Vulnerable areas have a low participation in elections: for instance in the Gårdsten district in Gothenburg only a third voted in the 2014 election. Journalists who visited Gårdsten to interview locals on why they didn't vote struggled to complete their task, as many locals they encountered spoke neither Swedish nor English.

By 2018 gang violence, which had long been a feature of vulnerable areas, had begun to spill out into the wider society: hospital staff reported armed confrontations in emergency rooms and school authorities reported that threats and weapons had become commonplace.

=== Vulnerable area ===
An area in the vulnerable category is characterised by a low socioeconomic status; and criminals have a negative impact on society and public institutions. Criminals may use direct threats and blackmail or indirect methods such as public displays of violence which place bystanders at risk of injury or narcotics openly traded in public spaces. The effect of their activities is that inhabitants experience lower levels of security, which may make them less willing to participate or witness in judicial proceedings against criminals.

=== Risk area ===
The risk area category was used from 2015 to 2023. A risk area fulfilled all criteria for a vulnerable area and could become an especially vulnerable area if no interventions were put in. At the end of 2023, these areas numbered 15. The category was removed in December 2025; the police concluded that many areas had remained classified as risk areas for years without escalating, undermining the premise of an "imminent risk", and that the category name was frequently misunderstood as referring to areas at risk of becoming vulnerable rather than areas between vulnerable and especially vulnerable. All 15 former risk areas were reclassified as vulnerable areas; none met the criteria for especially vulnerable.

=== Especially vulnerable area ===
Inhabitants of these areas suffer a potential threat from criminals in the area, which has led to an overall disinclination to participate in judicial proceedings against criminals. In especially vulnerable areas there are systematic threats and violence against witnesses and victims or complainants. These circumstances make it very difficult or impossible for police organisations to complete their mission of law enforcement. In December 2015 these areas numbered 15. In June 2017 this had increased to 23 as some areas were reclassified primarily due to more refined information, not due to a changed situation. By December 2023, the number had decreased to 17, and as of December 2025 there were 19 especially vulnerable areas, though the increase from 17 was due to the subdivision of two previously larger areas rather than any deterioration.

An especially vulnerable area may also experience:

- Parallel society structures exercising their own form of justice and control
- Extremism such as systematic violations of freedom of religion or fundamentalism which circumscribe rights and freedoms of the population. According to Magnus Ranstorp in 2017, Salafi jihadism is present in some of these areas. In the especially vulnerable areas there are individuals among the radical Islamic community who contribute to recruitment and financing of Islamic terrorism. These individuals have access to youth via lectures, study groups or as an imam. Some mosques located in or close to these areas may be a contributing factor to radicalisation.
- inhabitants travelling to conflict areas to participate in combat
- a high concentration of criminals.

Employment levels in February 2017 were around 47%. Many inhabitants are immigrants or children of immigrants. in this category the proportion of immigrants in the district is around 50-60%.

In its 2017, police stated that welfare fraud was prevalent in these areas, where benefits administered by Swedish Public Employment Service and the Swedish Social Insurance Agency were targeted. Police identified that resident registry figures were manipulated, for instance 2% of all apartments in Rinkeby have between 10 and 30 persons registered as residents, which leads to an inflated number of people receiving welfare benefits.

==== Education level in especially vulnerable areas ====
Education levels are lower than the general population in these areas, where 40% of the population has not completed primary education. According to BRÅ statistics, persons with only primary education (Swedish: förgymnasial utbildning) are 5.7 times more likely to be registered for crime compared to persons with post secondary education (Swedish: eftergymnasial utbildning) On average in 2017, less than half of 15-year-olds in Gothenburg especially vulnerable areas qualified for secondary education. In district Bergsjön, 69.8% of 15-year-olds of Bergsjöskolan left primary education without achieving grades in numeracy and literacy to enter secondary education, the number being 67.3% for the Sjumilaskolan school of Biskopsgården district in Gothenburg compared to the national average of 17.5%. The results were lower compared to five years earlier and interpreted as a worsening trend by researcher Anders Trumberg at Örebro university. A high share of preschool staff in vulnerable areas have lacking Swedish language skills.

== Districts ==
From 2015–2023 the districts and their classification were:

V Vulnerable
R Risk area
E Especially vulnerable area

The "risk area" category was removed in 2025. Several areas were split into smaller units for greater precision, resulting in a technical increase from 59 to 65 areas despite only one genuinely new area (Granängsringen) being added and one (Andersberg) being removed.

City/Town	District	2015	2017	2019	2021	2023	2025
Borås	Hässleholmen	Included in Hässleholmen/Hulta below					E
Borås	Hässleholmen/Hulta	R	E	E	E	E	Split (Note: Hässleholmen/Hulta was split in 2025 and Hulta was assessed as not vulnerable.)
Borås	Norrby		E	E	E	E	E
Borlänge	Tjärna Ängar	R	R	R	R	R	V
Eskilstuna	Årby					V	V
Eskilstuna	Fröslunda	V	V	V	V	V	V
Eskilstuna	Lagersberg	V	V	V	V		
Eskilstuna	Skiftinge	V	V	V	V	V	V
Falkenberg	Falkagård	V					
Gothenburg	Hisings Backa	V	V	V	V	V	V
Gothenburg	Rannebergen	V	V	V			
Gothenburg	Biskopsgården	E	E	E	E	R	V
Gothenburg	Bergsjön	E	E	E	E	E	E
Gothenburg	Gårdsten	E	E	R	V	V	V
Gothenburg	Hammarkullen	E	E	E	E	E	E
Gothenburg	Hjällbo	E	E	E	E	E	E
Gothenburg	Lövgärdet	E	E	E	E	E	E
Gothenburg	Tynnered/Grevegården/Opaltorget	V	E	E	R	R	V
Halmstad	Andersberg	V	V	V	V	V	
Helsingborg	Dalhem/Drottninghög/Fredriksdal	R (Note: In 2015, the Helsingborg area was classified under the name "Adolfsberg/Dalhem/Drottninghög." The boundaries and name were subsequently changed to "Dalhem/Drottninghög/Fredriksdal.")	R	R	R	R	V
Helsingborg	Söder		R	R	R	R	V
Jönköping	Råslätt	V	V	V	V	V	V
Kristianstad	Charlottesborg	V	V	V	V		
Kristianstad	Gamlegården	V	V	V	V	V	V
Landskrona	Karlslund	V (Note: In 2015, the Landskrona area was classified under the name "Koppargården." It was subsequently renamed to Karlslund.)	E	E	R	V	V
Linköping	Skäggetorp	E	E	E	E	E	E
Malmö	Holma/Kroksbäck	Included in Holma/Kroksbäck/Bellevuegården below					V
Malmö	Holma/Kroksbäck/Bellevuegården	V	R	R	R	R	Split (Note: Holma/Kroksbäck/Bellevuegården was split in 2025; Bellevuegården was assessed as not vulnerable.)
Malmö	Nydala/Hermodsdal/Lindängen		E	E	E	E	E
Malmö	Rosengård	E	E	E	E	E	E
Malmö	Södra Sofielund	E	E	E	E	R	V
Norrköping	Hageby	V	V			V	V
Norrköping	Klockaretorpet		V	V			
Norrköping	Navestad		V	V	V	V	V
Stockholm	Alby	R (Note: In 2015, Alby and Fittja were classified together as the combined area "Alby/Fittja" (R). They were listed separately from 2017.)	E	E	E	E	E
Stockholm	Brandbergen	V	V	V	V	V	V
Stockholm	Bredäng	V	V	V	V	V	V
Stockholm	Edsberg	V	V	V	V		
Stockholm	Finnsta	V	V	V	V	V	V
Stockholm	Fisksätra				V	V	V
Stockholm	Fittja	R	E	E	E	E	E
Stockholm	Fornhöjden	V	V	R	R	R	V
Stockholm	Granängsringen						V
Stockholm	Grantorp/Visättra				V	V	V
Stockholm	Hagalund					V	V
Stockholm	Hagsätra/Rågsved	V	V	V	V	V	V
Stockholm	Hallonbergen	Included in Rissne/Hallonbergen below					V
Stockholm	Hallunda/Norsborg	E	E	E	E	E	E
Stockholm	Hässelby Gård	Included in Hässelby/Vällingby below					V
Stockholm	Hässelby/Vällingby	V	V	V	V	V	Split (Note: Hässelby/Vällingby was split in 2025 into four areas; Smedshagen, Hässelby Strand, and Grimsta were assessed as not vulnerable.)
Stockholm	Hjulsta	Included in Rinkeby/Tensta below					V
Stockholm	Hovsjö	V	V	R	R	E	E
Stockholm	Husby	E	E	E	E	E	E
Stockholm	Jordbro		V	V	V	V	V
Stockholm	Geneta	Included in Ronna/Geneta/Lina below					E
Stockholm	Lina	Included in Ronna/Geneta/Lina below					V
Stockholm	Rinkeby	Included in Rinkeby/Tensta below					E
Stockholm	Rinkeby/Tensta	E	E	E	E	E	Split (Note: Rinkeby/Tensta was split in 2025 into Rinkeby (especially vulnerable), Tensta (especially vulnerable), and Hjulsta (vulnerable).)
Stockholm	Rissne	Included in Rissne/Hallonbergen below					V
Stockholm	Rissne/Hallonbergen	V	V	R	R	R	Split (Note: Rissne/Hallonbergen was split in 2025 into Rissne (vulnerable) and Hallonbergen (vulnerable).)
Stockholm	Ronna	Included in Ronna/Geneta/Lina below					E
Stockholm	Ronna/Geneta/Lina	E	E	E	E	E	Split (Note: Ronna/Geneta/Lina was split in 2025 into Ronna (especially vulnerable), Geneta (especially vulnerable), and Lina (vulnerable).)
Stockholm	Saltskog					V	V
Stockholm	Sigtuna/Valsta				R	R	V
Stockholm	Sångvägen	V	V	V	V	V	V
Stockholm	Skogås	V	V	V	V	V	V
Stockholm	Smedby	V	V				
Stockholm	Storvreten			V	V	V	V
Stockholm	Tensta	Included in Rinkeby/Tensta above					E
Stockholm	Termovägen	V	V	V	V		
Stockholm	Tureberg	R	R	R	R	R	V
Stockholm	Vårberg						V
Stockholm	Vårby		V	V	V	V	V
Stockholm	Älvsjö/Solberga	V	V	V	V		
Stockholm	Östberga	V	V	V	V		
Trollhättan	Kronogården/Lextorp/Sylte	V	V	V	R	R	V
Uppsala	Valsätra	V	V	V	V		
Uppsala	Gottsunda	V (Note: In 2015, Gottsunda was classified together with Valsätra as the combined area "Gottsunda/Valsätra" (V). The area was split from 2017, with Gottsunda classified as especially vulnerable and Valsätra remaining vulnerable.)	E	E	E	R	V
Västerås	Bäckby	V	V	V	V	V	V
Växjö	Araby	E	E	E	R	R	V
Örebro	Oxhagen	Included in Oxhagen/Varberga below					V
Örebro	Oxhagen/Varberga	R	R	R	R	R	Split (Note: Oxhagen/Varberga was split in 2025 into Oxhagen (vulnerable) and Varberga (vulnerable).)
Örebro	Varberga	Included in Oxhagen/Varberga above					V
Örebro	Vivalla	E	E	E	E	E	E
Number of vulnerable areas: V		32	32	28	28	27	46
Number of risk areas: R		6	6	10	14	15	0 (Note: The risk area category was removed in 2025. All former risk areas were reclassified as vulnerable areas; none met the criteria for especially vulnerable.)
Number of especially vulnerable areas: E		15	23	22	19	17	19
Totals:		53	61	60	61	59	65

== See also ==
- Vulnerable residential area - a similar classification for areas in Denmark
- Sensitive urban zone - a similar classification for areas in France
- Sozialer Brennpunkt - a similar classification for areas in Germany
- Organized crime in Sweden
- Law enforcement in Sweden
- Welfare in Sweden
- Crime in Sweden
