= Foxtrot (criminal network) =

Criminal network in Sweden

Foxtrot Network
- Founding location: Sweden
- Territory: Uppsala and Stockholm, Sweden; Ankara, Turkey; Oslo and Trondheim, Norway
- Ethnicity: Various (including Kurds and Yazidis)
- Membership: 10 members and dozens of cooperating smugglers, drug distributors and enforcers
- Leader: Rawa Majid
- Activities: Illegal drug trade, weapons trafficking, murder, terrorism and recruitment
- Allies: Kurdish mafia, Moroccan mafia, Bro Network, Zero Network
- Rivals: Dalen Network, Farsta crew

Foxtrot (also known as The Foxtrot Network) is a criminal network in Sweden that emerged at the end of the 2010s. The network is Sweden's main distributor of narcotics. Rawa Majid, also known as the Kurdish Fox, is the ringleader of the network, which now maintains direct operational ties to Iranian regime.

The network has been linked to violent incidents in several countries, including murders, bombings, and assaults.

== Rawa Majid ==
The leader of the network is Rawa Majid (aka the Kurdish Fox), a Swedish-Kurd from Uppsala whose family immigrated to Sweden when he was a few months old. Since August of 2020, he has been wanted internationally for drug-related crimes and as an accomplice to murder. Majid, along with other Foxtrot members, has purchased Turkish citizenship in order to avoid Swedish police whilst being able to control the network from Turkey. Turkey refuses to send him to Sweden, stating his citizenship. The latest reports locate him on the border area between Iran and Iraq.

Nine men linked to Majid were indicted on felony drug and felony weapons charges in late December 2022.

== Members ==
The Foxtrot network is linked to gun crime and violence in Sweden. It consists primarily of people between the ages of 25 and 35 and includes several of Majid's relatives. The network is considered to be well organized, and has been a major concern for law enforcement agencies in Sweden. It typically targets for recruitment the financially vulnerable, such as newly immigrated families, the young, and people diagnosed with autism or struggling with mental health issues.

== Relations with Iran ==
Foxtrot has developed direct operational ties with the Iranian regime, specifically Iran's Ministry of Intelligence and Security (MOIS). These connections have been substantiated by multiple Western government investigations and recent coordinated sanctions by the US, UK, and other European states. Rawa Majid was recruited by Iran's MOI after fleeing to Iran in September 2023. In exchange for protection and safe haven in Tehran, Majid agreed to use his network to carry out attacks on Israeli and Jewish targets across Europe. Under Iranian direction, Foxtrot orchestrated and attempted several attacks.

== Relations with other networks ==
The Foxtrot network has been connected to a number of other suspects in organized crime, including a man who is regarded as one of Majid's closest friends. In April 2022, this man was given a prison sentence of 9 years and 6 months for serious drug offences.

A man who was detained in 2021 in connection with a sizable drug trade is thought to be a third person connected to the Foxtrot network. The man is alleged to have connections to other criminal organizations in Europe and to have been involved in the importation of significant amounts of drugs from the Netherlands, Sweden and to Norway.

Foxtrot and Majid also have connections to a large drug ring in Östersund.

Additionally, it has been established through numerous investigations that the Foxtrot Network is allied with the Bro-network and Zero Network. People hired by the Foxtrot network and Majid have committed several violent crimes against the Dalen Network and their allies. The perpetrators were recruited from other criminal networks and were partially members of the Bro-Network or the Zero Network. the Dalen Network, which appears to be affiliated with Farsta yngre among other things, has also committed a number of violent acts against the Foxtrot network and its allies.

== In the media ==
Gangster rapper "5iftyy" (born 2001), originally from the Bro-Network, is also linked by the Swedish police to the Foxtrot network. The rapper has also referred to the network in several songs and paid tribute to members who have been imprisoned.

== International activities ==
The Foxtrot network is reported to recruit teenagers in several countries to commit violent crimes including murder as a service to paying clients—violence as a service (VaaS)—often on behalf of the Iranian regime. A Europol group, OTF GRIMM, was set up to address VaaS, involving Belgium, Denmark, Finland, France, Germany, Iceland, the Netherlands, Norway, Spain, Sweden, and the United Kingdom.

The Foxtrot network often avoids paying out, as perpetrators are usually caught. From 2022 to 2026 it is thought to have been responsible for about 35 murders, and actual and attempted attacks on Israeli targets in Europe.

On 12 March 2025, the U.S Department of the Treasury sanctioned Foxtrot and its leader Rawa Majid over "attacks on Israeli and Jewish targets in Europe." In April 2025 the Government of the United Kingdom sanctioned the Foxtrot Network due to its criminal activities.

On 13 January 2026, Iraqi authorities announced the arrest of leadership figures associated with the Sweden-based Foxtrot Network. A statement issued by the Iraqi National Intelligence Service said "Based on precise intelligence information and internal and external tracking operations, the National Intelligence Service, in coordination with the Supreme Judicial Council and security authorities in Sulaymaniyah Governorate in the Iraqi Kurdistan Region, apprehended criminal leaders subject to domestic and international arrest warrants who are affiliated with the Foxtrot Network."

== See also ==
- Organized crime in Sweden
- Iran and state-sponsored terrorism
- Iranian external operations
- 2024 Iranian operations inside Australia
