= Biskopsgården =

District of Gothenburg, Sweden

Coordinates: 57.713°N 11.892°E

Biskopsgården (literally, "Bishop Manor") is a district (stadsdelsnämndsområde) in Gothenburg Municipality, in western Sweden.

== History ==
The first traces of humans can be found by the hillsides that were once beaches in an archipelago.

The border between Sweden and Norway went through Biskopsgården from the 13th century until 1658, when Bohuslän belonged to Sweden. One of the old yards, Biskopsgården, was used when the Bishop came to visit. Its area stretched up to the mountains over the current Biskopsgården, and it is from there that it got its name.

In the middle of the 1950s, an expansion of Biskopsgården was started. Around 1958, people, such as authors and professors, moved to Biskopsgården. After the labor migration on 1950s and 1960s, Biskopsgården acquired an immigrant character. The proportion of professionals was higher than average, as well as average earnings. During the 1980s and 1990s, Biskopsgården had changed and renewed. Today, Biskopsgården has improved due to reparation, as well as social and cultural investments. On January 1, 2011, Biskopsgården and Torslanda joined together and formed Western Hisingens district. In Gothenburg the number of district has been halved to ten.

In 2005, Biskopsgården was one of the areas, together with northeastern Gothenburg, where a large share of Somalis resident in Gothenburg lived which led to the drug khat being openly sold in public spaces.

In its December 2015 report, the Swedish Police designated the area an "especially vulnerable area", the most severe category of urban areas with high crime rates.

== Living and population ==
=== Demographics ===
Biskopsgården has approximately 12,750 dwellings. The majority of dwellings were constructed during the 1950s. In the spring of 2007, a program for new dwellings was approved by the building committee. The population of the district is approximately 25,600 (2008). The population has decreased a lot since the 1960s, then the population was above 37,000. The district is close to a large green area and major thoroughfares. In the 2011-13 period, about 55% of the population originated outside the EU and the Nordic countries. The inhabitants of western parts of Biskopsgården district have a low level of education, where 16% have a post secondary education of 3 years or above which is low compared to the rest of Gothenburg. About a third of school pupils leave mandatory 9-year school without qualifying for secondary education, compared to a fifth for Gothenburg as a whole. The employment rate is 56%, which is low compared to Gothenburg but slightly higher than vulnerable areas Bergsjön and Angered. Conversely, the proportion of households receiving social welfare support is high. Participation in the 2010 council election was low at 62%.

=== Development ===
Further development of Biskopsgården will need to reduce the isolated nature of the area to more closely integrate it with the rest of the city. The district has gone through major changes during its lifetime. An example on this is that; the ethnic diversity has increased; some of the blocks have been renovated or rebuilt. The Live-good process was started in 1993, a unique development forum, with the purpose of improving the district for the resident. The vision of the Live-good process is to have attractive preschool/school, better marketing, safety, own supply, good housing, and collaboration and accommodation dialogue.

The district has three large business squares, Länsmanstorget, Vårväderstorget and Friskväderstorget that are natural meeting places for the residents. The squares have a variety of small shops. Biskopsgården have large planned neighbor areas used as natural meeting places for residents. Svarte Mosses has a large green area that gives the possibility to have activity meeting-places, such as barbecue places, café, nature pathways, miniature golf, and other sports activities.

The district has a geographical central location, with three tram services that connect the area with the city centre. The trams leaves every five minutes and it takes approximately 15 minutes to travel to the city.

=== Education ===
In Biskopsgården there are 5 schools, one in each primary area. Ryaskolan. In South and North Biskopsgården there are two properties with housing and daytime activities for older children. There is also two youth recreation centres and one library. There are 80 compounds that are working in the district. About 50 compounds are focused on culture, politics and hobbies, 20 are sports associations and about 15 are pensioners associations.

In 2018, kindergartens in Biskopsgården district were reprimanded by the Municipality of Gothenburg after Göteborgs-Posten newspaper had found out that 4 out of 5 kindergartens stated they were willing to allow girls in their care to wear the Islamic hijab if the parents requested it. Following this finding, staff at 14 preschools and 4 primary schools in Biskopsgården were then educated about promoting children's rights, promote integration and prevent honor-related violence and oppression.

=== Business ===
In Biskopsgården you can find everything from restaurants and barber shops to machine shops and printers. Today there are 966 registered companies in Biskopsgården. However Biskopsgårdens industry association was created in 1977. There is an industry area and a small business consisting of 70 companies in the South Biskopsgården. The industry area has looked the same the last 15 years.

=== Crime ===
Biskopsgården has witnessed gang violence including gun murders and car bombs. A low point was on 18 March 2015 when two men shot into a restaurant with assault rifles, killing two and injuring ten. Both the targets and perpetrators were involved in large-scale drug crime, save for a murdered bystander. In the aftermath police installed 15 security cameras in the area from December 2016 until July 2018.

Biskopsgården has since 2015 been classified as an "especially vulnerable area" (Swedish: särskilt utsatt område) by the Swedish Police, which is defined as an area where criminals have an influence on society and it is hard or impossible for the police to fulfill its role. In June 2021, a police officer was shot and killed in the district, marking only the country's third killing of a police officer in 20 years.
