= Gang violence in Sweden =

Organized crime in Sweden

- Part of Organized crime in Sweden
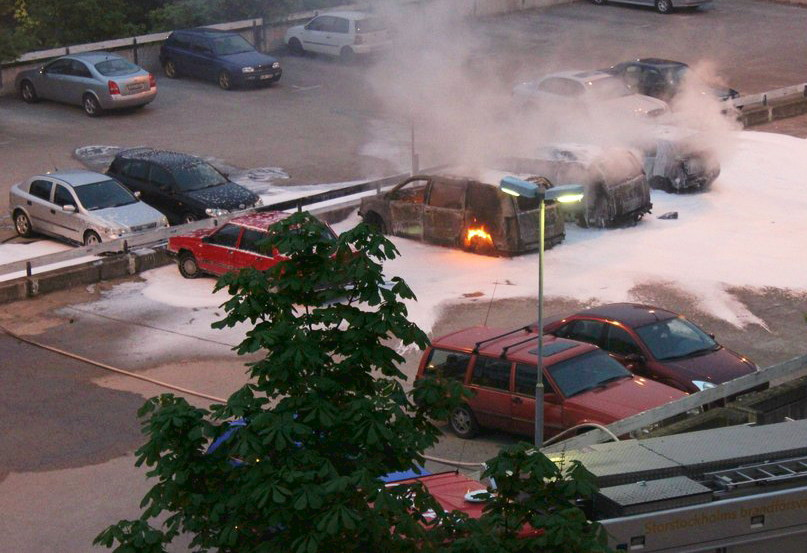
- Burning cars in Husby, 2013.
- Date: 1990's – present
- Location: Sweden
- Caused by: Income inequality in Sweden, Residential segregation, Immigration to Sweden

Parties
| Sweden; Swedish Police; Swedish Security Service; Denmark; Police of Denmark; Norway; Norwegian Police; Finland; Police of Finland; (European Union) Europol Mossad | Gangs; Foxtrot; Södertälje mafia Vårbynätverket; Naserligan; Original Gangsters; Black cobra Dödspatrullen; Fucked For Life; Satudarah MC; Hells Angels MC; Bandidos MC; X-Team Supported by: Iran; Turkey |

Lead figures
| (Sweden) Ulf Kristersson (Sweden) Gunnar Strömmer (Sweden) Petra Lundh | Rawa Majid; Ismail Abdo; Mustafa Aljiburi †; Chihab Lamouri; Maykil Yokhanna; Naser Dzeljilji; Denho Acar; Mohamed Abdigahni Ali; Mustafa Mohammed; Abdisamed Dahir Ahmed; Zakaria Amin |

Number
| 2025: Police officers: 24,746; Civilians: 15,909; Total: 40,655 | 2025: 17,500 are 'active' members, while 50,000 have other ties to the criminal gangs.; Total: 67,500 Gang-affiliated members. |

Casualties and losses
- 366 killed since 2018; 798 injured since 2018; 2,532 shootings since 2018; 382 detonated bombs since 2023

Gang violence in Sweden refers to criminal activities and violent conflicts primarily involving organized crime groups and street gangs operating within the country. Over the past two decades, Sweden has experienced a notable increase in gang-related incidents, including shootings, bombings, and other forms of violence, particularly in urban areas such as Stockholm, Gothenburg, and Malmö. These developments have raised significant public concern and prompted debates about immigration, social integration, policing strategies, and criminal justice reforms. The Swedish government and law enforcement agencies have implemented various measures to address the issue, though gang violence remains a complex and evolving challenge.

== Background ==
Although organized crime has always existed in Sweden, it has risen significantly in the 2000s. The number of organized criminal groups operating in the country continues to rise. In 2018, Sweden had the highest gun deaths in total across Europe, and deaths involving guns tripled in Sweden between 2012 and 2020.

Since the 2000s, street gangs in multicultural areas of large cities have become more involved in organized crime including shootings and bombings, with 80% of shootings in Sweden occurring in a “criminal environment” mostly in poorer multicultural neighborhoods according to the Swedish National Council for Crime Prevention (2022). As the financial stakes have risen, so have the disputes between gangs.

The actors within organized crime are usually geographically mobile. This means that organized crime committed in Sweden is to a large extent carried out by individuals who reside in another country or in a different location from where the crime takes place. Many of the crimes associated with organized crime are also transnational in nature, since smuggling and money laundering are widespread. The internet is often used in the commission of these crimes. Prostitution is also commonly organized through criminal networks.

Gang-related crime is economically burdensome for society. According to a 2012 estimate by Eva Lundmark-Nilsson and Ingvar Nilsson, commissioned by CIDES, one gang member was estimated to cost society 23 million SEK over 15 years. An organized criminal gang consisting of 15 individuals costs society 400 million SEK over 15 years when the costs for public protection are included.

=== Nordic Biker War ===
The Nordic Biker War was a gang war that began in January 1994 and continued until September 1997 in parts of Scandinavia and Finland, involving the Hells Angels and Bandidos outlaw motorcycle clubs. The conflict arose from disputes over territory and organized crime rackets, as well as personal feuds within the biker subculture. Specifically, the members of both groups sought a monopoly on the right to engage in crime in certain geographical areas. The war resulted in the killings of nine gang members, with shootings and bombings totalling another 74 attempted murders. The bikers utilized car bombs, machine guns, hand grenades, an anti-tank rocket, and small arms during their gang war, and assassination attempts were even made inside prisons. The majority of the hostilities took place in or around Copenhagen in Denmark, Helsinki in Finland, Oslo in Norway, and Helsingborg in Sweden.

The biker war was also costly for the police, who struggled to put an end to the murders. In overtime for police officers alone, the cost was set at around 50–75 million kroner. On 15 October 1996, a bill, known as the Rockerloven ("Rocker Act") in the media, was passed in the Folketing (Danish Parliament) which allows the police to evict motorcycle gangs from their headquarters. As a result of the 1996–1997 period of the conflict alone, 138 people were sentenced to a total of 240 years in prison. Several of those convicted were given life imprisonment for murder and attempted murder. Specific wings for motorcycle gang members were created at Vridsløselille Prison and Horsens State Prison. Significant improvements were also made to the security of military weapons depots as a result of the Nordic Biker War after several burglaries.

The conflict effectively came to an end in the summer of 1997 when the two sides reached a peace agreement, with the well-known defence lawyer Thorkild Høyer as mediator. On 25 September 1997, Bent Svane Nielsen of the Hells Angels and then-Bandidos president Jim Tinndahn announced during a press conference that the rival clubs had ended their war. Nielsen stated "We cannot give guarantees that there will be no more incidents, but we can actively intervene and ensure that those who defy the cooperation agreement are excluded from our biker culture."

== Events ==
For much of the late 20th century, Sweden was internationally regarded as a country with high public safety, social equality, and living standards. During the 2010s, however, Sweden experienced a sharp increase in organized crime, gang-related shootings, and bombings, significantly altering domestic and international perceptions of public security in the country.

By the early 2020s, Sweden had one of the highest rates of bomb attacks and shootings in Europe.

=== Rise in Shootings and Bombings ===
Gang-related shootings increased steadily throughout the 2010s, reaching a peak of 363 recorded shootings in 2023.

Explosive violence escalated sharply during the same period. In January 2025 alone, Swedish police recorded 37 bombings nationwide, an intensity unmatched in any Western country not at war.

Authorities reported that a growing proportion of perpetrators were minors, recruited by criminal networks to exploit Sweden’s juvenile justice framework.

=== Immigration, Segregation, and Integration ===
From the 1990s onward, Sweden adopted one of Europe’s most liberal asylum and immigration policies, receiving large numbers of refugees from conflict zones in Africa and the Middle East.

By 2023, approximately 31% of Sweden’s population was foreign-born, the highest proportion in Europe.

Research institutions and government agencies reported that residential segregation increased significantly during the same period, with many migrants concentrated in economically disadvantaged neighborhoods characterized by higher unemployment and crime rates.

By September 2024, Swedish police had designated 59 areas as “particularly vulnerable,” citing difficulties in maintaining public order and reduced trust in authorities.

=== Emergence of Organized Gangs ===
By the early 2020s, authorities estimated that approximately 200 criminal gangs operated in Sweden, involving around 62,000 individuals. Most identified gang members were men, and a majority had foreign backgrounds.

Political debate surrounding gang crime intensified amid criticism that concerns had previously been downplayed due to fears of stigmatizing migrant communities.

=== Dödspatrullen and Shottaz ===
Sweden’s first widely recognized gang war began in 2015 in Rinkeby, Stockholm, involving two gangs later known as Death Patrol (3MST) and Shottaz. The conflict followed a series of armed robberies, including a jewellery store robbery in Kista in May 2015 and a Forex office robbery in Täby in July 2015.

Internal disputes escalated into lethal violence. On 22 July 2015, a gang member known as Izzy was shot and killed. The following night, another central figure, Maslah, was killed in a retaliatory ambush, marking a turning point toward public shootings as a recurring phenomenon.

=== Expansion and Internationalization of Crime ===
During the late 2010s, Swedish gangs expanded operations internationally, particularly in drug trafficking. Death Patrol established ties with the Moroccan-linked criminal group Los Suecos, smuggling narcotics into Sweden via Spain.

In 2016, police seized 28 kilograms of amphetamine linked to the group, but most suspects avoided long prison sentences due to limitations in Swedish conspiracy laws.

A contract killing in Uppsala in 2017 involving a protected witness highlighted the increasing sophistication of organized crime and contributed to declining witness cooperation nationwide.

=== Use of Child Recruits ===
Criminal networks increasingly exploited Sweden’s juvenile justice system, in which children under 15 cannot be prosecuted and older minors are typically placed in youth care facilities rather than prisons.

Between 2018 and 2023, multiple high-profile cases involved minors carrying out murders or bombings, including shootings in Rinkeby, Stockholm, and attacks using explosives in Farsta and Nyköping.

In 2023, police disrupted a plot in which an 11-year-old boy had been recruited online to commit murder, the youngest documented case of its kind in Sweden.

=== Online Recruitment and Criminal Subculture ===
Gangs increasingly relied on encrypted messaging platforms such as Telegram and Signal to recruit minors, often offering payment for violent crimes. Investigations showed that children could receive criminal assignments within hours of joining such groups.

Authorities shut down several large recruitment channels in 2024, though new groups quickly emerged, illustrating the adaptability of criminal networks.

=== Foxtrot Network ===
The Foxtrot Network emerged in the late 2010s as one of Sweden’s most powerful criminal organizations, dominating drug trafficking through extreme violence. Its leader, Rawa Majid, coordinated operations from abroad after leaving Sweden in 2018.

In November 2021, Swedish police identified Majid as a central figure following encrypted communications leaks during Operation Kurdish Fox. He was arrested in Turkey in April 2022 but avoided extradition after obtaining Turkish citizenship.

=== Extortion and Bombings ===
Explosive attacks became a routine method of intimidation. In 2023, bombings targeting a real estate company in Linköping caused damage estimated at $7–8 million, displacing hundreds of residents.

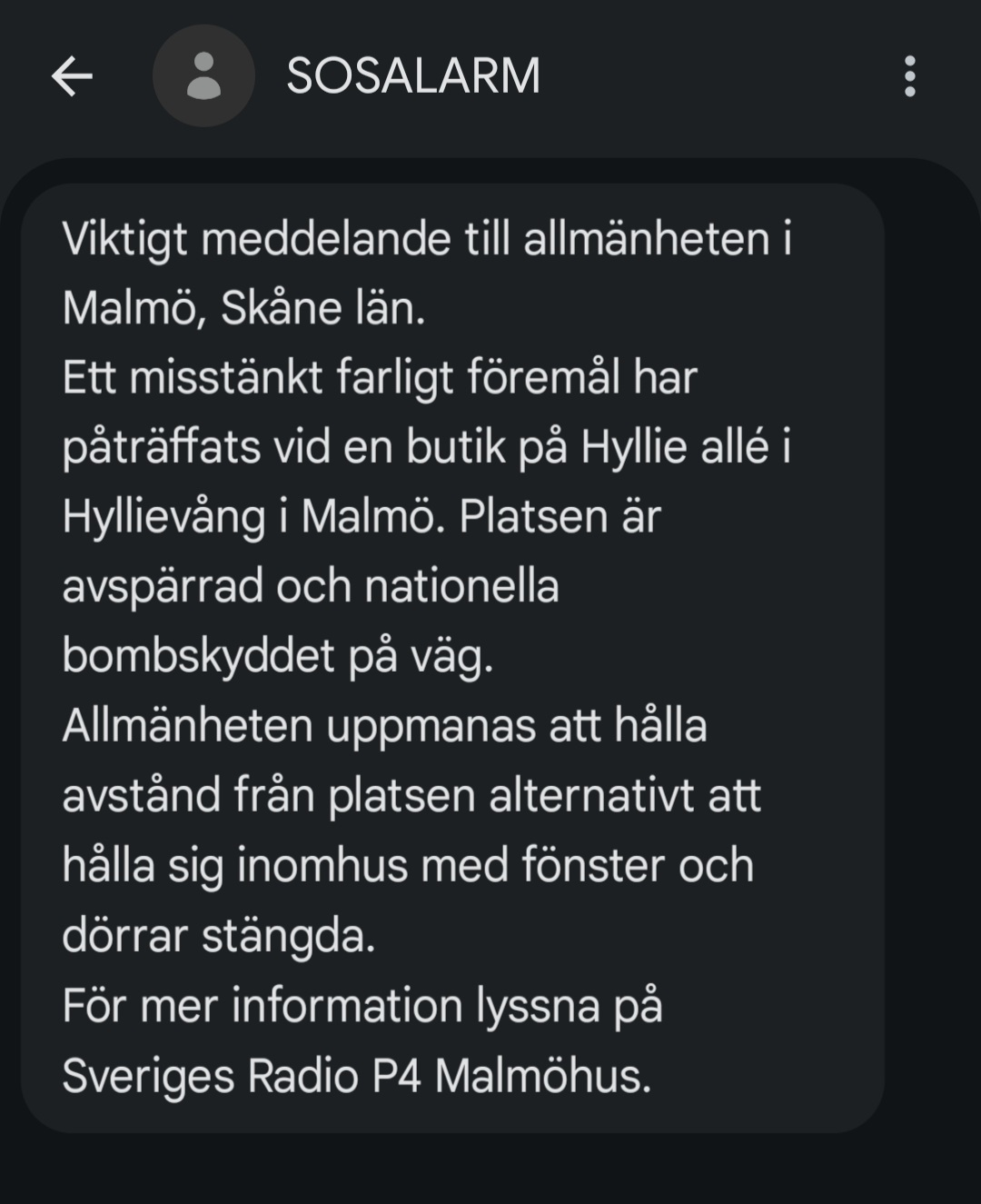
SMS warning about a bomb in Malmö and urging the public to stay indoors.

A national survey found that one in five Swedish companies had been threatened by organized crime groups.

=== Murders of Minors ===
Several cases in 2023 involved the killing of minors linked to gang activity. In September, 13-year-old Milo was found shot dead in Haninge after reportedly witnessing gang-related crime.

Later the same year, two 14-year-olds, Layth al-Azzawi and Mohamed Suleiman, were kidnapped, tortured, and murdered after attempting to withdraw from a Foxtrot Network assignment. Eighteen individuals were later charged in connection with the killings.

=== Internal Conflict Within Foxtrot ===
In late 2023, a power struggle erupted between Rawa Majid and his former associate Ismail Abdo, leading to retaliatory assassinations and bombings. One of the largest explosions occurred in Uppsala on 27 September 2023, killing 24-year-old teacher Soha Saad and destroying multiple homes.

In January 2024, Foxtrot lieutenant Mustafa “Benzema” Aljiburi was killed in Iraq by Swedish nationals. The perpetrators were sentenced to death, later commuted to life imprisonment following diplomatic intervention.

=== Alleged Iranian Involvement and Terrorism ===
By 2024, intelligence agencies reported that Iran had recruited Swedish criminal networks, including Foxtrot, to carry out attacks on Israeli and Jewish targets in Europe.

Incidents included attacks or attempted attacks against Israeli diplomatic and defense facilities in Stockholm, Gothenburg, and Copenhagen between January and October 2024.

In March 2025, the United States designated the Foxtrot Network a transnational criminal organization and sanctioned Rawa Majid for terrorism-related activities.

=== Political Response ===
Following the 2022 general election, Sweden formed its most right-wing government to date. Prime Minister Ulf Kristersson declared gang violence a national emergency and proposed reforms including criminalizing gang membership, expanding police powers, and revoking citizenship for convicted gang members.

The proposed reforms remain politically contested and are expected to take years to fully implement.

== Notable deaths ==
- Einár
- C.Gambino
- Ratko Đokić
- Gaboro
- Dragan Joksović
- Michael Ljunggren
- Murder of Mikael Janicki
- Eddie Moussa
- Murder of Daniel Wretström
- 2022 Emporia mall shooting
- Gothenburg car bombing
- Gothenburg pub shooting
- 2025 Uppsala shooting
- Rinkeby murder
- Murder of Adriana Naghei Ostrowska
