= X-Team =

Street gang

- X-Team logo
- Founded: 1997
- Founding location: Denmark
- Years active: 1997–present
- Territory: Denmark, Finland, Germany, Norway, Sweden, Russia, Ukraine, Lithuania, France, Spain, Brunei, England and Grenada
- Ethnicity: Various, mainly Danes, Swedes, Norwegians, Finns, Germans
- Membership: 350 members (in 2002)
- Activities: Drug trafficking, extortion, robbery, assault, murder
- Allies: Bandidos
- Rivals: Original Gangsters; Red & White Crew; Södertäljenätverket; Gremium MC; Mexican Team Work

X-Team is a gang associated with the Bandidos Motorcycle Club. Members are not required to own a motorcycle, and the group is essentially a street gang recruiting young criminals to provide reinforcements for the club. X-Team members carry out crimes on behalf of the Bandidos, such as debt collection and drug dealing, which allows the club to distance itself from violence and crime.

== Denmark ==
X-Team was founded in Denmark in 1997 following the Nordic Biker War. The gang had approximately twenty-five chapters and 350 members in the country at peak strength circa 2002 but the X-Team in Denmark was eventually disbanded after the Bandidos lost control of the gang's members. The Bandidos later former another youth branch called Mexican Team Work.

An X-Team member was arrested on a motorway near Hillerød and found to be in possession of two-and-a-half kilograms of amphetamine. Police stopped the man after observing him being handed the amphetamine by another man, who in turn had obtained the drugs from a Dutchman. Police later found sixteen kilograms of cocaine being stored by the Dutchman at a derelict pub in Nørrebro, Copenhagen. A total of five people were taken into custody in October 2000 in connection with the drug ring.

X-Team became involved in a conflict with an immigrant gang in Ishøj in December 2000. A group of between ten and thirty immigrants shot at five X-Team members at an inn on 25 April 2001. On 13 June 2001, three of those who had been shot at were part of a group of five who were arrested in possession of firearms, including a shotgun and a hunting rifle, and a bag of ammunition.

Several members provided logistical support to the killers of Claus Bork Hansen, a former Bandidos member who was shot dead in Vanløse, Copenhagen on 21 March 2001 after being expelled from the club amid an internal dispute.

In May 2001, two members were convicted in Taastrup of extortion, theft, trafficking in cocaine and amphetamine, and unlawful possession of machine guns and assault rifles.

X-Team members Mads Thorsen and Ken Olsen were each sentenced to a year in prison after being convicted of violence, extortion, threats and drug trafficking in Vordingborg in July 2001. The crimes related to threats and violence carried out against a former X-Team member and his girlfriend, who owed Olsen and Thorsen money for drugs which had been given to them for resale. The man was beaten at an apartment in Stege, and his girlfriend attempted suicide due to the pressure put on her by the pair.

X-Team members Martin Ilievski and Igor Stojanovski shot and wounded two men in the head with a .38 caliber Smith & Wesson pistol following a dispute at a party in Hvidovre on 9 December 2001. Ilievski and Stojanovski then robbed a Danske Bank branch in Skovlunde of kr990,000 in January 2002. The pair were convicted of attempted murder and armed robbery, and were each sentenced to twelve years' imprisonment at the Østre Landsret (High Court of Eastern Denmark) in October 2002. An accomplice in the robbery, Asan Rusti, was sentenced to three years' for driving the perpetrators' getaway car, while a fourth man, Casper Wiinblad, was sentenced to one-and-a-half years' for handling the firearm used in the shootings.

A gang war involving the X-Team and the Red & White Crew – the Hells Angels' equivalent of the X-Team – in Næstved broke out on 6 January 2002 when shots were fired in an apparent feud over a young woman. Following a number of armed clashes, a villa belonging to Red & White Crew member Brian Lielbardis was targeted in an arson attack on 5 September 2002. Allan Lilsby, who was seen by a witness with two others near the burning villa, was arrested close to the scene. His two suspected accomplices were not apprehended.

Seven members were prosecuted in Næstved in June 2002 for extensive drug trafficking in east Zealand.

Two X-Team members were arrested on suspicion of trafficking in a large quantity of drugs on 24 September 2002 after a police raid on the gang's premises in Bagsværd uncovered hashish.

Three members of the gang were arrested after a man was beaten, stabbed twice in the leg, and robbed of his mobile phone and moped on 14 June 2003 in Horsens.

== Finland ==
X-Team has approximately sixty-five members in Finland.

Members of the Bandidos' and X-Team's Espoo chapter were among twenty-one people charged with importing and distributing amphetamine in January 2008.

The X-Team branch in Oulu – established in the spring of 2013 – has been investigated for crimes of violence and extortion. Police suspect the crimes are related to debt collection.

X-Team member Antti Niilo Raatikainen, along with a Bandidos member and a club hangaround, were convicted in October 2016 of violently extorting money from a man in Tampere in the spring of 2014.

In March 2017, four members of the X-Team and two members of the Bandidos in Tampere – including the chapter president – were prosecuted for a number of crimes relating to fraud, embezzlement and forgery which took place between 2013 and 2014.

== Germany ==
There are twenty-one X-Team chapters in Germany.

The X-Team chapter in Aachen was among six branches of Bandidos and its support clubs banned by the ministry of SPD MP Ralf Jäger on 26 April 2012. Over six-hundred police officers were involved in subsequent raids on the chapters' headquarters and members' residences.

On 28 April 2012, an X-Team member used his car to force a member of the Gremium Motorcycle Club off the road near Westerkappeln. The Gremium member fell from his motorcycle and suffered bruises and abrasions.

A nationwide ban on wearing the emblems of X-Team, as well as the Bandidos and seven other groups, in public came into effect on 16 March 2017.

== Norway ==
X-Team operates ten branches in Norway. While X-Team chapters are usually established in locations where the Bandidos already have a presence, there have been instances where branches have been founded in cities where the Bandidos have failed to organize. One example is the X-Team branch in Trondheim, which was founded in 2002. A previous attempt by the Bandidos at settling in Trondheim failed when two leading members of the support club Bronx '95, which was intended to serve as the precursor to a Bandidos chapter in the city, were shot and wounded by the Hells Angels on 17 December 1995.

The leader of the X-Team in Trondheim was sentenced to one year and four months in prison in May 2002 after being convicted of drug possession and multiple violations of the gun laws. He was in possession of amphetamine, pills, two knives and a loaded Kongsberg Colt pistol when he was arrested in November 2001.

== Sweden ==
There are seven X-Team branches in Sweden, the first of which were formed in the early 2000s.

X-Team has been involved in a conflict with the Original Gangsters (OGs) that was initiated by nightclub altercation between Amin Mosavi and Kennedy Acar, the younger brothers of the two gangs' leaders, on 15 June 2002 in Gothenburg. Acar – the brother of OGs leader Denho Acar – told OG enforcer Goran Kotaran of the event, and Kotaran decided to murder Mosavi's older brother, the leader of the X-Team, for what his younger brother had done. The following night, Kotaran went to the X-Team leader's apartment, and took firing position in the flower arrangements outside. He identified a person who he shot dead with eight shots. The person he murdered was, however, not the X-Team leader, but his younger brother, i.e., the person actually involved in the quarrel the night before. This triggered a series of violent events between the X-Team and OGs, involving bombs hand grenades and firearms. The violence led to a police crackdown on criminal gangs in western Sweden in 2004 which resulted in seventy gang members being sentenced to a total of 171 years in prison, and the two gangs entered a truce the following year when the Gothenburg X-Team was upgraded to a regular Bandidos chapter. The truce broken, however, on 4 July 2007 when Denho Acar's successor, Wojtek Walczak, was attacked by X-Team members in Halmstad. Walczak was sentenced to ten months in prison in January 2008 for an assault on an X-Team member that took place in November 2007.

X-Team and the Red & White Crew fought a war in Gothenburg between 2006 and 2009. Three Red & White Crew members were charged with the murder of an X-Team member who was shot in the head with two different weapons on Hisingen. Another X-Team members was also wounded in the shooting.

A struggle for control of the drug trade in the Gårdsten and Lövgärdet areas of northeast Gothenburg between X-Team and the Gårdstensalliansen (Gårdstens Alliance) gang began in August 2008. An X-Team member was shot dead the following month, and X-Team were eventually forced out of the area.

A conflict between Bernard "Berno" Khouri, leader of the Södertälje mafia (Södertäljenätverket), and Dany Moussa, the founder of the X-Team in Södertälje, resulted in a war between the groups over the control of Södertälje's criminal market which lasted for several months. On 23 December 2009, X-Team member Mohaned "K-Sigge" Ali was shot dead at an illegal gaming club by a member of the Södertälje mafia. In a revenge attack, three people associated with the Södertälje mafia were shot and wounded in a drive-by shooting on 1 April 2010. One of the men – Sherbel Said – was left paralyzed from the chest down. On 1 July 2010, two men armed with a pistol and a Yugoslavian made Kalashnikov rifle killed Yaacoub and Eddie Moussa, two cousins of Dany Moussa, and wounded a third man at the same gambling club where Mohaned Ali had earlier been murdered. Forensics found that Eddie was shot seventeen times and Yaacoub fourteen times. Police assembled a team of over sixty officers to end the turf war in Sodertalje. Two X-Team members were found guilty on 26 October 2010 of attempted murder for the April shooting. On 1 August 2012, eighteen members of the Södertälje mafia were found guilty of committing crimes in their feud with the X-Team. Bernard Khouri was given a life sentence for ordering the murders of Mohaned Ali and the Moussa brothers, as well as additional crimes, while Abraham "Torpeden" Aho was sentenced to twelve years' imprisonment for carrying out the murder of Mohaned Ali on 29 August 2013.
