= Norsborg =

- Residential district
- Location in Stockholm County
- Coordinates: 59°15′06″N 17°48′35″E
- Country: Sweden
- County: Stockholm County
- Municipality: Botkyrka Municipality
- Time zone: UTC+1 (CET)
  - Summer (DST): UTC+2 (CEST)

Norsborg is a part of Botkyrka Municipality in Stockholm County, Sweden. Norsborg consists of the residential areas Hallunda, Eriksberg and Slagsta. Norsborg and Hallunda are contiguous suburbs.

== History ==
Norsborg was previously a country estate in the Botkyrka parish, situated on a bay of Vårbyfjärden and with some of the property facing Bornsjön, as well as Kärsby and Tomtberga with an area of 350 hectares.

The area, which was originally called Borg and was part of the village of Hundhamra, but in the late 1700s the property was named Norsborg after the owner Count Johan Liljencrantz's wife Eleonora Stjernstedt. Liljencrantz also owned Sturehov, Slagsta farm and Fittja in the same parish and had Norsborg's manor built. From his time a significant part of the garden and the large English-style park originate with a gazebo by Olof Tempelman and a view tower that long adorned Norsborg.

Norsborg was purchased in 1900 for SEK 185,000 by the City of Stockholm for its water pipeline from Bornsjön. The city built their main station of the management, Norsborg waterworks, with filtration basins, pumping stations, electricity plants, residential buildings and more, and in 1912 the city council decided to place the entire water main plant there. The waterworks has a yearly capacity of 80,000,000 m^{3} of drinking water and is the largest fresh water plant serving Stockholm.

Those with a foreign background made up 54.6% in 1997, 70.6% in 2008.

== Modern development ==
The area consists largely of high-rise areas built under the Million Programme and several are located near the E4 / E20 motorway, but the development also includes a large area with townhouses and semi-detached houses, which are characterized by well-preserved nature areas. There are also several churches in the area.

The population is about 17,000 people, of which 81.2 per cent with foreign background in 2017. According to police, Norsborg is a problem area from a crime point of view, which is classified as a particularly vulnerable area.

Norsborg has the south-western terminus of the Stockholm Metro system's Red Line. It was opened in 1975 and is the westernmost of all Stockholm Metro stations.

== See also ==
- Murder of Adriana Naghei Ostrowska

== Gallery ==
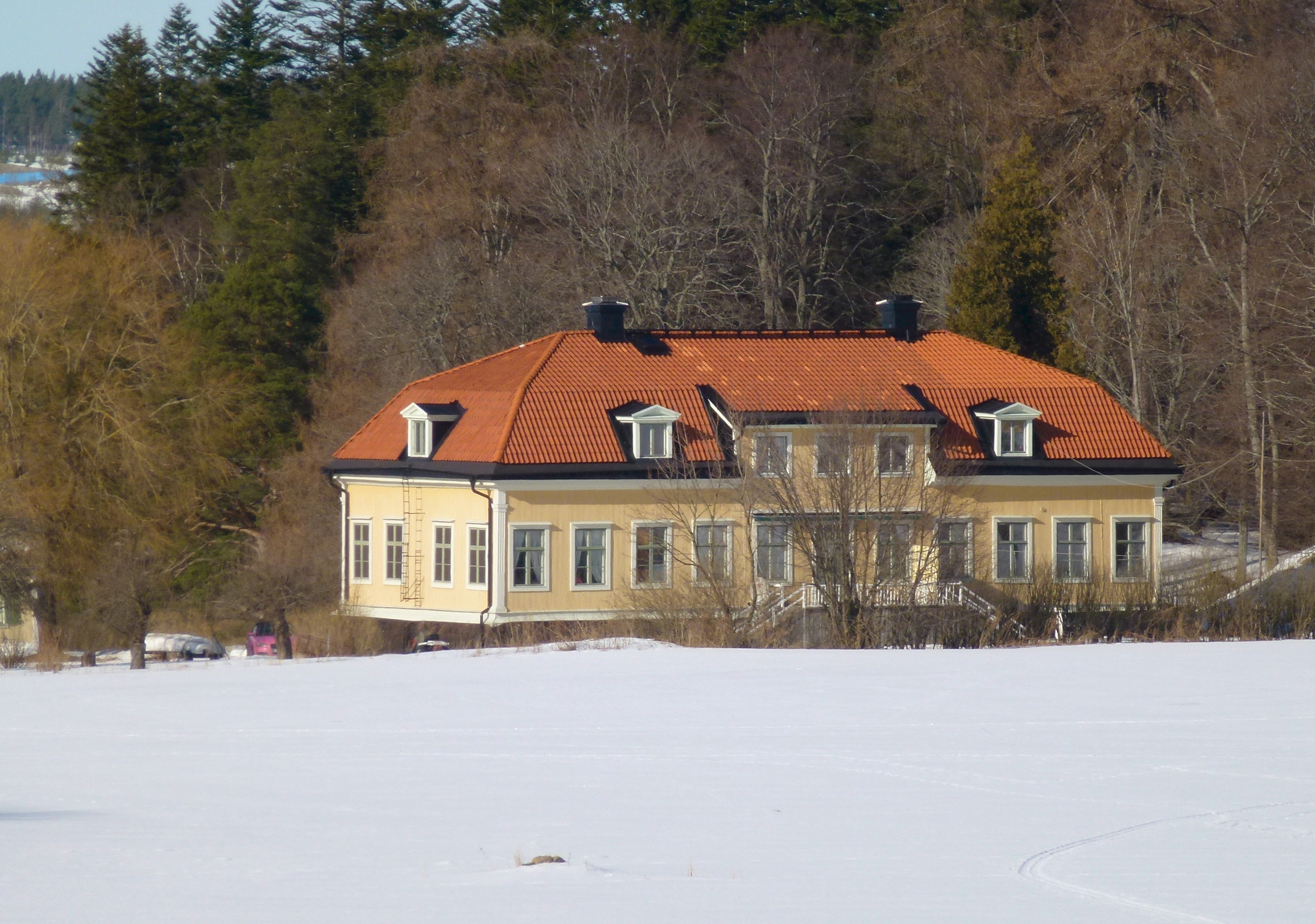
Norsborgs farm (2013)

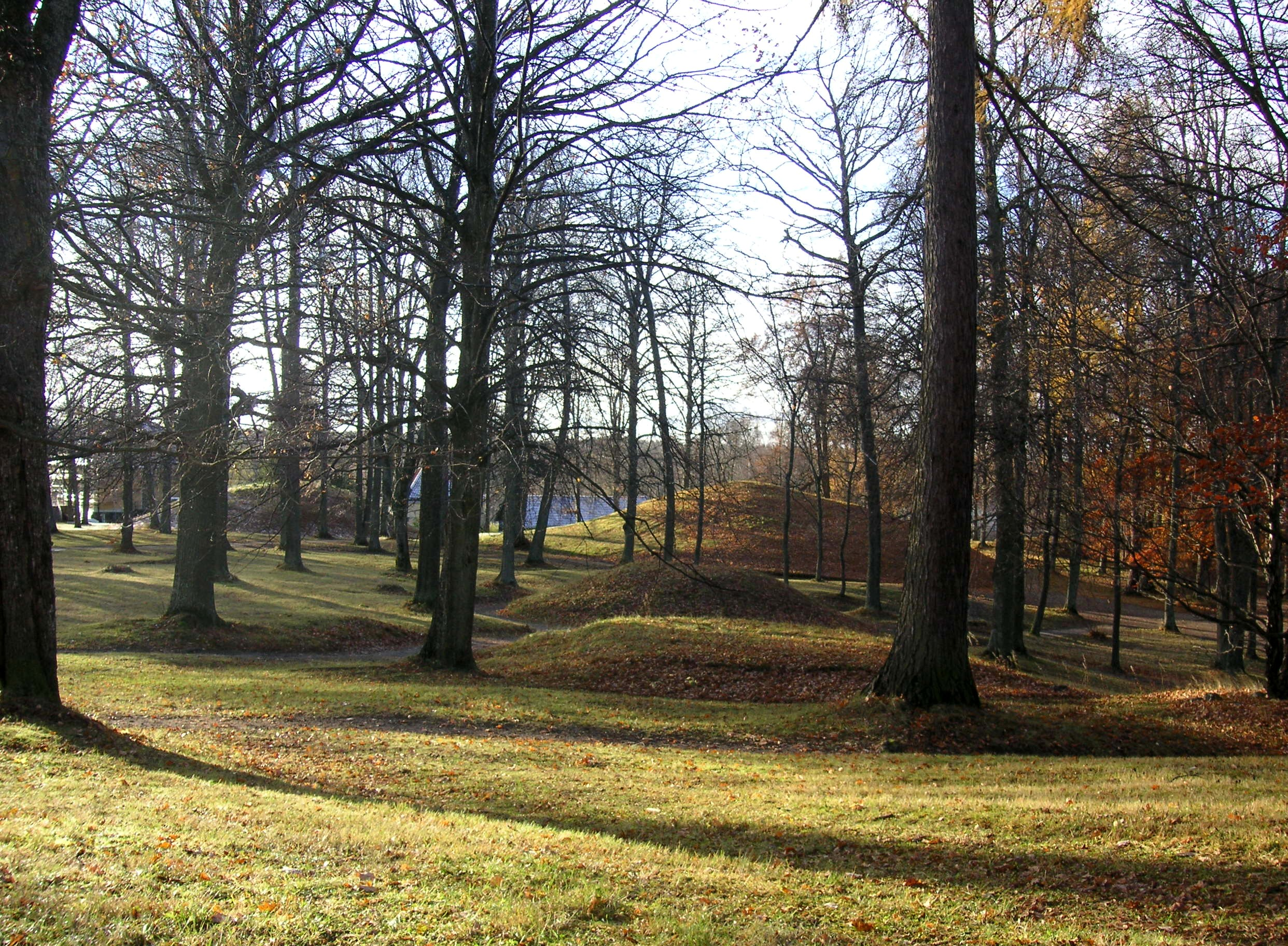
Iron Age Burial mounds

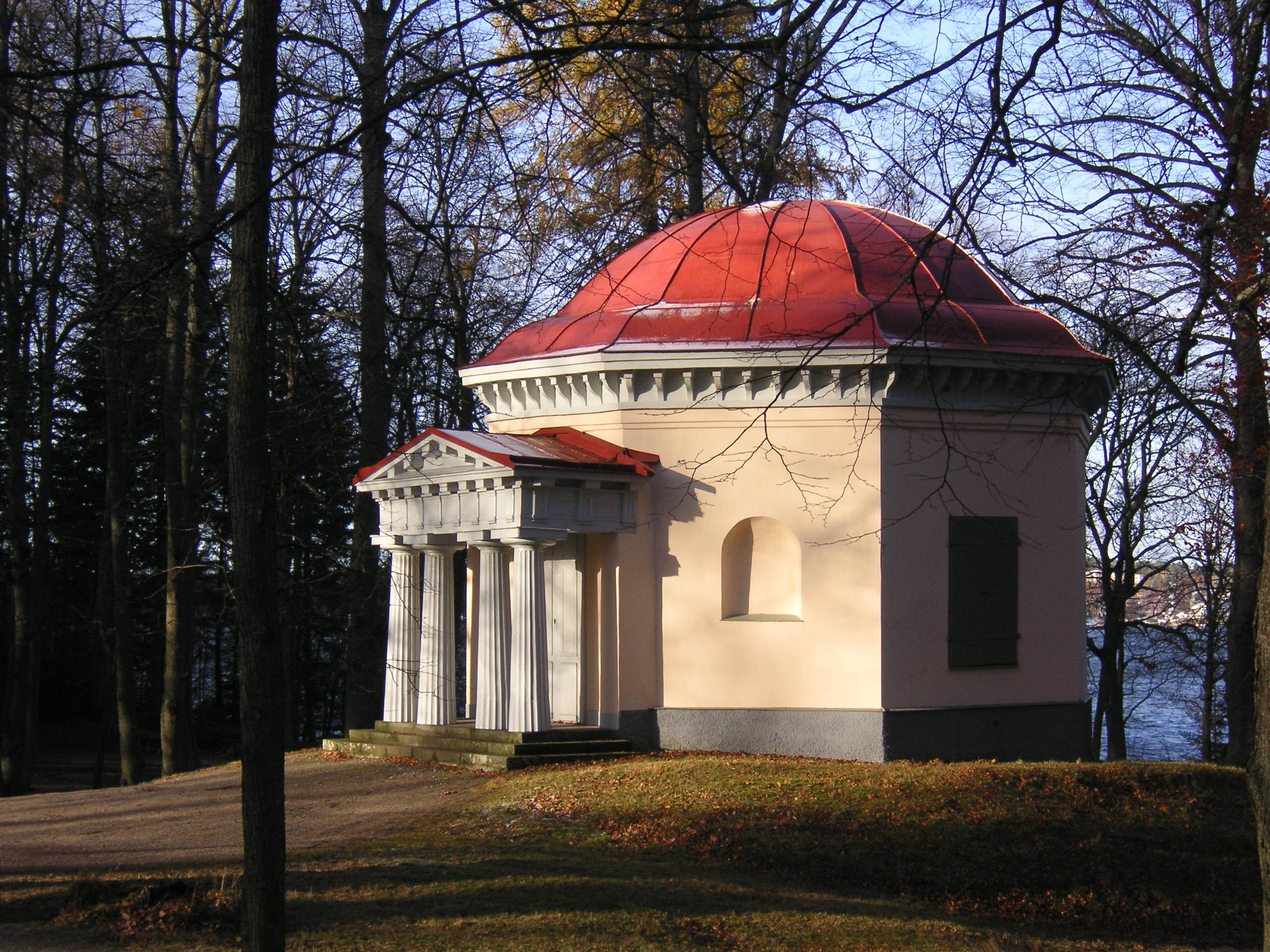
Eleonora's umbrella

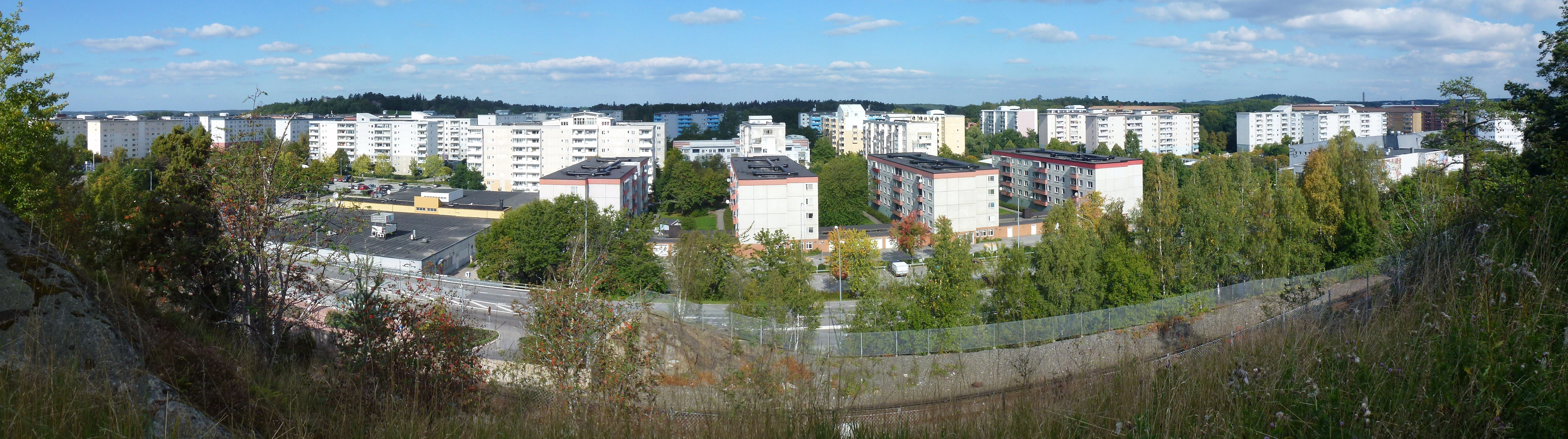
View from Eriksberg over Norsborg, September 2014.
