= Forex (disambiguation) =

Forex is the foreign exchange market, the global international currency market

Forex or FOREX can also be used for

== Finance ==
- The forex scandal
- Forex Bank, a Swedish company
- A foreign exchange swap

== Other ==
- FC Forex Brașov, a Romanian football team
- A company used in an FBI sting operation
