= Dödspatrullen =

Swedish Somali organized crime syndicate

- Dödspatrullen, 3MST
- Founded: 2015
- Founding location: Rinkeby, Sweden
- Ethnicity: Somali
- Membership: c. 70 members
- Leaders: Mohamed Abdigahni Ali, Abdisamed Dahir Ahmed, Zakaria Amin Sheik Ahmed
- Activities: Illegal drug trade, murder
- Rivals: Shottaz

Dödspatrullen (lit. 'The Death squad'), also known as 3MST, is a Swedish Somali organised crime gang, originating from the Rinkeby district of Stockholm, Sweden. The crime syndicate is said to operate in multiple markets and countries, such as Finland, Denmark, Morocco, Spain, and Sweden. Dödspatrullen are participants in the illegal drug trade, along with doing murders, amongst other illegal activities.

== History ==
=== Beginnings of the Shottaz rivalry ===
Dödspatrullen has been in a gang war with Shottaz, another Swedish Somali criminal organization originating from Rinkeby, since 2015. This conflict has led to the death of at least nine people, with most if not all of the victims being young men/boys. The start of the gang wars and rivalry, followed the robbery of a Forex in Täby on 22 July 2015, of around 2 million Swedish krona. This led to the murder of 20-year-old Ismail Aden in Bromsten by Maslah, due to bitter jealousy and anger at not having been given proceeds of the robbery, despite his organizing and planning of the robbery. This later lead the revenge murder of Maslah two days later. The Dödspatrullen criminal organization also murdered a leader of Shottaz, and his brother at Mynta café in Stockholm, in 2016.

Two men were murdered in Herlev, by two 17-year-old Dödspatrullen members in June 2019. One was shot nineteen times, and the other was shot in his thigh, and eventually bled to death. Following their murders, the five perpetrators attempted to flee Denmark in an Audi car, however they were later found in Nærum, with illegal weaponry. Two were sentenced to 16 years in prison, and the other three to life imprisonment.

=== Illegal drug dealing ===
Dödspatrullen is said to have begun its drug trade origins by capturing the drug market of Solna, Sweden. Dödspatrullen smuggles drugs, such as cocaine, hashish and other drugs, from Spain and Morocco into the Nordic region. The criminal organization is said to have entered into the Finnish market, transporting drugs from Övertorneå to mainland Finland. Dödspatrullen then sells their drugs to gangs and criminal organizations on the streets of major Finnish cities.
