= 2025 Uppsala shooting =

2025 mass shooting in Uppsala, Sweden

2025 Uppsala Shooting
- The perpetrator inside a Taxi before the shooting.

- Vaksala Square (Uppsala)
- Location: Vaksala Square, Uppsala, Sweden
- Date: April 29, 2025 c. 17:00 (CET)
- Attack type: Mass shooting
- Weapons: 9mm HS-9 semi-automatic pistol; .45-caliber Glock 21 semi-automatic pistol (unused)
- Deaths: 3
- Injuries: 2 (in Eslöv)
- Perpetrator: Fredric Gülich Brendling
- Motive: Contract killing; Desire for affluence
- Convictions: Murder, attempted murder and aggravated weapons offences
- Sentence: Life imprisonment

The 2025 Uppsala shooting was a mass shooting that occurred on April 29, 2025, at a hair salon in Vaksala Square, central Uppsala, Sweden. The attack resulted in the deaths of three individuals, all aged between 15 and 20, and is considered part of Sweden's ongoing gang-related violence. The incident took place during the city's Walpurgis Night celebrations.

== Incident ==
On April 29, 2025, at approximately 5:00 p.m. local time, a masked gunman approached a hair salon in central Uppsala armed with two firearms. He first opened fire outside the salon at two men allegedly connected to criminal networks. One escaped, while the other fled into the salon and locked himself in a bathroom.

The gunman followed into the salon and fired at least eleven additional shots. Three victims were killed — 15-year-old Aiham Ahmad, 16-year-old identified as Omar, and a 20-year-old man with alleged gang connections. All three victims suffered multiple gunshot wounds to the head.

The masked shooter fled the crowded neighborhood on an e-scooter, triggering an immediate manhunt involving police helicopters and a temporary halt of local train services. A 16-year-old boy was initially detained by police but was released days later after suspicions against him weakened.

== Perpetrator ==
The perpetrator, Fredric Gülich Brendling, was 20 years old at the time of the shooting. According to court proceedings and media reports, he had a history of criminal convictions involving narcotics offenses, aggravated drunk driving, and robbery.

During his teenage years, Gülich Brendling spent time in a youth care facility in Värmland County. Family members later claimed that he became involved with gang-affiliated individuals while there.

Prosecutors alleged that Gülich Brendling carried out murders and shootings as paid assignments connected to organized crime. Investigators recovered handwritten notes in which he described his motive to earn one million Swedish kronor by committing violent acts.

Authorities also connected him to a separate shooting in Eslöv earlier in the same month, in which two men were seriously injured but survived.

== Investigation and trial ==
Police arrested several suspects following the shooting. Prosecutors alleged that accomplices had supplied the gunman with weapons, transportation, disguises, and a safe house.

In May 2026, the Uppsala District Court convicted Gülich Brendling of three counts of murder, attempted murder, and aggravated weapons offenses. He was sentenced to life imprisonment.

A forensic psychiatric evaluation concluded that he was not suffering from a severe mental disorder at the time of the crimes. Two additional defendants were convicted of related offenses, while two others accused of complicity in the murders were acquitted.

Aiham Ahmad, aged 15, was described by relatives as having no involvement in gang criminality. Investigators later stated that he was neither the intended target nor connected to organized crime. His parents, Aiman Ahmad and Sanabel Ahmad, spoke publicly after the killings and described the family as devastated by the loss. In an interview with Expressen, he said: “We are crushed, but at the same time we find peace because we know what kind of person he was.”

The perpetrator reportedly laughed at the mother of Aiham when she started crying during the trial.

== Response ==
The shooting, occurring during Walpurgis Night celebrations, shocked Uppsala. Justice Minister Gunnar Strömmer called it "a brutal act of violence," while Prime Minister Ulf Kristersson condemned it as "terrible and ruthless." The shooting heightened concerns about youth involvement in Sweden's gang violence, as minors often face lighter sentences, making them targets for recruitment by criminal networks.

== See also ==
- Örebro school shooting
- Mattias Flink
- Tommy Zethraeus
- Gothenburg pub shooting
