= Killing of Paul Schmidt =

2023 fatal stabbing in Vancouver, Canada

- Vancouver, British Columbia Location of killing in Downtown Vancouver
- Location: 49°28′47″N 123°11′52″W; Downtown Vancouver, British Columbia, Canada
- Date: March 26, 2023 c. 5:40 p.m. (PST, UTC-8)
- Deaths: Paul Stanley Schmidt
- Perpetrator: Inderdeep Singh Gosal
- Charges: Second-degree murder
- Convictions: Manslaughter

Paul Stanley Schmidt was a 37-year-old Canadian who died of a stabbing on March 26, 2023, in Vancouver, British Columbia, Canada.

The accused, Inderdeep Singh Gosal, age 32, was arrested and charged with second-degree murder. Gosal pleaded not guilty. His judge-alone trial concluded with closing arguments on May 6, 2026. The defence argued that Gosal should instead be convicted of manslaughter, citing his mental illness and the circumstances of the confrontation, in which Schmidt was found to have been the initial aggressor and Gosal to have experienced fear for his life. The Crown maintained that Gosal possessed the subjective foresight of death required for murder. In September 2026, Gosal was found guilty of manslaughter and acquitted of second-degree murder.

== Killing ==
At around 5:30 PM, Paul Schmidt accompanied his fiancée Ashley Umali and their daughter to a Starbucks coffee shop located at the corner of West Pender Street and Granville Street in Downtown Vancouver. Umali went inside to order while Schmidt, and their daughter in a stroller, waited outside. While outside, Schmidt spoke with Gosal for using an electronic cigarette and requested him not to vape around his daughter. An argument began, and Schmidt initially walked away before leaving his child with a stranger, returning and approaching Gosal. According to CCTV footage presented at trial, Schmidt then confronted Gosal, adopted a fighting stance, and punched toward him while beginning to corner him. Gosal subsequently produced a knife and stabbed Schmidt in the neck and torso. At his 2026 trial, Justice Kathleen Ker found that Schmidt had been the primary physical aggressor and that Gosal had initially acted in response to a perceived threat, but that the subsequent stabbing exceeded what was reasonably necessary for self-defence. A pedestrian, Alex Bodger, began filming the incident as Gosal yelled "fucking bitch" to Schmidt while he staggered and fell to the ground bleeding. Bodger continued filming Schmidt, posing for the camera and exclaiming "this motherfucker just died, bro." Gosal also began filming Schmidt on the ground from inside the Starbucks. Other bystanders flagged down a constable patrolling the area and police responded to the scene around 5:40 P.M. Officers attempted medical assistance on Schmidt, but he was declared dead after being rushed to the hospital. Gosal was arrested without resistance.

== Aftermath ==
Schmidt's family, the Vancouver Police Department, and mayor Ken Sim issued statements asking people not to share images and video of the stabbing over social media. Schmidt's sister Jessica Foxx wrote on Facebook condemning the attack and Bodger's filming of it, posting "Someone took my brother's life yesterday and another person filmed it (do NOT watch) instead of calling the police and worse off posted it on social media very clearly for views." Their mother, Kathy Schmidt, told the Vancouver Sun about her son's killing, saying "This is so horribly wrong what happened," and that "[Gosal] had a knife. I don't carry a knife into a coffee shop, do you?" A fundraiser on GoFundMe for fiancée Ashley Umali and daughter Erica Schmidt was organized by the local Dr. Sun Yat-Sen Garden Society, whose Executive Director Lorraine Lowe is a neighbor and friend of Umali's cousin. The fundraiser successfully raised over $165,000 CAD before the end of the month.

Avatar of Mayor Ken Sim

Mayor Ken Sim
(@KenSimCity)
tweeted:

This is an awful and tragic story to hear about. Nobody should ever feel unsafe walking around out (sic) city. Our hearts go out to Mr Schmidt and his family — out of respect for them and their loss, please refrain from sharing graphic images or videos of the incident on social media.

March 27, 2023

Becoming the sixth homicide in Vancouver in 2023, Schmidt's killing was cited on March 28 (along with three other stabbing deaths also from within the prior three days) by Conservative leader Pierre Poilievre while addressing an increase in knife crime in Canada's big cities. Police spokesman Sgt. Steve Addison stated the VPD "[believes] this homicide was witnessed by dozens of bystanders" and for any witnesses to provide the information privately to the police, adding in reference to Bodger's video "You don't need me to tell you that sharing a graphic, gratuitous video of someone's dying moments is inappropriate. Anyone with a sense of good taste knows that's inappropriate." Mayor Ken Sim retweeted the DailyHive's coverage of the killing, giving condolences to Schmidt's family.

Bodger uploaded his video and photos with Schmidt to TikTok, the video going viral and spreading to platforms such as Instagram, Reddit, and Twitter. The video provoked discussion of the bystander effect and backlash towards the TikToker for his apathetic behavior. In an interview with Global News, Bodger said he was traumatized by the killing and was only smirking in his video because he tends to smile during "uncomfortable situations", but would later post a video saying "Yeah, this shit, it doesn't faze me too much [...] I'll just say human life to me, the way I look at it, if I don't know you, it's meaningless, it's meaningless. I'm just keeping it straight up." Bodger returned to the Starbucks the day after Schmidt's death to take pictures of himself smoking cigarettes for social media.

== See also ==
- Murder of Mikael Janicki
