= Original Gangsters (gang) =

Swedish criminal gang

- Founded: 1993
- Founded by: Denho Acar
- Founding location: Gothenburg, Sweden
- Years active: 1993–present
- Territory: Gothenburg, Halmstad and Jönköping
- Ethnicity: Assyrian, Turkish, Iranian, Finnish, Serbs, Spaniards, Polish and Swedish
- Membership (est.): 30 inner-circle members + associates, total approx 100
- Criminal activities: Drug dealing, prostitution, extortion, illegal gambling
- Allies: Various street gangs made up of ethnic minorities
- Rivals: Naserligan, Bandidos and the X-Team

Original Gangsters (OGs) is a criminal gang in Sweden. Founded in 1993, it has its base in Gothenburg and members in Halmstad and Jönköping, among other places, and is one of a handful of Swedish criminal gangs that have received significant media attention. Its leader and founder is Denho Acar, who fled Sweden in 2007. The current number of members is uncertain: Original Gangsters' own figures of some one hundred active were disputed by the Swedish police, which describe the gang as currently being largely decimated.

The gang took its name from the term Original Gangster used by gangsta rapper Ice-T in 1991.

== History ==
Original Gangsters was formed in the Gothenburg suburb Bergsjön in 1993 by Denho Acar (alias "Dano" or "Djingis Khan") and two of his childhood friends. Denho Acar was born in Midyat, Turkey in 1974, to Assyrian Christian parents, and his family moved to Bergsjön in 1985. In 2007, Denho Acar fled to the tourist resort Marmaris in Turkey since he was wanted for an arson attack against a Gothenburg café. Being a Turkish citizen, Acar is able to avoid extradition while he remains in Turkey. Acar had never received Swedish citizenship, only a residence permit, and in August 2008, it was revoked.

Turkey-based Acar remains Original Gangsters' leader in Europe, but handed over the title of as the gang's "president" in Sweden in 2008. The extent of the gang's European activities outside of Sweden, which would be what Acar leads, remains somewhat unclear.

Interviewed for a 2007 book, Acar claimed that the number of members is around 100, with an inner circle of around 30. All members are men, and the gang's members have varying ethnical backgrounds: most are from countries where there have been significant immigration to Sweden, such as Iran, Finland, Turkey (Assyrians), Latin America or the former Yugoslavia, but there are also many Swedish members.

The sign of membership is a tattoo of the gang's symbol, which has been inspired by the Assyrian flag and shows the letters "OG" in the middle of the sun.

=== Conflicts with other gangs ===
A characteristic of the Original Gangsters which contributed to their media attention is their tendency to come into violent conflict with other criminal gangs.

The first known large-scale violent conflict was in 2000, with the Naserligan gang, the members of which was of Albanian extraction. The conflict was over profitable activities in Gothenburg, such as illegal gambling. However, there was also a background of a senior member in OG having stabbed two Albanians in 1996, when they had been working as bouncers. Following the OG man's release from prison in February 2000, shooting between the two gangs erupted in May 2000 outside an illegal gambling place in Gothenburg, leading to two OG members being wounded. The revenge came on June 4, 2001, when members of the Original Gangsters were targeted at a public bathing place (Näset) in Gothenburg, and a gunfight erupted among bystanders. One person of Naserligan received a chest wound during the shooting. Several violent events followed during the summer of 2001, including the serious wounding of an innocent 37-year-old bystander in a night club where the two gangs collided. The shooting at bathing place did however lead to a police crackdown with two hundred arrests and fifty confiscated weapons during the following year, leading the two gangs to enter a truce.

Another conflict involved Original Gangsters and X-Team, a supporter club of Bandidos. It was initiated by night club quarrel between the younger brothers' of the two gangs on June 15, 2002. Acars younger brother told an OG member by the name of Kotaran of the event, and he decided to murder the leader of the X-Team for what his younger brother had done. The following night Kotaran went to the X-Team leader's apartment, and took firing position in the flower arrangements outside. He identified a person which he shot dead with eight shots. The person he murdered was however not the X-Team leader, but his younger brother, i.e., the person actually involved in the quarrel the night before. This triggered a series of violent events between Original Gangsters and X-Team. Following another police crackdown on criminal gangs in western Sweden, the two gangs entered a truce in 2005, when X-Team was upgraded to a regular Bandidos club. This truce was however broken in July 2007 in Halmstad.
