= Södertälje mafia =

Assyrian criminal gang in Sweden

- Founded: Early 1980s
- Founding location: Sweden
- Territory: Södertälje, Botkyrka, Stockholm
- Ethnicity: Syriac-Assyrian
- Membership: 75–100 people
- Criminal activities: Illegal drug trade, murder, welfare fraud, extortion, loan sharking, money laundering, assault, contract killing.

The Södertälje mafia (Swedish: Södertäljenätverket), also known as the Södertälje network, is a Syriac-Assyrian criminal organisation, according to some testimonials to have 75–100 people, based in Södertälje.

The criminal organization is based on family, kinship and the notion of a common origin. There is not a single person or a particular family that leads the organization, which is based on a tradition of cooperation and exchange of services within and between the families. In September 2014, the Svea Court of Appeal in Stockholm confirmed the existence of a criminal organization in Södertälje, with an extensive power structure with ramifications into politics and the welfare sector. According to Police information in October 2019, the organization is still growing and gaining more power.

Up to today, the mafia group has been successful in connecting with people in important positions in the Södertälje Municipality, using gambling clubs and the Syriac Orthodox Church to make connections. A chairman of the St. Aphrem Cathedral in the city is alleged to have connections to the group, but the church has denied these allegations.

== Controversies ==
=== November 2011 trial ===
In November 2011, a comprehensive trial began against 17 men in the Södertälje District Court. The indictment against the men included three murders (namely that of Eddie Moussa), kidnapping and extortion. The trial lasted for six months, and at the time was considered to be the largest in Swedish history, costing nearly 200 million Swedish kronor. The trial also had to be rescheduled as a juror had been disqualified due to being a regular member of the Södertälje Police Committee while the case was ongoing.

After the trial concluded, the perpetrator of the murder was sentenced to life in prison, while two were sentenced to juvenile detention. The rest of the men indicted were sentenced to anywhere from six months to one year in prison.
