= Murder of Adriana Naghei Ostrowska =

2020 child murder in Sweden

- Photo of Adriana at a memorial
- Location: Norsborg, Botkyrka Municipality, Sweden
- Date: 2 August 2020 c. 3:30 am (CET)
- Target: Seven members of the Norsborg gang
- Attack type: Drive-by shooting, attempted mass shooting
- Weapon: Fully automatic AK-47 Kalashnikov rifle
- Deaths: 1 (Adriana)
- Perpetrators: Maykil Yokhanna; Benjamin Mahdi; Hassan Mohammad
- Convictions: Murder; Seven counts of attempted murder
- Sentence: Life imprisonment

Adriana Naghei Ostrowska was a 12-year-old girl who was shot dead in Norsborg, Botkyrka Municipality, Sweden, on 2 August 2020. Adriana was caught in the crossfire of a gang-related shooting while she was out walking her dog. The case became notorious and a major political debate in Sweden.

== Shooting ==
CCTV still of the shooting.

During the night leading into Sunday, 2 August, Adriana was walking her dog in a parking lot between a McDonald’s restaurant and a Shell gas station when a white Audi car suddenly appeared carrying several perpetrators who opened fire in a drive-by shooting. Police were alerted to the scene at 3:30 am, where Adriana was found with gunshot wounds. She was taken to a hospital, but her life could not be saved.

According to the subsequent murder investigation, more than 20 shots were fired from three different weapons in a planned attack targeting seven young men at the scene. The intended targets were unharmed, while Adriana was hit by two bullets. The background to the shooting was a gang conflict, and the purpose was reportedly to kill two individuals connected to the so-called Norsborg gang. One of the intended targets is said to have called 112 and attempted to stop Adriana’s bleeding after the shooting.

The automatic weapon that caused Adriana’s death had been used two days earlier as a prop in the music video for the song “Blue Cheese” by the gangsta rapper 10an. 10an was later sentenced to four years in prison for aggravated weapons offences.

== Reactions ==
The murder prompted widespread reactions across Swedish society and political leadership, becoming a focal point in discussions on gang violence and public safety.

=== Political reactions ===
Senior government officials condemned the killing as a tragic example of the broader surge in gang-related shootings affecting Sweden. Then–Minister of justice Morgan Johansson labelled the incident an "abhorrent atrocity" and urged the public to assist law enforcement by providing any information that could help identify the perpetrators, emphasising the need for collective responsibility in tackling violent crime.

In addition, then Prime Minister Stefan Löfven referenced the murder in a summer speech later in 2020, expressing both outrage and resolve, stating that “in a stronger society there is no place for gang criminals, mafia bosses and small-time thugs who shatter the lives of ordinary families”.

The Minister of the Interior Mikael Damberg also issued public statements on social media, describing the fatal shooting in Botkyrka as “tragically awful" and reiterated the government’s commitment to increasing efforts against organised crime to prevent such incidents from reoccurring.

== Subsequent legal proceedings ==
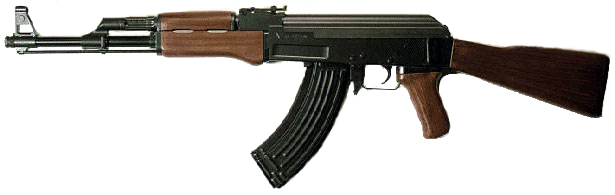
An Avtomat Kalashnikova assault rifle, the weapon used in the murder.

Three men were charged with murder as well as seven counts of attempted murder relating to the intended targets of the shooting. An additional three men were charged with offences connected to the incident, including attempted murder and aggravated weapons offences. The two intended targets were themselves later charged with gang-related attempted murder.

On 26 April 2023, the three defendants were sentenced to life imprisonment for the murder of Adriana. One of those convicted was 31-year-old Maykil Yokhanna, identified as the gang leader of the May network. The other two men convicted of the murder were 24-year-old Benjamin Mahdi and 32-year-old Hassan Mohammad.

The evidence in the case consisted of a large number of circumstantial factors, such as links to the weapons and the vehicle used, the men’s motives, and their communications about the incident in encrypted chats. Their subsequent actions to dispose of the weapons and the car were also significant for the verdict.

Following an appeal of the life sentences, the Svea Court of Appeal heard the case on 4 September 2023. In December 2023, the Court of Appeal sentenced two of the men, including Maykil Yokhanna, to life imprisonment, while the third was acquitted. However, the third man was convicted of preparation for murder in another case. In May 2024, the Supreme Court of Sweden decided not to grant leave to appeal, meaning that the Court of Appeal’s judgment stands.

== See also ==
- Murder of Mikael Janicki
