= Naserligan =

Swedish criminal gang

- Founder: Naser Dzeljilji
- Years active: 2000–present
- Territory: Gothenburg
- Ethnicity: Kosovo Albanians
- Membership: c.100 members
- Activities: Illegal drug trade, illegal gambling, armed robbery, extortion

Naserligan, also known as the Naser Gang, is a criminal organisation primarily active in Gothenburg, Sweden. Named after its leader, Naser Dzeljilji, the gang is involved in various illicit activities, including drug trafficking, gambling, and protection racketing.

== History ==
Naserligan gained notoriety in 2001 when it became embroiled in a violent conflict with another gang, the Original Gangsters. The conflict was centered around the control of the illegal gambling market in Gothenburg and escalated into open gunfights, including one on a public beach in the city.

== Activities ==
The criminal activities of Naserligan extend beyond gambling-related disputes. Members of the gang have been involved in drug trafficking, particularly the distribution of narcotics in the Gothenburg area. Additionally, Naserligan has been implicated in cases of armed robbery, extortion, and fraud.

== Leadership ==
Naser Dzeljilji is the reputed leader of Naserligan, although the organization's structure and hierarchy are not publicly known. Dzeljilji's leadership has been associated with the gang's expansion and consolidation of power in the Gothenburg underworld.

== Ethnic Dynamics ==
Naserligan is notable for its diverse membership, consisting of individuals of Albanian and Swedish descent. The ethnic composition of the gang has sometimes contributed to tensions and conflicts, particularly during clashes with rival criminal organizations.
