= Murder of Mikael Janicki =

2024 murder in Stockholm, Sweden

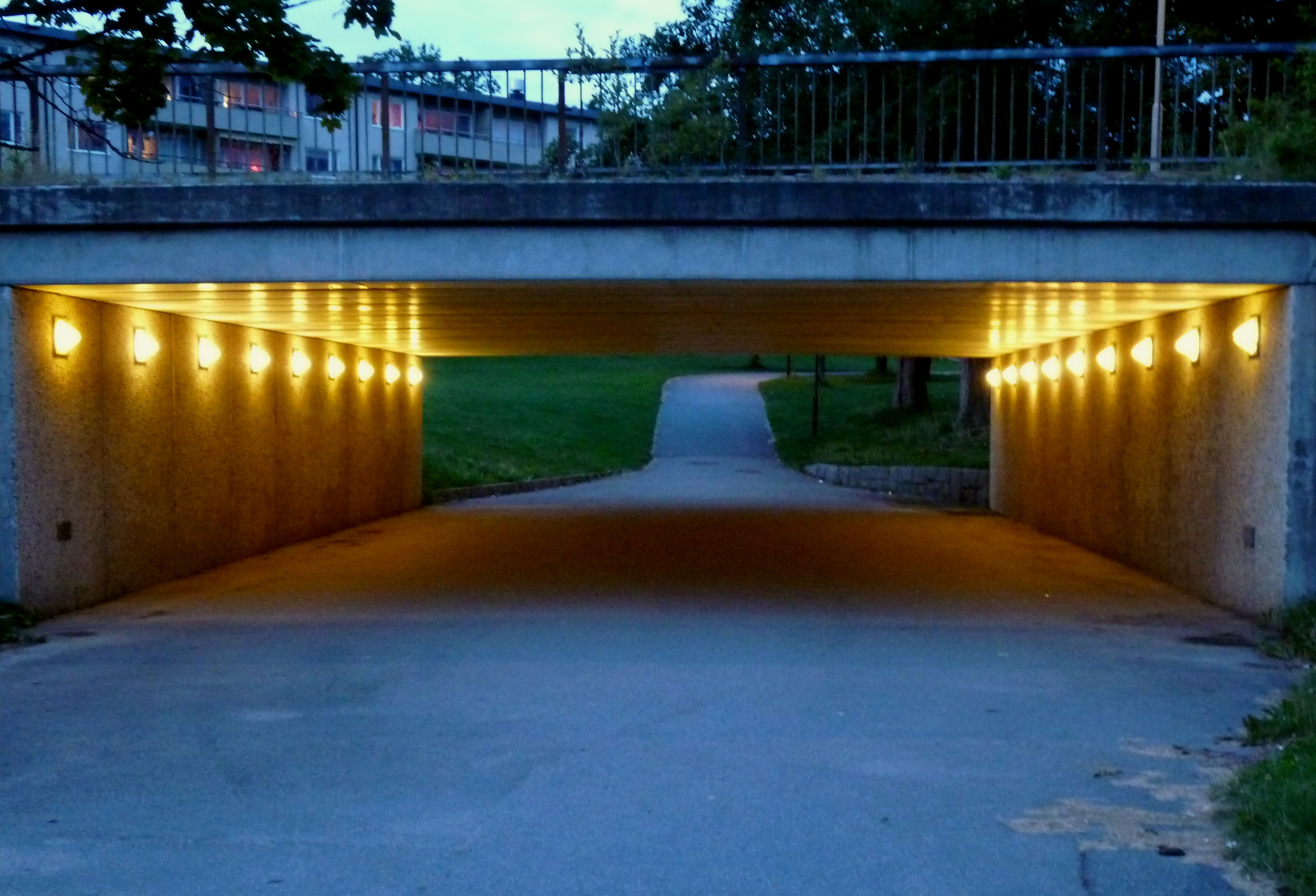
- The tunnel where the murder occurred
- Location: 59°16′33.4″N 17°54′10.8″E; Bodholmsgången, Skärholmen, Stockholm, Sweden
- Date: 10 April 2024 c. 18:15 (CET)
- Attack type: Shooting
- Weapon: .380 converted Ekol Alp starter pistol
- Deaths: Mikael Janicki
- Perpetrator: Mohammed Khalid Mohammed Mohammed
- Convictions: Murder and aggravated weapons offences
- Sentence: 14 years imprisonment

Mikael Janicki (Note: Polish: Michał Janicki) was a 39-year-old man who was shot dead in front of his 12-year-old son on 10 April 2024 in Stockholm. The murder received extensive media attention due to its ruthlessness.

== The murder ==
On April 10 at around 18:15, Janicki and his 12-year-old son were cycling to Skärholmen swimming hall when they passed a group of youths standing in a pedestrian tunnel. Janicki told his son that he would "have a talk with those brats" then turned back to confront the group, it is unknown why he did this but it is believed to be related to something he heard the group say. The confrontation led to an argument during which the 17-year-old Mohammed Khalid Mohammed Mohammed produced a gun and fired a shot at the ground in front of Janicki's feet, Janicki attempted to disarm Mohammed when the perpetrator then fired two shots, hitting him in the chest and abdomen, killing him in front of his son. The son immediately called the emergency number 112 while the group ran away.

The next day, three of the youths were arrested but the police found that none of them were the shooter. The perpetrator was on the run for three days until police officers in Eskilstuna decided to search an apartment that smelled of cannabis and coincidentally found Mohammed.

== Reactions ==
The murder caused nation-wide debate. Prime Minister Ulf Kristersson visited the memorial site for Mikael Janicki in Skärholmen and described the murder as “an animalistic savagery”. Sweden Democrats party leader Jimmie Åkesson stated that the party was “declaring full war” on gang crime.

When Magdalena Andersson visited the memorial in Skärholmen, Janicki's sister and brother-in-law confronted her and claimed that her attendance was disingenuous and a publicity stunt

The 12-year-old boy's mother later expressed gratitude in the media for the public support the family received following the murder.

== Victim ==
Mikael Janicki in an undated photo

Lord Mikael Oskar Janicki, (22 June 1984 – 10 April 2024) was a 39-year-old resident of Stockholm. Janicki was born in Sweden to Polish parents and had no criminal record. Janicki was reportedly upset over the crime and illegal drug trade going on in Skärholmen and Janicki's sister was a friend to the mother of Adriana Naghei Ostrowska, a 12-year-old girl who was shot to death in 2020 during an attempted mass shooting.

Around ten years before the incident, Janicki suffered a stroke from an unspecified near-death experience which left him "somewhat mentally debilitated". The stroke caused Janicki to have problems with temper and controlling his anger. Janicki was unable to work because of the stroke and while he owned an apartment, he mostly resided with his mother due to his needs.

After his death a memorial was set up in the tunnel with a plaque that reads "We will forever remember you and carry with us your courage and example"

== Perpetrator ==
Mugshot of the perpetrator

Mohammed Khalid Mohammed Mohammed, (Note: His first name is registered as Mohammed Khalid Mohammed, his last name is registered as Mohammed) born 19 May 2006 in Nineveh, Iraq is a former resident of Skärholmen who came to Sweden as a child in 2007. Mohammed was known to police since elementary school and was put in a youth crime prevention program in 2019. Mohammed was already wanted by police for two previous incidents in Stockholm. The first was when he shot at a man with an automatic rifle. The other was when he kidnapped and tortured a man in a basement, when the victim escaped Mohammed shot at him, hitting the man in the shoulder.

After being detained for Janicki's murder, Mohammed refused to talk to investigators, simply answering "no comment" to all questions investigators asked him. However, when he was sentenced, he told investigators that Janicki had attacked him and that he shot Janicki in self-defense. This was dismissed by the court.

The weapon used in the crime was a Turkish 9mm P.A.K. Ekol Alp starter pistol converted to fire .380 ACP cartridges.

== Legal proceedings ==
On 19 December 2024, the now 18-year-old Mohammed who was 17 at the time of the murder, was charged with murder and aggravated weapons offences. Four other men were charged with aggravated protection of an offender and aiding and abetting aggravated protection of an offender.

On 6 March 2025, Stockholm District Court sentenced Mohammed Khalid Mohammed Mohammed to 14 years in prison for murder. He would have been sentenced to life imprisonment if he had been just a month older. The verdict was upheld by the Svea Court of Appeal on 5 June the same year.

The names of underage criminals are typically not publicised in Swedish media, however an exception was made for this case due to its notoriety.

== See also ==
- Murder of Adriana Naghei Ostrowska
- Killing of Paul Schmidt
- Murder of Henry Nowak
