= Bornsjön =

Lake in Salem Municipality, Sweden

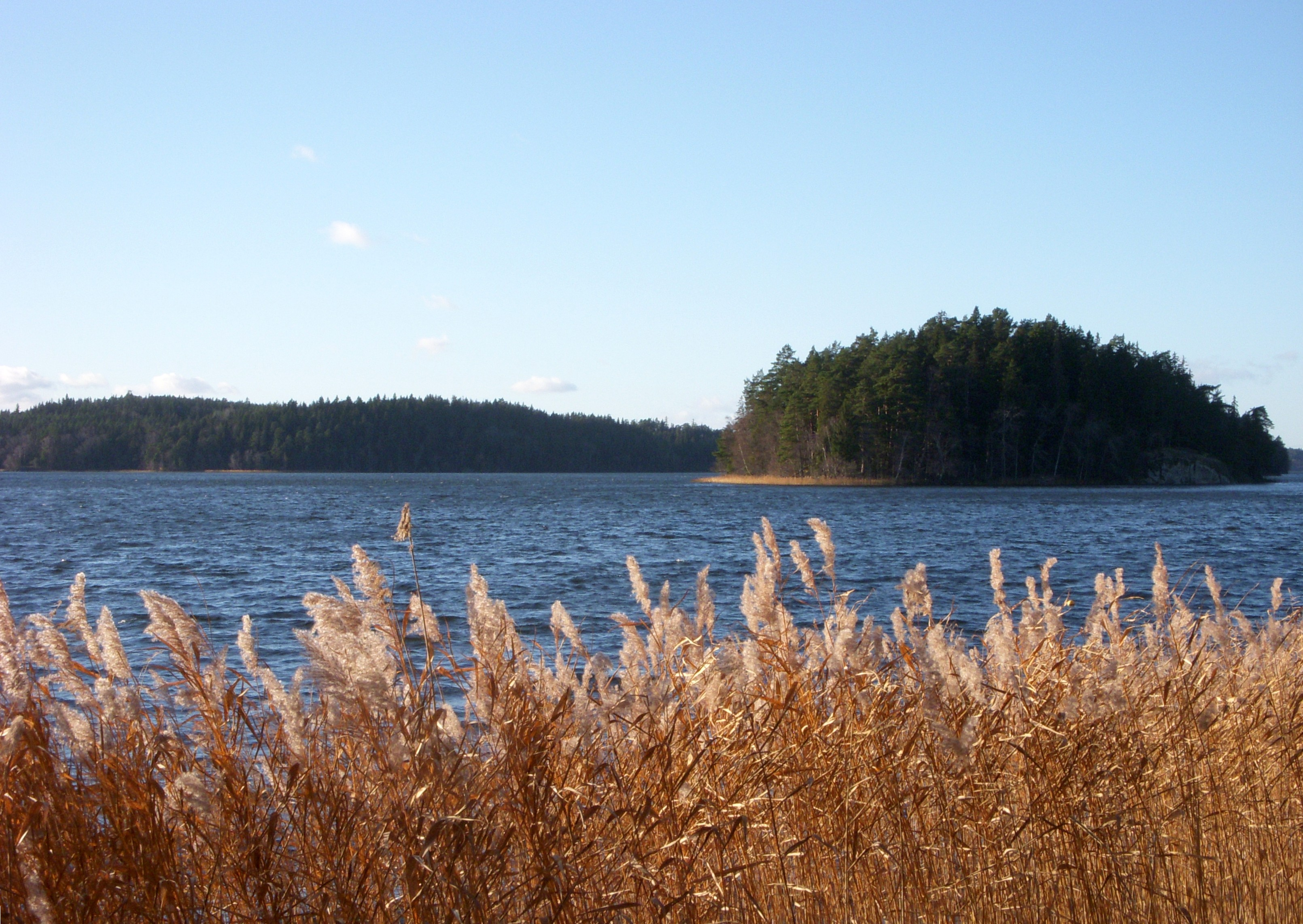

- Location within Stockholm
- Coordinates: 59°14.40′N 17°45.39′E
- Basin countries: Sweden

Bornsjön is a lake at Södertörn in Salem Municipality in Södermanland, Sweden. It is part of Norrström's main catchment area. The lake is 17 meters deep, has an area of 6.34 square kilometres (2.45 mi^{2}), and is 11 meters above sea level. In test fishing, a large number of fish species have been caught, including European perch, white bream, common bream, and ruffe.

The lake is within the boundaries of the Bornsjön Nature Reserve, and has been sheltered since 1920.
