= Rinkeby murder =

2002 murder in Stockholm, Sweden

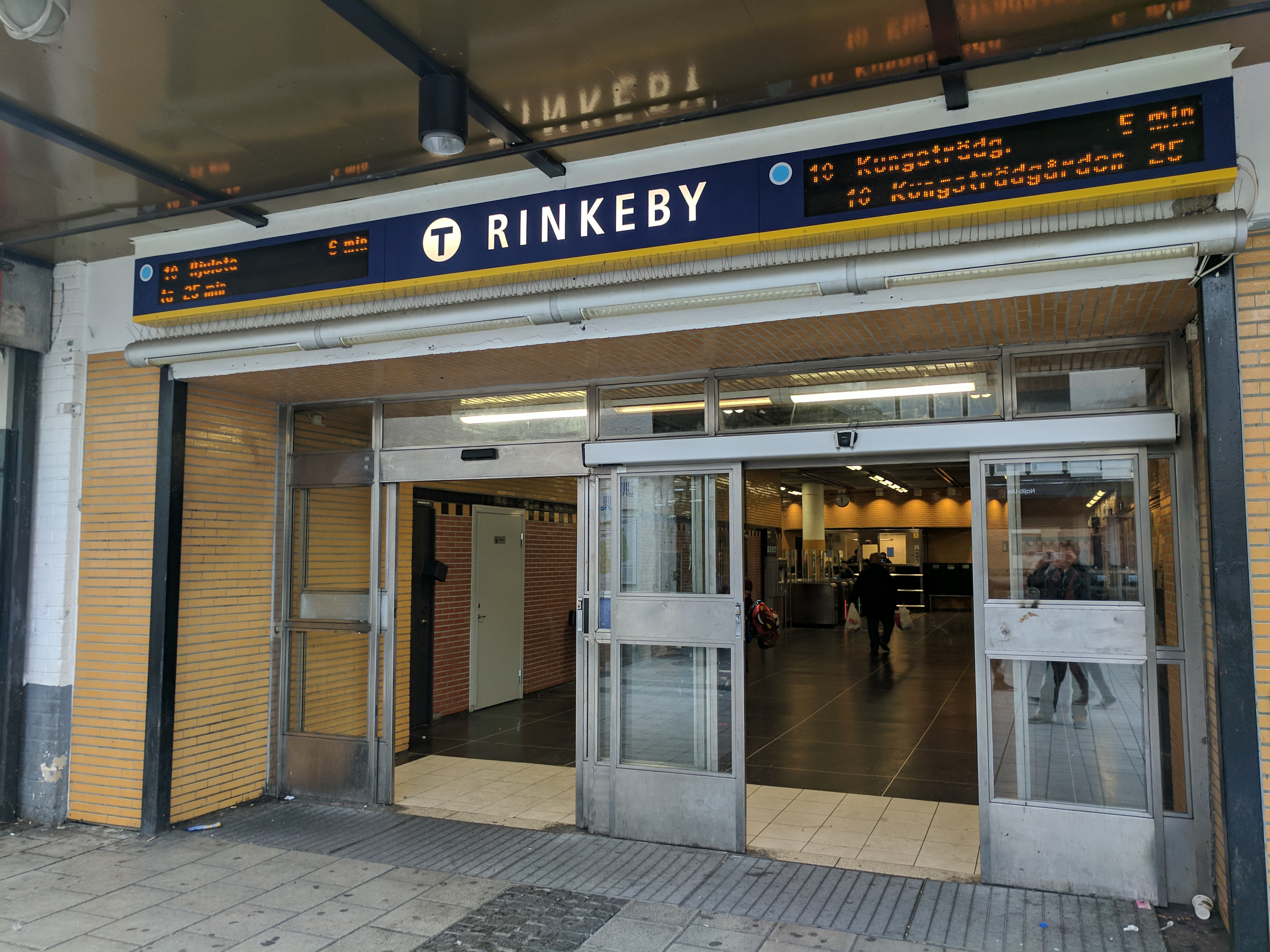
- Station entrance in 2017
- Location: 59.38840°N 17.92868°E; Rinkeby metro station, Stockholm, Sweden
- Date: 26 February 2002 (CET)
- Target: Radu Acsinia
- Attack type: Gun violence
- Weapon: Pistol
- Deaths: 1
- Victim: 1
- Perpetrators: 4, including Özcan Yildiz and Önder Yildiz
- Verdict: Guilty
- Convictions: Murder
- Sentence: Life imprisonment (Özcan Yildiz; paroled in 2016); 8 years (Önder Yildiz); 4 years juvenile detention (18-years old); 4 years juvenile detention (17-years old)

The Rinkeby murder (Swedish: Rinkebymordet) took place on 26 February 2002, when 19-year-old Radu Acsinia was shot to death at Rinkeby metro station on the Stockholm Metro, Sweden.

== Murder ==
On 26 February 2002, 19-year-old Radu Acsinia was shot dead with multiple gunshots at the entrance to Rinkeby metro station in northwestern Stockholm.

== Investigation ==
The youngest brother, then only 17 years old, confessed to the murder and the cousin admitted to having been at the scene. The other two brothers, Özcan and Önder Yildiz, who had grown up in Gävle, claimed that they were staying with relatives in Gävle when the murder was committed.

== Trial ==
Four relatives, three of whom were brothers, were convicted of murder on 24 June 2002, by the Stockholm District Court. The eldest of the brothers, 24-year-old Özcan Yildiz, was sentenced to life imprisonment. According to the court, the others avoided life sentences due to their young age. The verdict did not specify which of the four defendants held the weapon. The court found that the four had jointly and in agreement killed 19-year-old Radu Acsinia. The only witness, a subway ticket inspector, had been unable to identify any of the defendants. A 20-year-old brother, Önder Yildiz, was sentenced to eight years in prison, and an 18-year-old brother was sentenced to four years of youth detention. A 17-year-old cousin was also sentenced to four years of youth detention. On 23 October 2002, the Svea Court of Appeal upheld the life sentence for Özcan Yildiz.

== Aftermath ==
The legal case has attracted much attention and been described by Chancellor of Justice, Göran Lambertz, as yet another case that shakes confidence in the judicial system. The Rinkeby murder Committee – a volunteer network pressing for a retrial of Önder and Özkan Yildiz – was set up by Olle Schubert and Henrik Westander in 2006.

Defense lawyer Claes Borgström submitted a third application for a retrial to the Supreme Court of Sweden in the summer of 2009, after previous requests had been rejected. The Supreme Court then decided to request a statement from the Prosecutor-General. According to Olle Schubert of the Rinkeby Committee, one of the prosecution's key witnesses had come forward and admitted that he had lied during the trials. He had asked to withdraw his testimony and stated that the wrong individuals had been convicted. Schubert argued that the evidence had already been weak from the beginning and had now been reduced to almost nothing. The committee also claimed that the police had improperly summarized a recorded interrogation with the uncle, who had identified the brothers as being involved in the murder. His testimony had previously been questioned, as he had a criminal background and heroin addiction, and had retracted his statement shortly after making it.

Özcan Yildiz received a fixed-term sentence at the end of 2015 and was released in 2016.

== Books ==
The book Three Brothers (2005), by Christian Holmén and Dick Sundevall, deals with the Rinkeby murder.
