= Denho Acar =

Kurdish mobster originally from Turkey

- Born: 1974 (age 51–52); Midyat, Turkey
- Occupation: Mobster
- Known for: Founder of the Original Gangsters

Denho Acar (born 1974 in Midyat), also known as Dano, is a Swedish mobster of Assyrian descent and founder of the Swedish crime syndicate Original Gangsters (OGs).

== Biography ==
Acar was born to Assyrian Christian parents in the town of Midyat in southeastern Turkey in 1974, and moved to Bergsjön, a suburb of the Swedish city Gothenburg, in 1985. He was involved in a number of criminal activities in his youth and stood trial for the first time in 1991, for two cases of assault with a deadly weapon. In 1993, he founded the Original Gangsters and a year later, he was imprisoned in Denmark for armed robbery.

In 2007, Acar fled to the tourist resort of Marmaris in Turkey because the Swedish police want him for an arson attack on a cafe in Gothenburg. He has served in the Turkish Armed Forces, and has also been charged with forgery by the Turkish government as he used a bogus Swedish passport to enter the country. He cannot be deported, however, as he is a Turkish national and has never been granted full citizenship by Sweden.

In early 2008, it was announced that he would hand over the formal leadership of the Original Gangsters in Sweden to the former gang vice-leader, Wojtek Walczak. He is still the gang's overall leader, however, and claims that he is now focusing on expanding the gang into Norway, Germany and the Netherlands.

His permanent residence permit was revoked by the Swedish government in August 2008, on the grounds that he is no longer considered to be a resident in the country.
