= Eddie Moussa =

Association football player (1984–2010)

Personal information
- Full name: Eduard Moussa
- Date of birth: 20 March 1984
- Place of birth: Södertälje, Sweden
- Date of death: 1 July 2010 (aged 26)
- Place of death: Södertälje, Sweden
- Height: 1.70 m (5 ft 7 in)
- Position: Forward

Senior career*
Years	Team	Apps	(Gls)
2001–2010	Assyriska	159	(21)
2006–2007	→ Valsta Syrianska IK (loan)	7	(0)
- * Club domestic league appearances and goals

Eduard "Eddie" Moussa (Arabic: إدي موسى; 20 March 1984 – 1 July 2010) was a Swedish professional footballer who played as a forward.

== Club career ==
Moussa played in Sweden for Assyriska Föreningen during his career starting 2001 until his death, with one year as loan to Valsta Syrianska IK for the season 2006–2007. He played as an attacking midfielder or forward.

== International career ==
As his father was Assyrian from Lebanon while his mother from Syria, Moussa had acquired Lebanese citizenship to possibly play in the Lebanese national team.

== Death ==
At 2:22 am on 1 July 2010, Moussa, his brother Yaacoub and another person were shot in Café Oasen in Södertälje, Sweden, According to witnesses, three men came into the premises and began shooting. They then escaped on their scooters. Eddie and his brother Yaacoub Moussa died while their friend was seriously injured.
