= Forex Bank =

Swedish travel currency exchange

FOREX

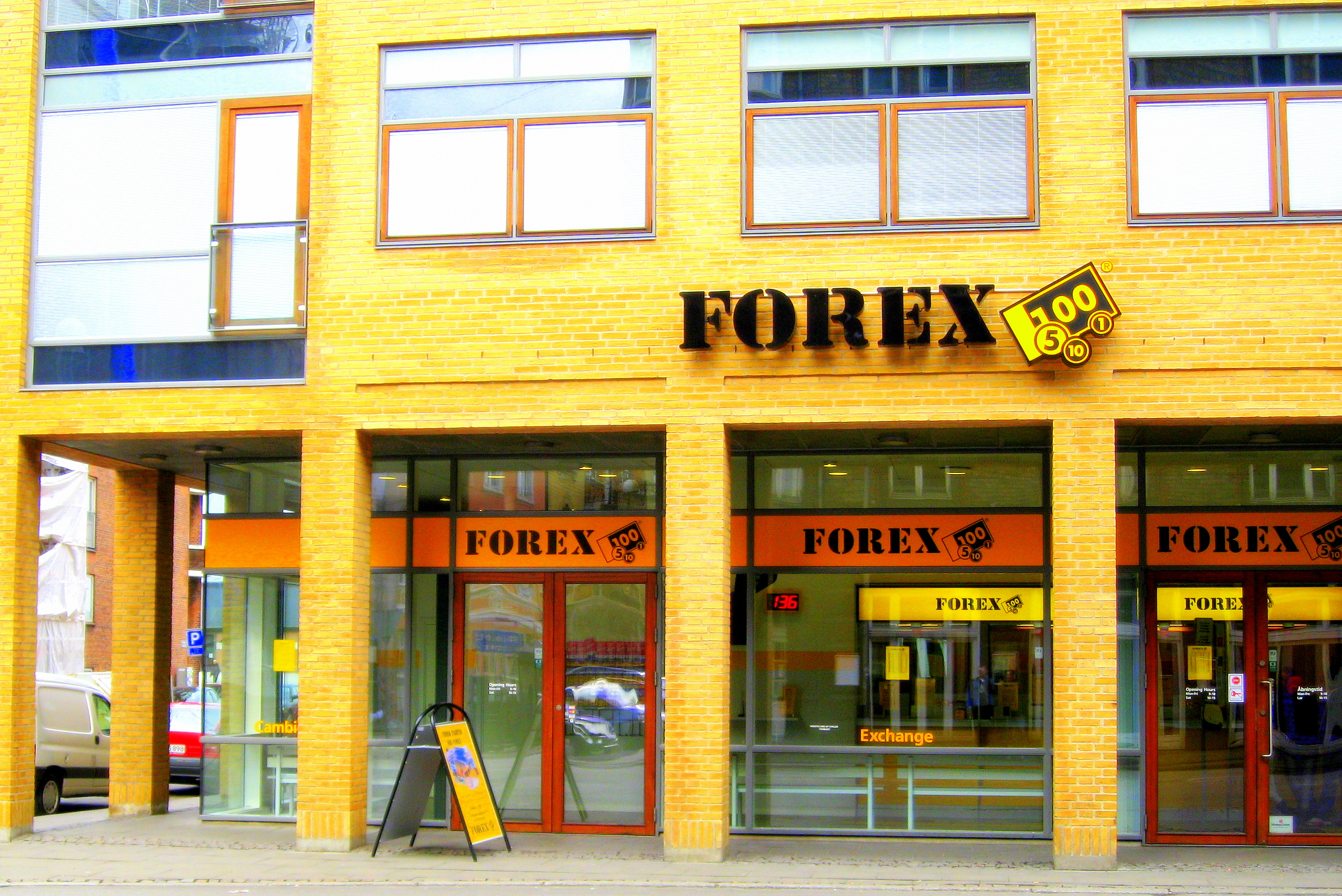
- Forex branch in Aalborg, Denmark (2009)
- Company type: Private
- Founded: 1927
- Headquarters: Stockholm, Sweden
- Key people: Annelie Nässén (CEO)
- Products: Foreign currency exchange
- Number of employees: 1238 (2013)
- Website: www.forex.se/en/

FOREX is a foreign exchange bureau in the Nordic region.

As of 2025, the company had 84 branches, principally located at railway stations or airports, but also shopping malls and high streets. The company also offers online current and savings account, loans, cash handling, money transfer, travel booking and payments.

== History ==
The company was started in 1927, it provided currency exchange for travellers at the main Stockholm Central train station. It is said that it started by the owner of Gyllenspet's Barber Shop at the station, when he discovered that most of his customers were tourists in need of currency for their trips. Therefore, the barber began keeping the major currencies on hand.

The company was subsequently acquired by Statens Järnvägar, the Swedish State Railways, which expanded the operations until it was sold to Rolf Friberg in 1965. The company was for many years the only non-bank business that was licensed to conduct currency exchange in Sweden.

The company, which is still wholly owned by the Friberg family, expanded into neighbouring Finland in 1993, Denmark in 1994 and Norway in 2004.

In 2003, the company extended its business into retail banking and also offered current and savings accounts including internet and mobile banking, loans, debit and credit cards, cash handling, money transfer and payments.

== See also ==
- Bureau de change
- Foreign exchange company
- List of companies of Sweden
