= Norra Fäladen =

Urban district in Lund, Sweden

Coordinates: 55°43′27″N 13°12′08″E

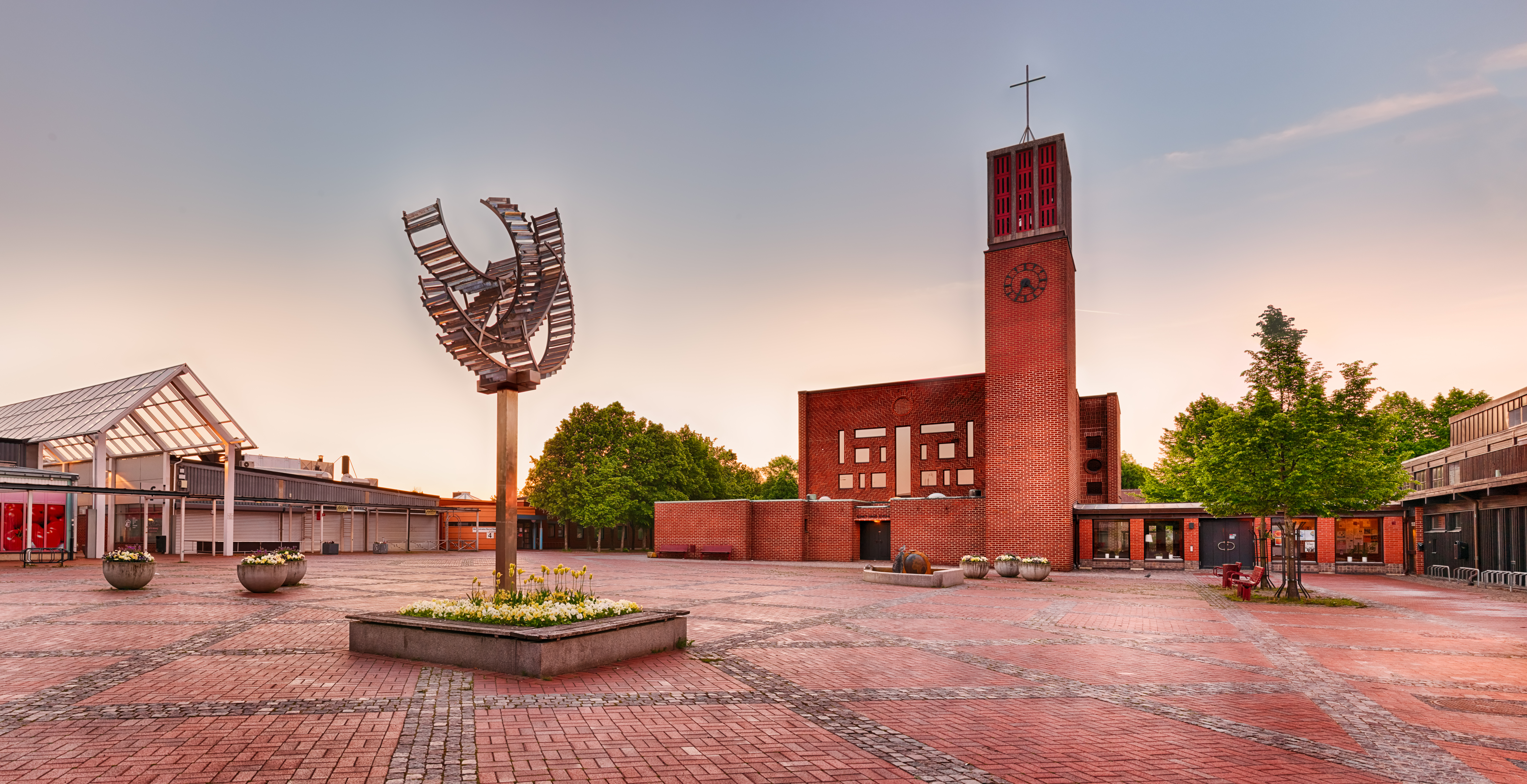
Fäladstorget square

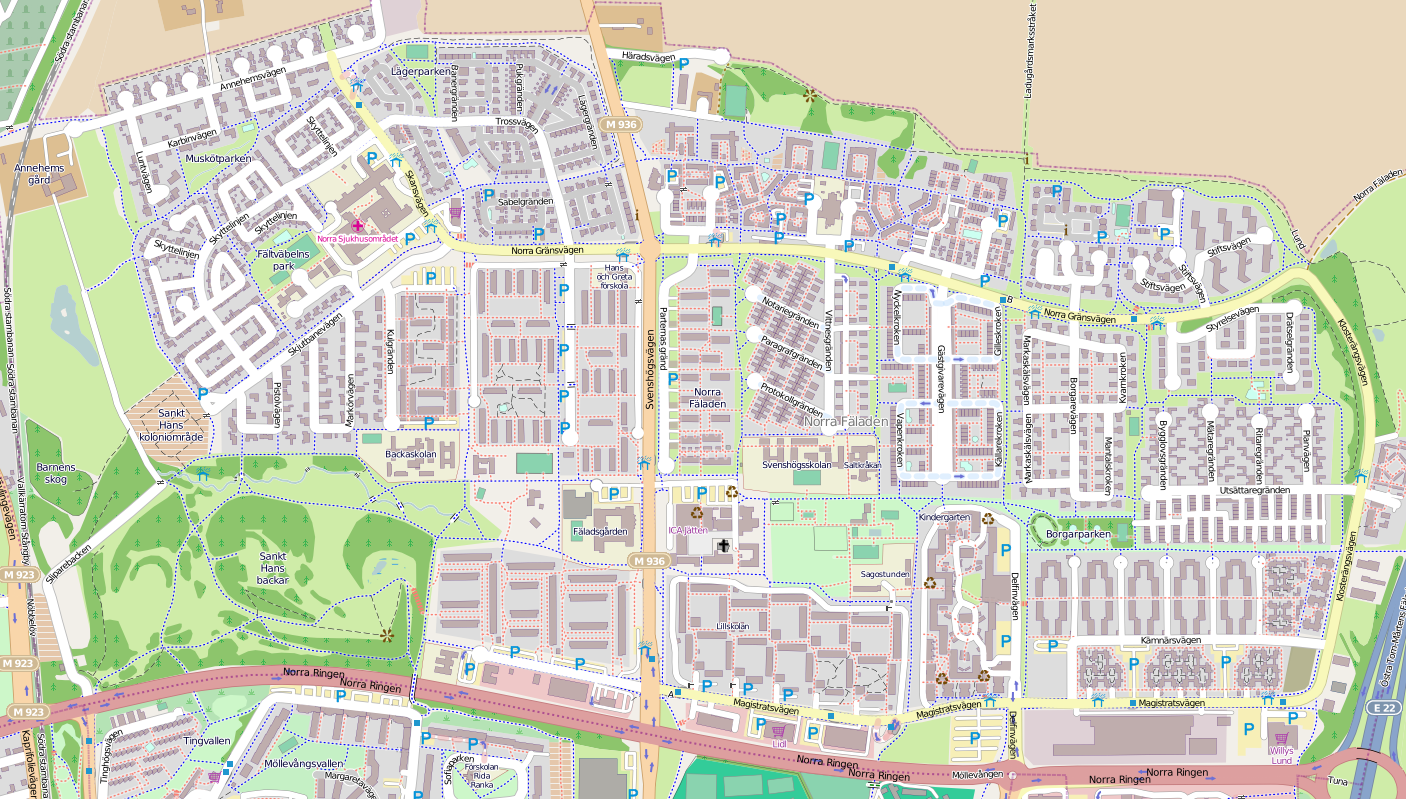
Map of Norra Fäladen

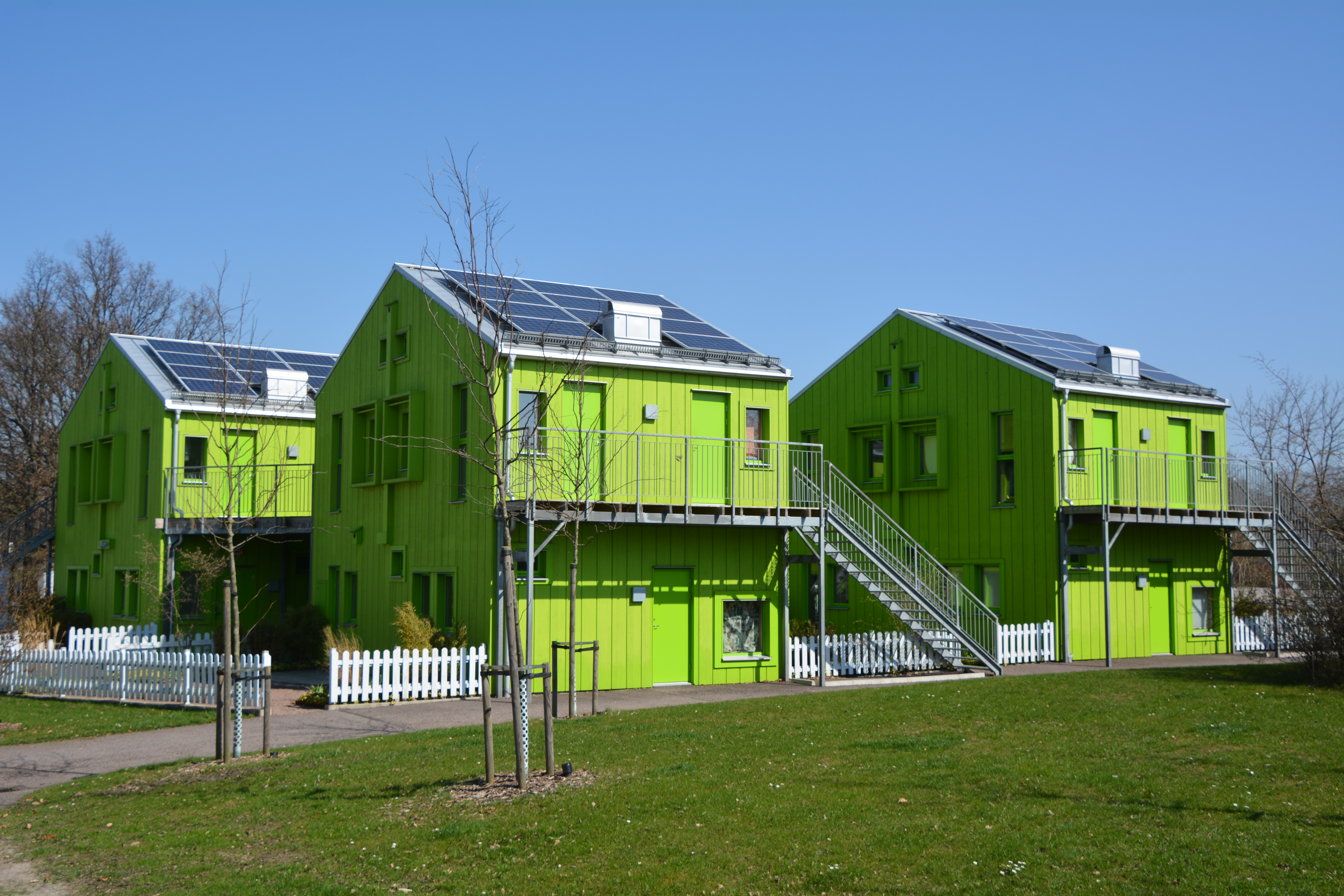
Student apartments provided by the AF Bostäder foundation in Kämnärsrätten, built in 2017

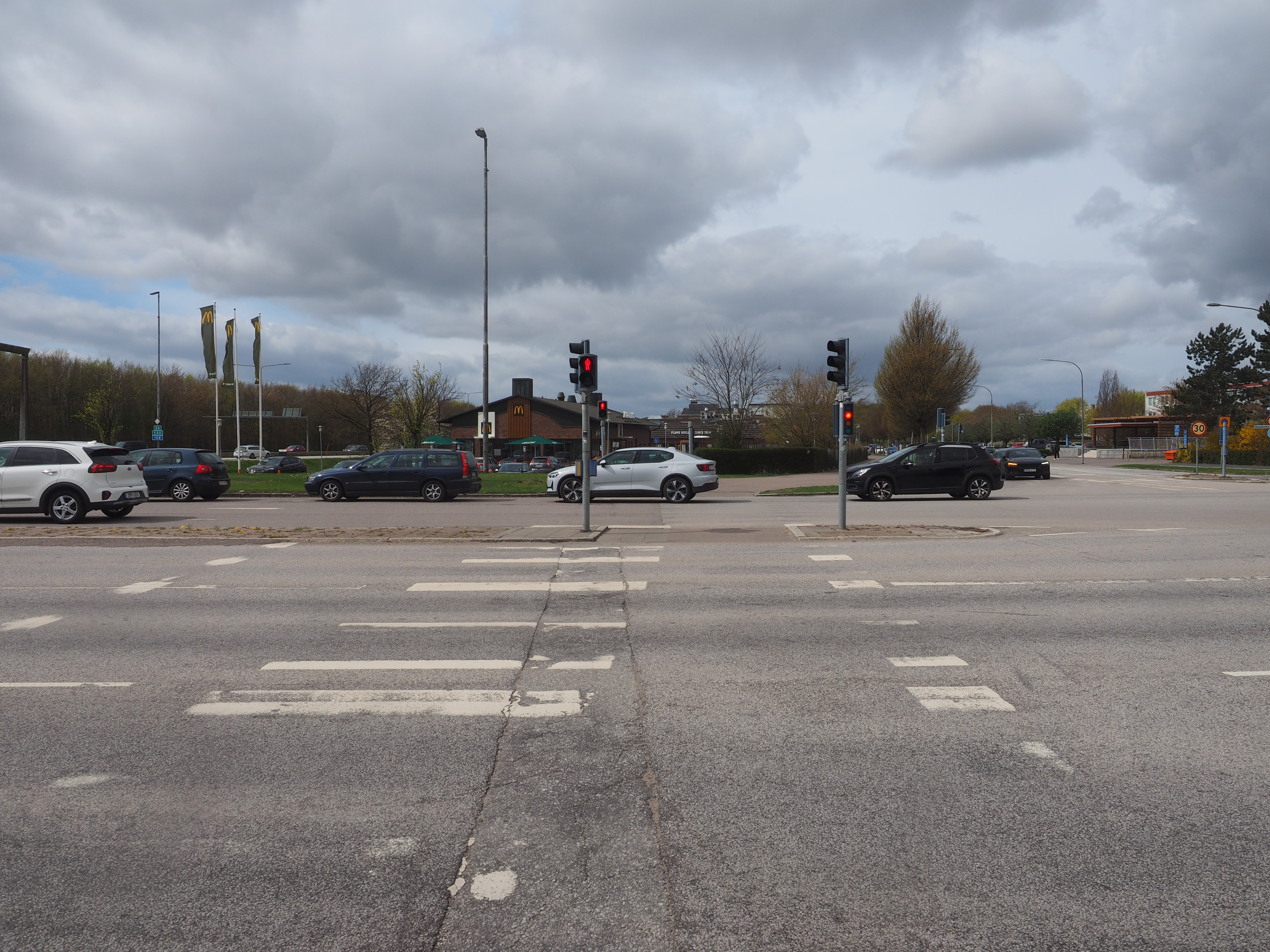
The street Svenshögsvägen effectively divides Norra Fäladen into a western and an eastern part.

Norra Fäladen is a city district in Lund, Sweden. It is located to the north of the major traffic line Norra ringen. In the eastern part of Norra Fäladen are the student residence areas of Delphi, Kämnärsrätten and Klosterängen, where a large part of the students at the Lund University live.

== History ==
Most parts of Norra Fäladen were built during the 1960s and 1970s, when there was an extensive program for building new apartments throughout Sweden, called the Million Programme. Upon completion of construction in 1972 Norra Fäladen had a population of 7000.

The Sankt Hans backar park is located in the western part of Norra Fäladen. The street Svenshögsvägen goes through Norra Fäladen in a north-south direction, leading to Stångby and Örtofta. In the middle of Norra Fäladen are the Fäladstorget square with food shops and the Saint Hans Church. There is a library at the school Fäladsgården, whose architecture and interior as well as its integration of various activities have earned it a unique status already upon its completion in the early 1970s. In 2007 Norra Fäladen had a population of 11,561. This had increased to 12,067 in 2013.

Because of its location on the northern border of the city, Norra Fäladen has continued to expand since the early 1990s, mostly at the areas of Ladugårdsmarken and Annehem, as well as the area near the European route E22. The western part of Norra Fäladen consists mostly of villas and link-detached houses while the eastern part consists mostly of apartment buildings. Today there are over 12,000 people living in Norra Fäladen and the population continues to increase as the district expands.

== Education ==
There are five schools in Norra Fäladen: a secondary school and four primary schools. The latest schools have resulted from a reorganisation in summer 2015.

The Fäladsgården school consists of classes 7 to 9 and has profiled itself through allowing students to go to a culture class or a sport class. The school was inaugurated in 1971 but differs greatly from the other schools built under the Million Programme because of its castle-like appearance with a closed inner yard, sloped structure, lobby and musical classroom which also serves a training room for local bands. The school was designed by the architects Yngve Lundquist and Hans Rendahl. At the entrance to the school there is the metal sculpture "En av våra" ("One of ours") by Alexander Calder.

As well as the schools, the municipality of Lund has other activities in Fäladsgården. These mostly concern municipal activities such as social services. Most of these activities have moved out. There is a district library in Norra Fäladen. The library is an integrated library for the citizens and the school and serves both as a school library and a general library. In 2011 the library was chosen as Library of the year in common with other school libraries in the area.

The other primary schools in Norra Fäladen are:

- Backaskolan, primary school 1972
- Fäladskolan, until 2015 known as Svenshögskolan, intermediary school 1969
- Ladugårdsmarkens skola, primary/intermediary school 1991
- Delfinskolan, primary school 2015
- Humleboskolan, 1976, discontinued after the semester 2004/2005.

Many children who lived in western Norra Fäladen (to the west of Svenshögsvägen) went to Lovisaskolan until 2015 which was part of the Norra Fäladen school area but was located to the south of Norra Ringen in the district of Möllevången.

== Commerce ==
=== Fäladstorget ===
There is a planned centre called Fäladstorget in Norra Fäladen, which is crossed by the street Svenshögsvägen. The Norra Fäladen librfary and the sports hall Fäladsgården are located to the west of Fäladstorget.

To the east of Svenshögsvägen are a shopping centre, a health care station and the Saint Hans Church. The shopping centre contains an ICA grocery store and a pharmacy of the Kronans Apotek pharmacy chain. In autumn 2017 the Diakonicentralen second-hand shop Uggleboden moved to Fäladstorget after 32 years in central Lund.

=== Magistratsvägen ===
There is a commerce and industry area at the southernmost part of Norra Fäladen, between the streets Norra Ringen and Magistratsvägen. The office of Baxter International, previously known as Gambro, is located there.

A Willys grocery store, until October 2003 knowns as Matex, is located on Magistratsvägen. Axfood bought the Matex store in January 2003. In 2010 Lidl got permission to build a store on Magistratsvägen.

There is a McDonald's in Norra Fäladen, which is also the only restaurant from the chain in Lund, after the one at Mårtenstorget closed down in 2016. The restaurant was complemented by a "food market" with smaller restaurants in a building behind the McDonald's in spring 2018.

=== Other areas ===
At the connection to Annehem on the street Skansvägen there is a store built for Netto. It was converted to a Coop store in March 2020.
