= Euroapotheca =

European pharmacy chain

UAB Euroapotheca
- Company type: Privately held company UAB
- Industry: Retail pharmacy
- Founded: 2007; 19 years ago
- Headquarters: Vilnius, Lithuania
- Area served: North Eastern Europe
- Key people: Asta Juodeškaitė (Acting CEO)
- Products: Pharmacies
- Revenue: €740 million (2019)
- Net income: €17.8 million (2019)
- Number of employees: 3,800 (2018)
- Parent: Vilniaus prekyba
- Website: www.euroapotheca.lt

Euroapotheca is a Lithuanian pharmacy retail company headquartered in Vilniaus. The company operates a chain of 916 pharmacies in Bulgaria, Estonia, Latvia, Lithuania, Poland and Sweden and is owned by Vilniaus prekyba.

== History ==
Euroapotheca was founded in 2007 as holding company for its existing pharmacies.

In 2018, Euroapotheca purchased the state owned franchise pharmacy chain Apoteksgruppen in Sweden which provided services to 186 pharmacies and owning three pharmacies of its own. The same year the 13 pharmacies Ülikooli Apteek and Medapta was purchased from Finnish Yliopiston Apteekki. Euroapotheca left the Ukrainian market in 2018.

In 2022, Euroapotheca and Finnish owned Oriola created a 50/50 joint venture by merging the Swedish pharmacy chains Apoteksgruppen and Kronans Apotek.

== Locations ==
As of 2017, the group has stores in 5 European countries:

- Lithuania: Eurovaistinė, 277 branches
- Sweden: 50% owner of Apoteksgruppen and Kronans Apotek, 192 branches
- Poland: Euro-Apteka, 72 branches
- Latvia: Euroaptieka, 55 branches
- Estonia: Euroapteek, 76 branches

== Former locations ==
- Czech Republic: Eurolekarna, 18 branches
- Slovakia: Eurolekaren, 10 branches
- Ukraine: Euroapteka, 4 branches
