= Sankt Hans backar =

Park in Lund, Sweden

Coordinates: 55°43′22″N 13°11′33″E

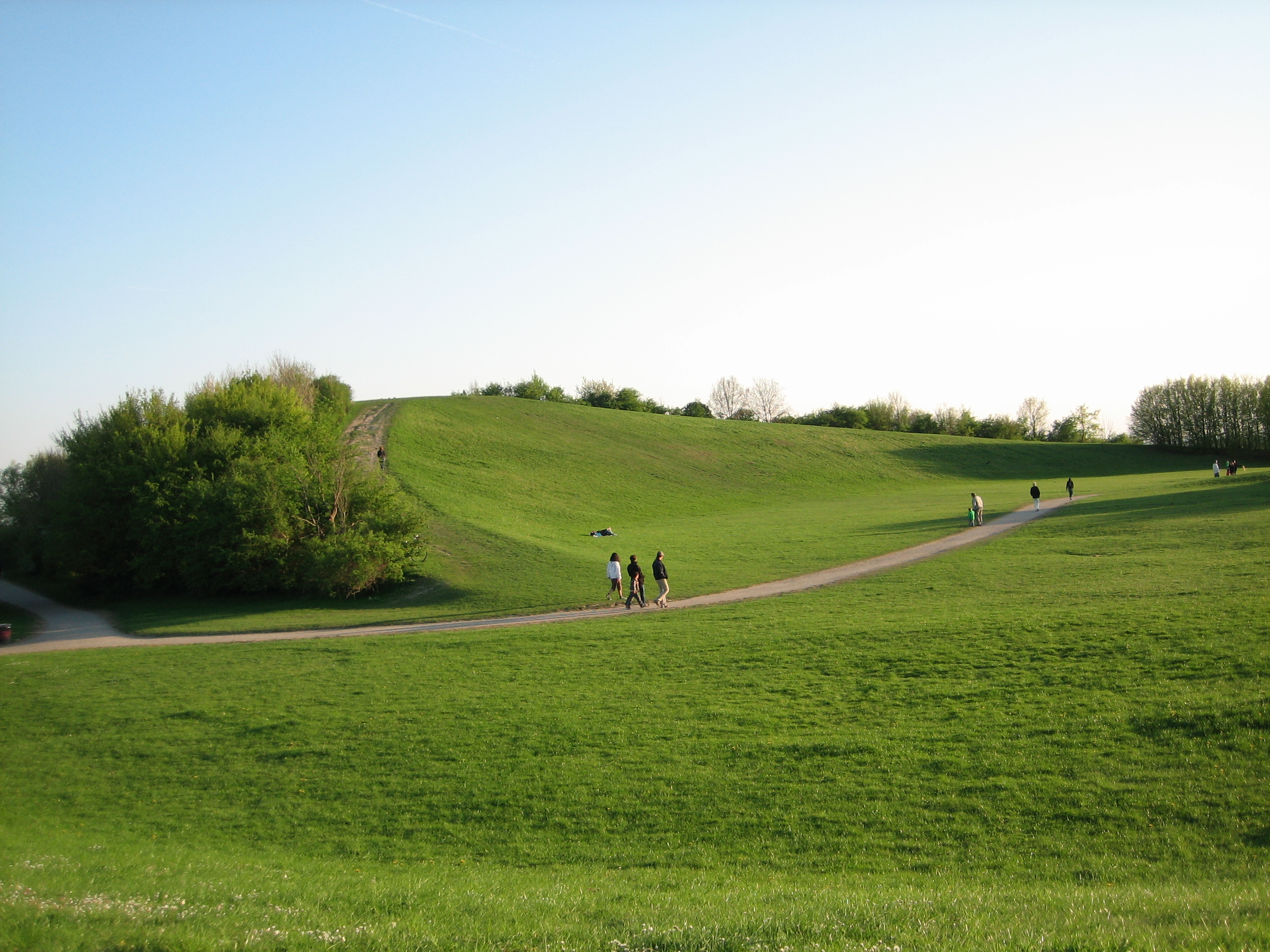
View of Sankt Hans hill in April 2009.

Sankt Hans backar is a park and recreational area on a hill located in Lund, Skåne, in the southernmost part of Sweden. The top of the hill reaches 85 metres (279 ft) above sea level.

The hill is mainly artificial but the area has served as a park and recreational area for the inhabitants of Lund for centuries. The present hill was originally a common where people from Lund could let their livestock graze. The area was also used as a park where people celebrated Midsummer's Eve around the formerly sacred Saint Hans (Saint John's Well) that was situated on the eastern slopes of the hills. The well has disappeared or been covered over and all attempts to retrieve it have been vain. In 1947 Lund Council turned the common into a waste disposal area. It remained in use until 1954. The modern recreational area was constructed in the 1970s, giving the area its current form. Pollution remained an issue – the Valkärra stream, which flows through the park, was contaminated by leaking water, leading to fish mutations – and the municipality financed a new decontamination project, starting in 2013, to protect water bodies in the area.

The park is the largest urban green space in Lund, surrounded by residential areas. It is a popular vantage point, offering a view of the town and its surroundings towards Öresund. Lundakarnevalen use the place to organize social events. There is an annual hill running competition, Sankt Hans Extreme, in the hills. An amphitheatre is planned to be constructed in the hills. The area is used by surrounding schools and preschools as an outdoor classroom.

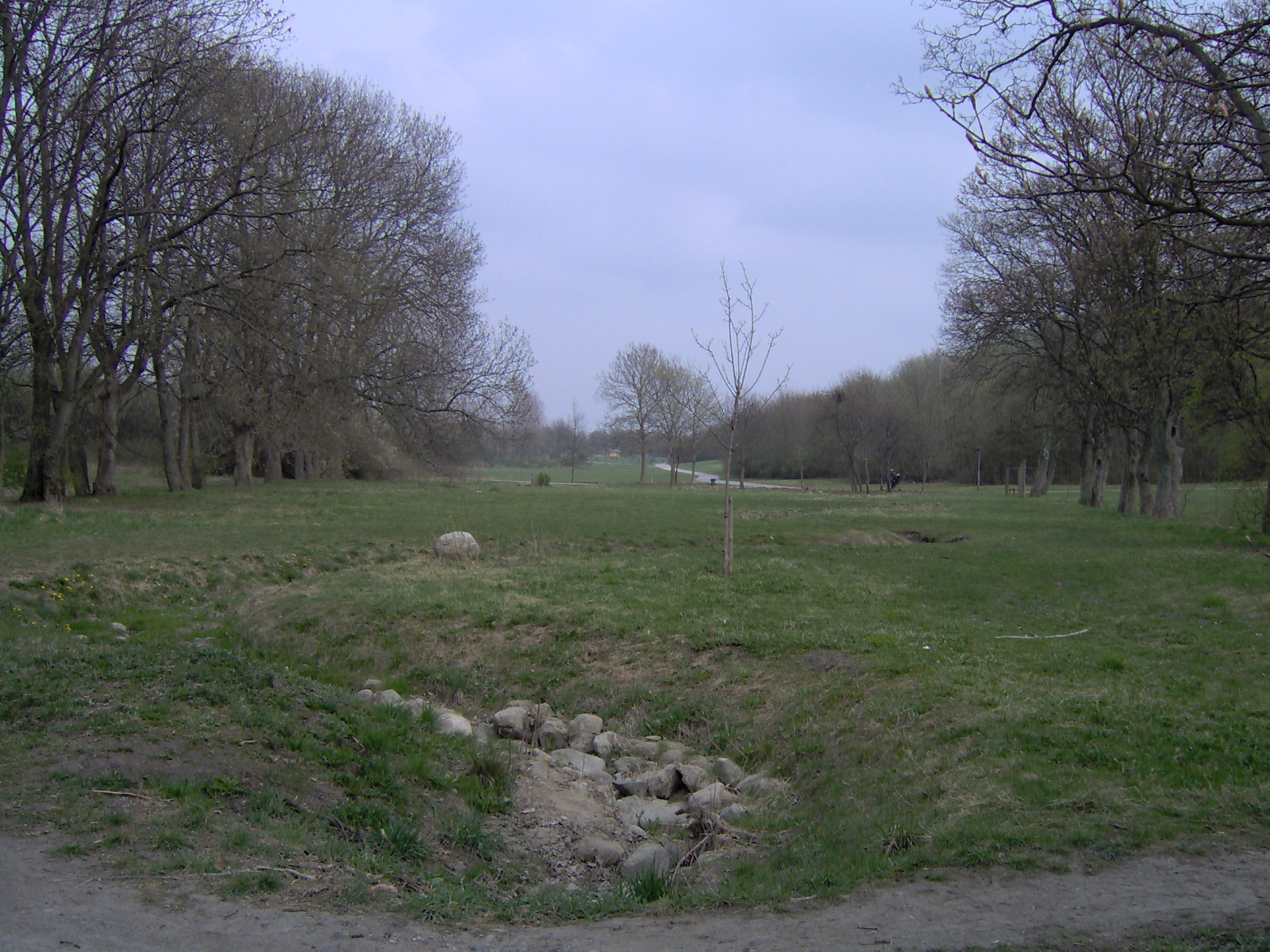
Vallkärra stream

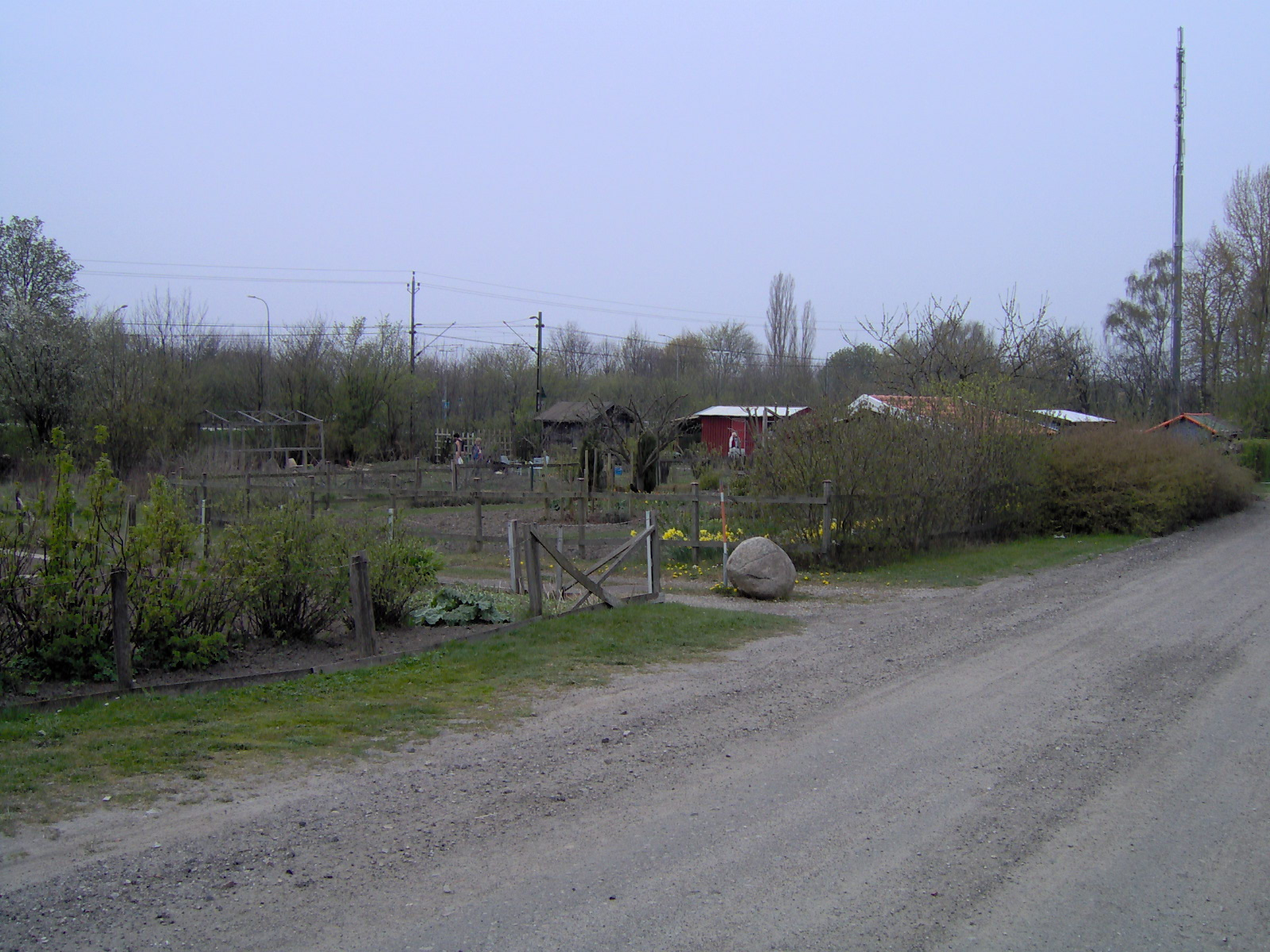
Allotment gardens

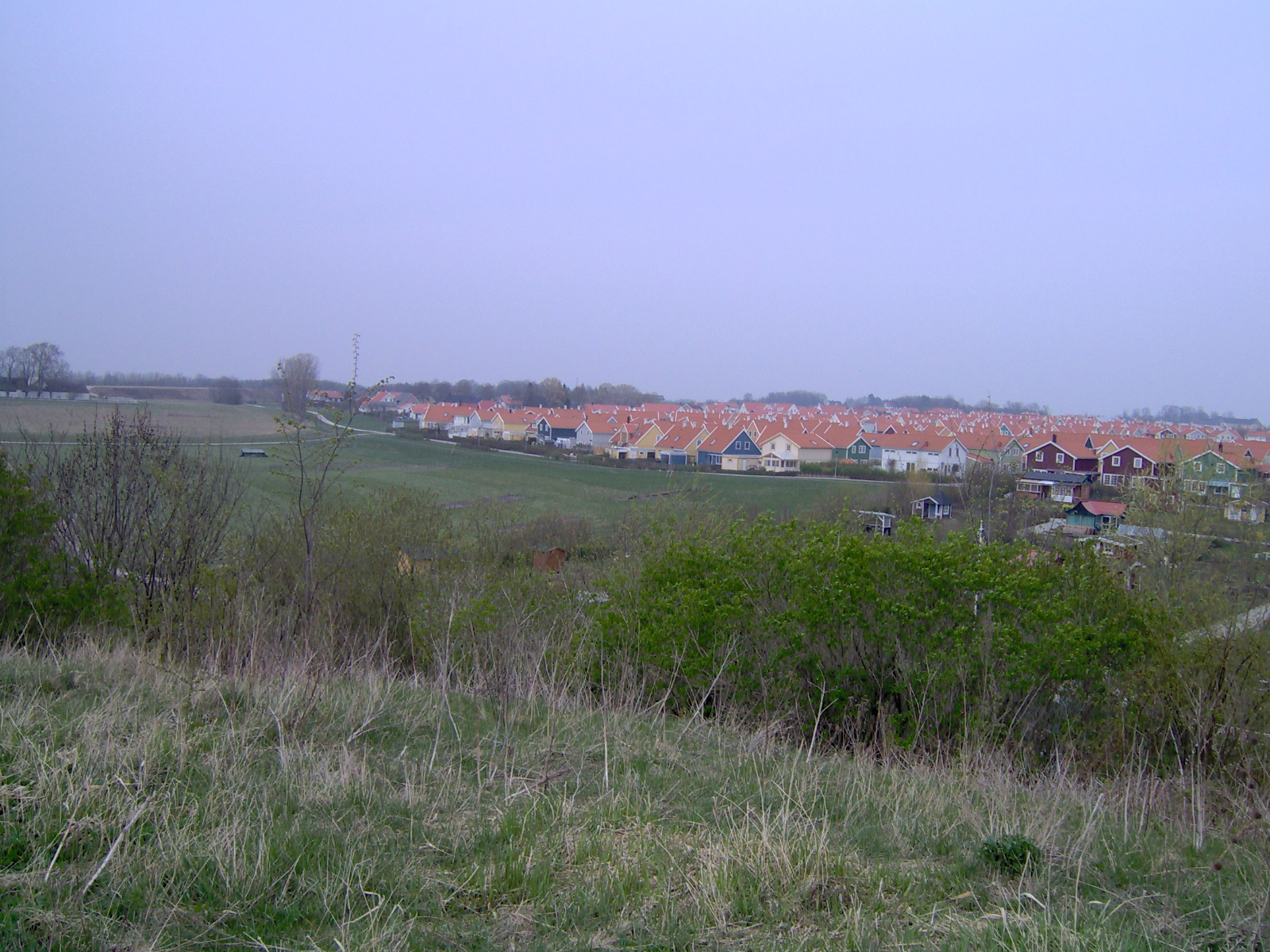
View towards Annehem, northward

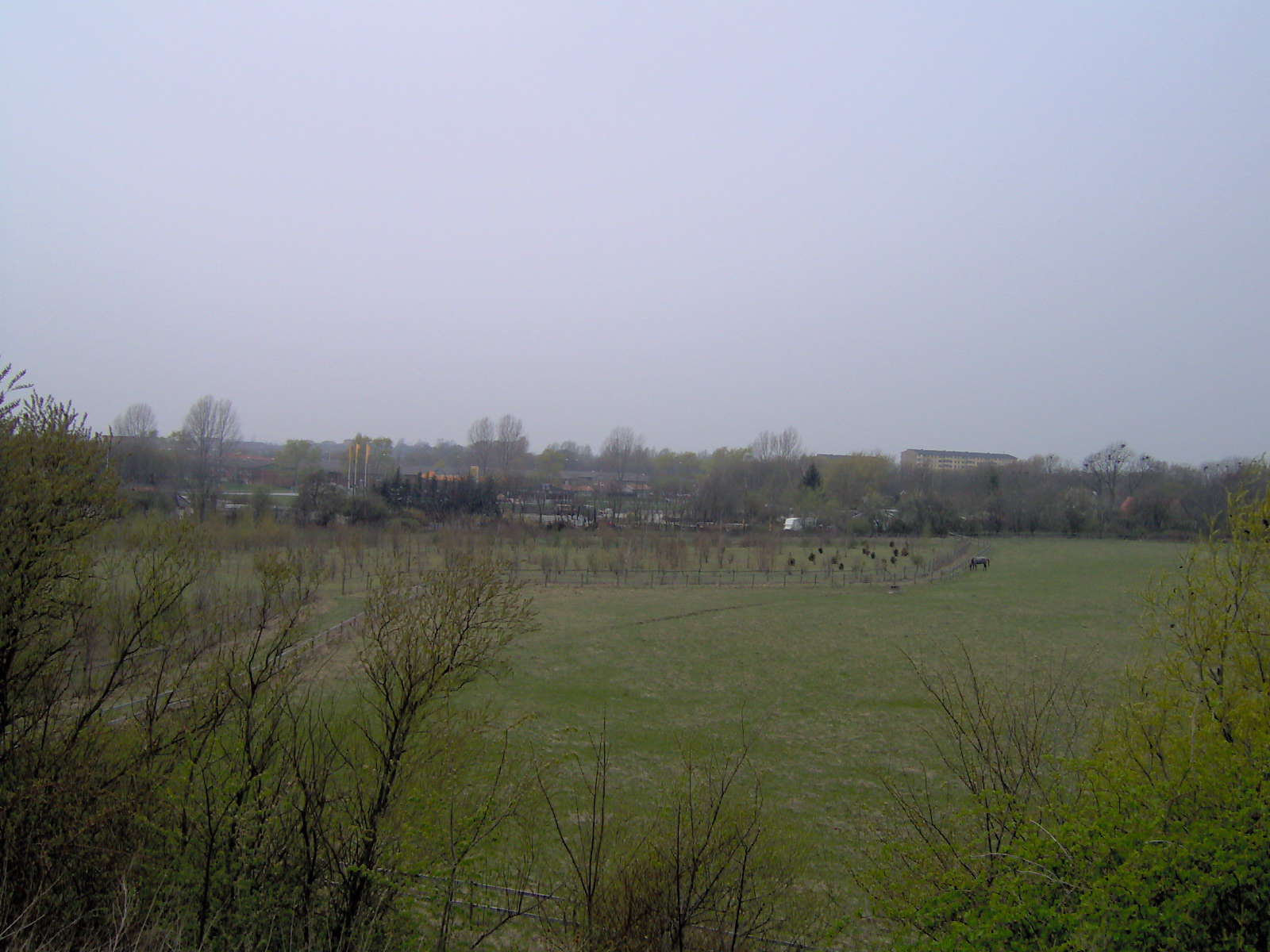
The view towards Norra Nöbbelöv, westward
