= Kronans Apotek =

Swedish pharmacy chain

Kronans Droghandel Apotek AB
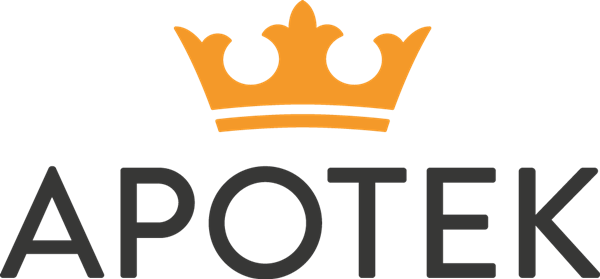
- Trade name: Kronans Apotek
- Company type: Subsidiary
- Industry: Pharmacy (shop)
- Founded: 1907; 118 years ago
- Founder: Gustaf Bernström
- Headquarters: Stockholm, Sweden
- Area served: Scandinavia
- Key people: Anders Torell (CEO); Anna Wallenberg (Salesdirector)
- Services: Wholesaling, Retailing
- Revenue: ▼7 billion SEK (2016)
- Number of employees: c. 2,600
- Parent: Oriola-KD
- Website: www.kronansapotek.se

Kronans Droghandel Apotek AB, doing business as Kronans Apotek, is a Swedish pharmacy company. The pharmacy chain is owned by the Finnish company Oriola Oyj-KD, which is listed on the Helsinki Stock Exchange. Kronans Apotek has 326 pharmacies across Sweden, and over 65,000 customer visits per day.

Kronans Apotek is Sweden's third largest pharmacy chain with more than 300 stores from Trelleborg in the south to Malmberget in the north. As of April 8, 2013, Kronans Apotek AB operates as a subsidiary of Oriola Oyj. Oriola is also a pharmaceutical wholesaler and also markets supplies. Since 2013, the company operates pharmacy operations under the name of Kronans Apotek. Kronens Apotek has a turnover of around 7 billion SEK a year. In Sweden, Laastari has begun to work with Kronans Droghandel Apotek. A company named ICT has previously handled the customer service to Kronans Apotek, which, through its owner early in 2013, bought the chain Medstop with 69 pharmacies.

After deregulation, Kronans Apotek expanded their supply chain to include retail stores. This resulted in existing retailers expanding their supply chain upstream, as did Apoteket Hjärtat, who now have their own supplier, Apo-Pharma. Through the agreement between Tamro AB and Kronans Apotek, a number of pharmaceutical companies undertake to distribute drugs on the Swedish market only through one of these companies. Nowadays, the association has been handed over to the Crown's drug distribution in Gothenburg, purchasing and reselling the drugs at the price determined by the association.

== Corporate affairs ==
Pharmaceuticals are delivered mainly to pharmacies from the wholesalers Tambro AB and Kronans Apotek, These two companies trade in pharmaceuticals, known as single-channel distribution. Wholesalers in Sweden, two companies hold licenses to supply medical goods to pharmacies, Kronans Droghandel (KD) and Phoenix. Both wholesalers hold a market share of approximately 50%.

=== Sales ===
In November 2017, total sales increased by more than 400% compared with the same period last year. The number of visits also doubled in comparison with the previous year.

== History ==
=== Early history (1700s-1959) ===
Apoteket Strutsen in Gothenburg was run by the pharmacist Franz Martin Luth in the early 1700s. In 1907, Gustaf Bernström became the owner of Kronans Apotek, and he also had a decisive influence on the pharmacy Lejonet between 1908 and 1920, when the sister who widowed Vitus Anderson formally stood as the owner of the pharmacy. In 1959 a consortium owned by the company Kronans Droghandel was bought.

=== Growth (1960-2009) ===
In 1964, sales in Kronans Apotek amounted to 31,3 million SEK, of which 28.0 million SEK were to pharmacies. Following the initialization of the apothecary in 1971, Kronans Droghandel continued with the distribution of pharmaceuticals to state-controlled Apoteket, later Apoteket AB. When the drug supply investigation in 1969 submitted its report these were: Apotekernes Droghandel AB, Kronans Droghandel, Apoteksvarva Vitrum Apotekare, Astra Distribution and AB Pharmaceutical Distribution.

=== 2009-present ===
The company was owned 80% by Oriola, and 20% by Kooperativa Förbundet KF. As of November 2012, Kronans Droghandel is owned 100% by Oriola-KD. In 2013, Oriola-KD acquired a Swedish pharmacy chain Medstop, Medstop and Kronans Droghandel were merged into a single pharmacy chain, Kronans Apotek. The purchase meant that the market share was 21% and comprised 290 pharmacies. It also meant that the addition of KD helped boost the company's distribution wing to represent some 72% of Orion's total revenue. That company remained separate from Oriola. In September 2017, Kronans Apotek was nominated for Svenska Designpriset along with at least 4 apps. On January 1, 2018, Kronans Apotek will replace old plastic bags with new ones with 100% recycled plastic LDPE.

In 2022, the Lithuanian company Euroapotheca and Oriola-kD created a 50/50 joint venture by merging the Swedish pharmacy chains Apoteksgruppen and Kronans Apotek. The combined chain will carry the name Kronans Apotek.

== See also ==
- Medicine
- Apoteket
- Helsinki Stock Exchange
