= Sorgenfri (disambiguation) =

Sorgenfri (without sadness) may refer to

- Sorgenfri, a suburb of Copenhagen, Denmark
  - Sorgenfri station, a railway station there
- Sorgenfri Palace, a palace in Denmark
- Sorgenfri, Trøndelag, a district in Trondheim, Norway
- Sorgenfri, Troms, a district in Tromsø, Norway
- Sorgenfri, settlement on Saint Thomas, U.S. Virgin Islands.
- Sorgenfri (novel), a crime novel by Jo Nesbø
- Sorgenfri (magazine), a street magazine in Trondheim, Norway
- Sorgenfri is a neighbourhood of Malmö, Sweden, divided into the western, eastern and industrial parts.
