= Malmö Concert Hall =

Malmö Concert Hall could refer to:

- Malmö Old Concert Hall
- Malmö Live, an event center including a concert hall opened in 2015
