= Centrum, Malmö =

Centrum
- Former city district
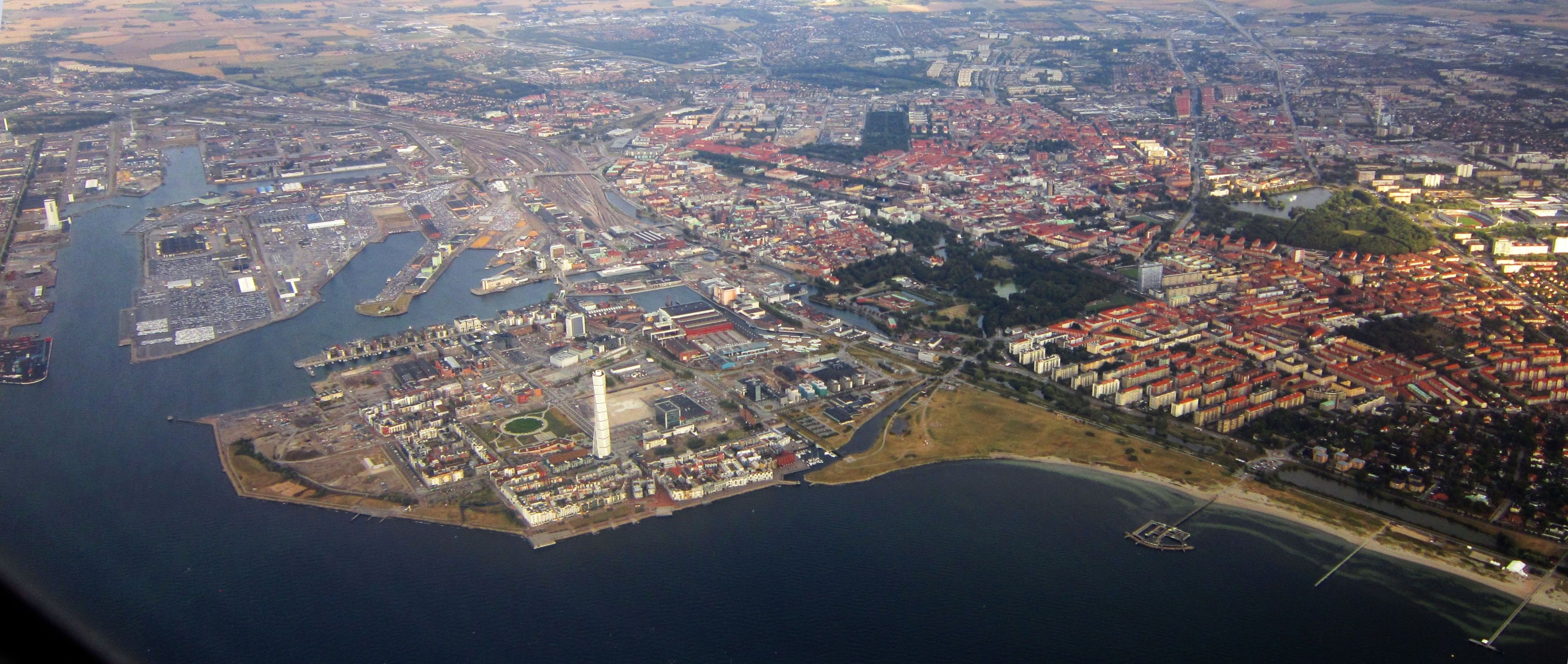
- Aerial view of central Malmö.

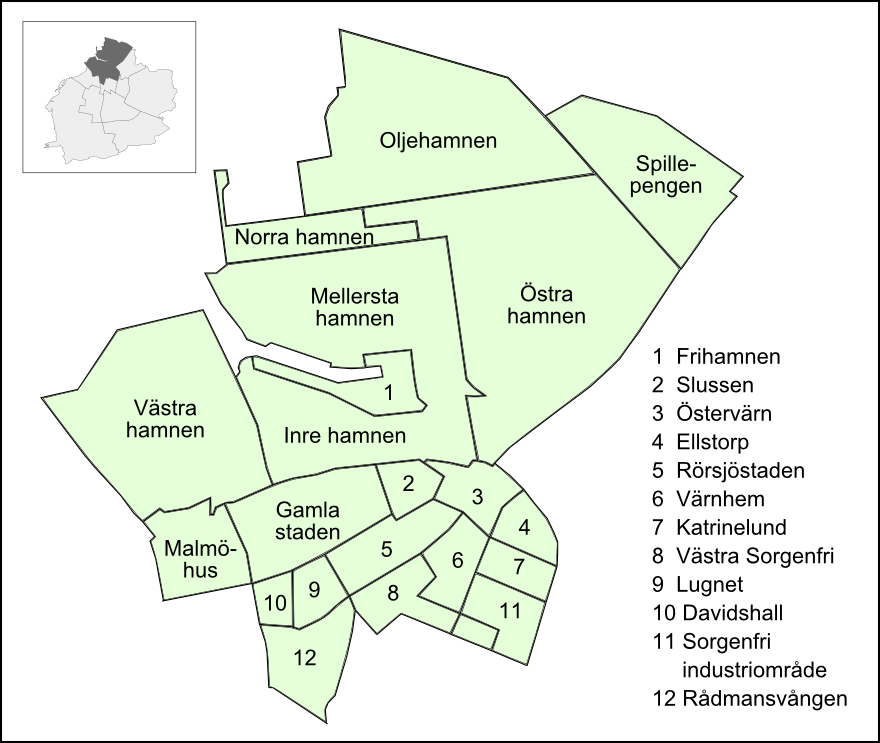
- Centrum's neighbourhoods
- Country: Sweden
- Province: Scania
- County: Skåne County
- Municipality: Malmö Municipality

Area
  - Total: 1,757 ha (4,340 acres)

Population (2012)
  - Total: 47,171
  - Density: 2,685/km^{2} (6,953/sq mi)
- Time zone: UTC+01:00 (CET)
  - Summer (DST): UTC+02:00 (CEST)

Centrum was a city district (Swedish: stadsdel) in the north of Malmö Municipality, Sweden. On 1 July 2013, it was merged with Kirseberg, forming Norr. In 2012, Centrum had a population of 47,171 of the municipality's 307,758. The area was 1,757 hectares.

== Neighbourhoods ==
The neighbourhoods of Centrum were:

- Davidshall
- Ellstorp
- Frihamnen
- Gamla staden
- Inre hamnen
- Katrinelund
- Lugnet
- Malmöhus
- Mellersta hamnen
- Norra hamnen
- Oljehamnen
- Rådmansvången
- Rörsjöstaden
- Slussen
- Sorgenfri industriområde
- Spillepengen
- Värnhem
- Västra hamnen
- Västra Sorgenfri
- Östervärn
- Östra hamnen
