= Rådmansvången =

- Neighbourhood
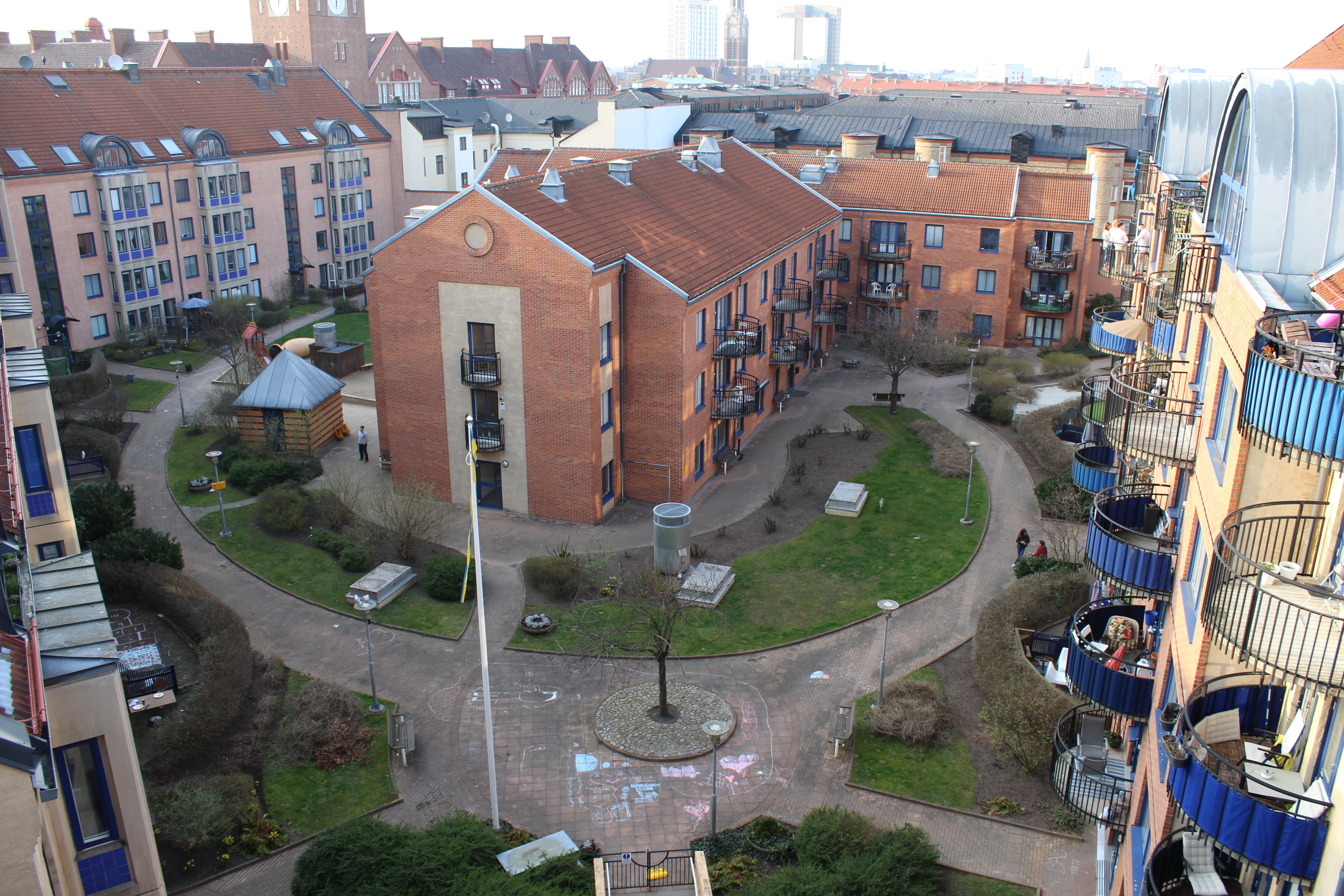
- Apartment buildings in Rådmansvången.
- Interactive map of Rådmansvången
- Coordinates: 55°35′43″N 13°00′11″E
- Country: Sweden
- Province: Skåne
- County: Skåne County
- Municipality: Malmö Municipality
- Borough of Malmö: Centrum

Population (1 January 2011)
  - Total: 6,680
- Time zone: UTC+1 (CET)
  - Summer (DST): UTC+2 (CEST)

Rådmansvången is a neighbourhood of Malmö, situated in the Borough of Centrum, Malmö Municipality, Skåne County, Sweden.
