= Norra Sofielund =

- Neighbourhood
- Interactive map of Norra Sofielund
- Coordinates: 55°35′09″N 13°00′55″E
- Country: Sweden
- Province: Skåne
- County: Skåne County
- Municipality: Malmö Municipality
- Borough of Malmö: Södra Innerstaden

Population (2021)
  - Total: 4,080
- Time zone: UTC+1 (CET)
  - Summer (DST): UTC+2 (CEST)

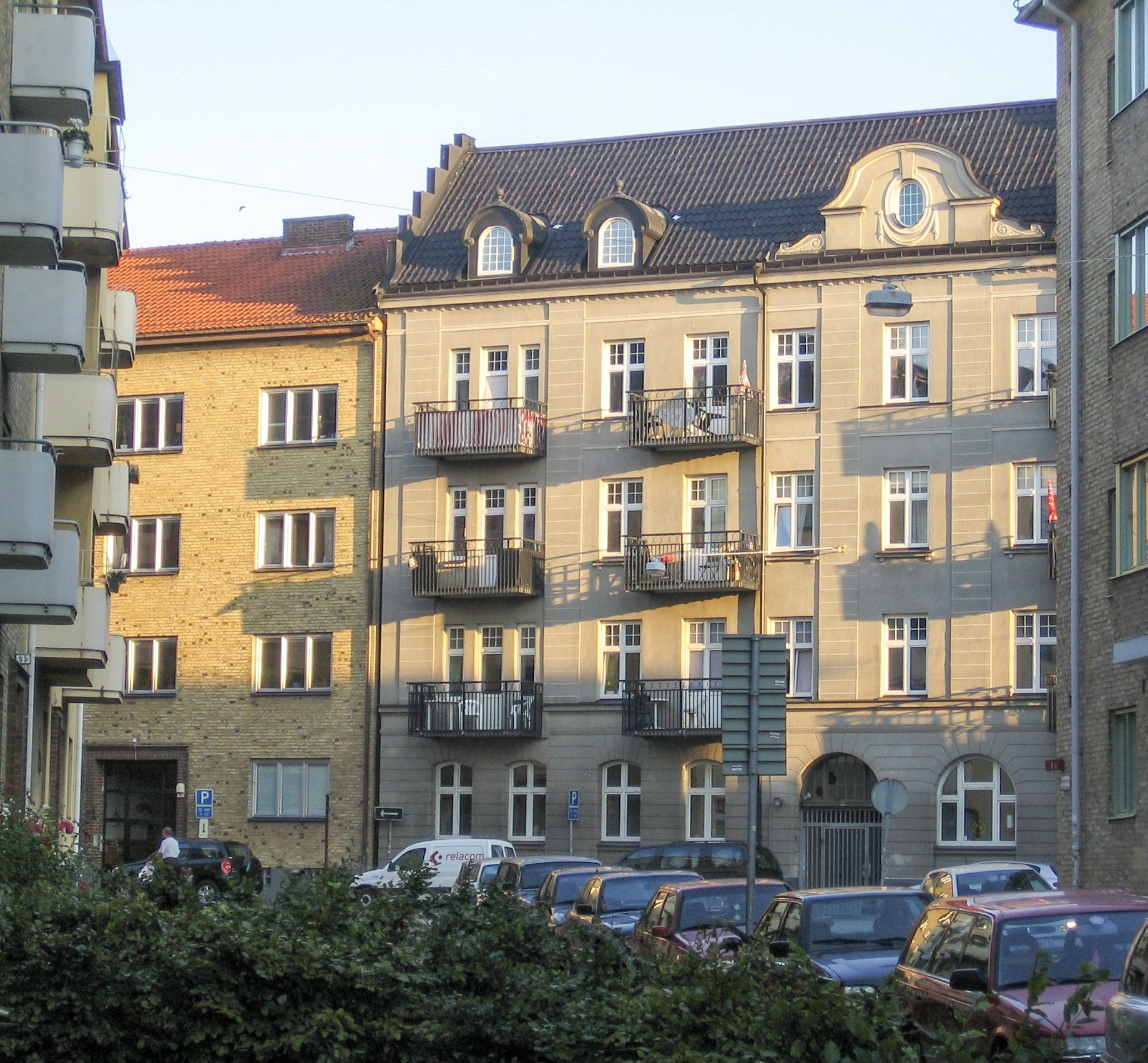

Norra Sofielund is a neighbourhood of Malmö, situated in the Borough of Södra Innerstaden, Malmö Municipality, Skåne County, Sweden.
