= Davidshall =

Neighbourhood of Malmö, Sweden

- Neighbourhood
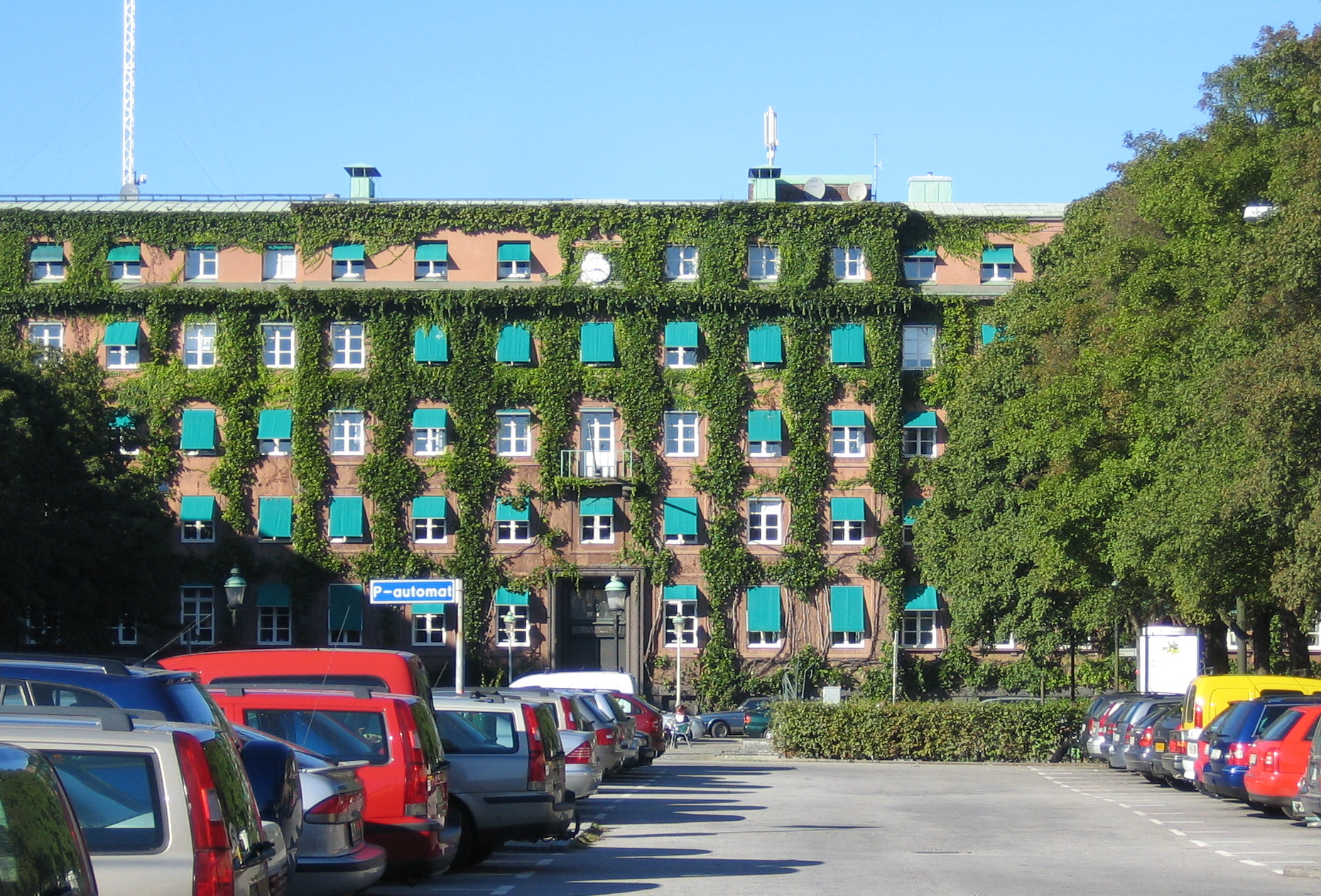
- Interactive map of Davidshall
- Coordinates: 55°35′56″N 12°59′54″E
- Country: Sweden
- Province: Skåne
- County: Skåne County
- Municipality: Malmö Municipality
- Borough of Malmö: Centrum

Population (1 January 2011)
  - Total: 2,510
- Time zone: UTC+1 (CET)
  - Summer (DST): UTC+2 (CEST)

Davidshall is a neighbourhood of Malmö, situated in the Borough of Centrum, Malmö Municipality, Skåne County, Sweden.

The urban plan for the area was drawn up in 1924 by the then city engineer Erik Bülow-Hübe. The buildings around the square in the 1920s classicist style were built between 1928 and 1934, some by the builder Eric Sigfrid Persson. The southern part of the square, which is now used as a car park, was originally intended for a building for Malmö City Library, which never materialised.
