= Östra hamnen =

- Neighbourhood
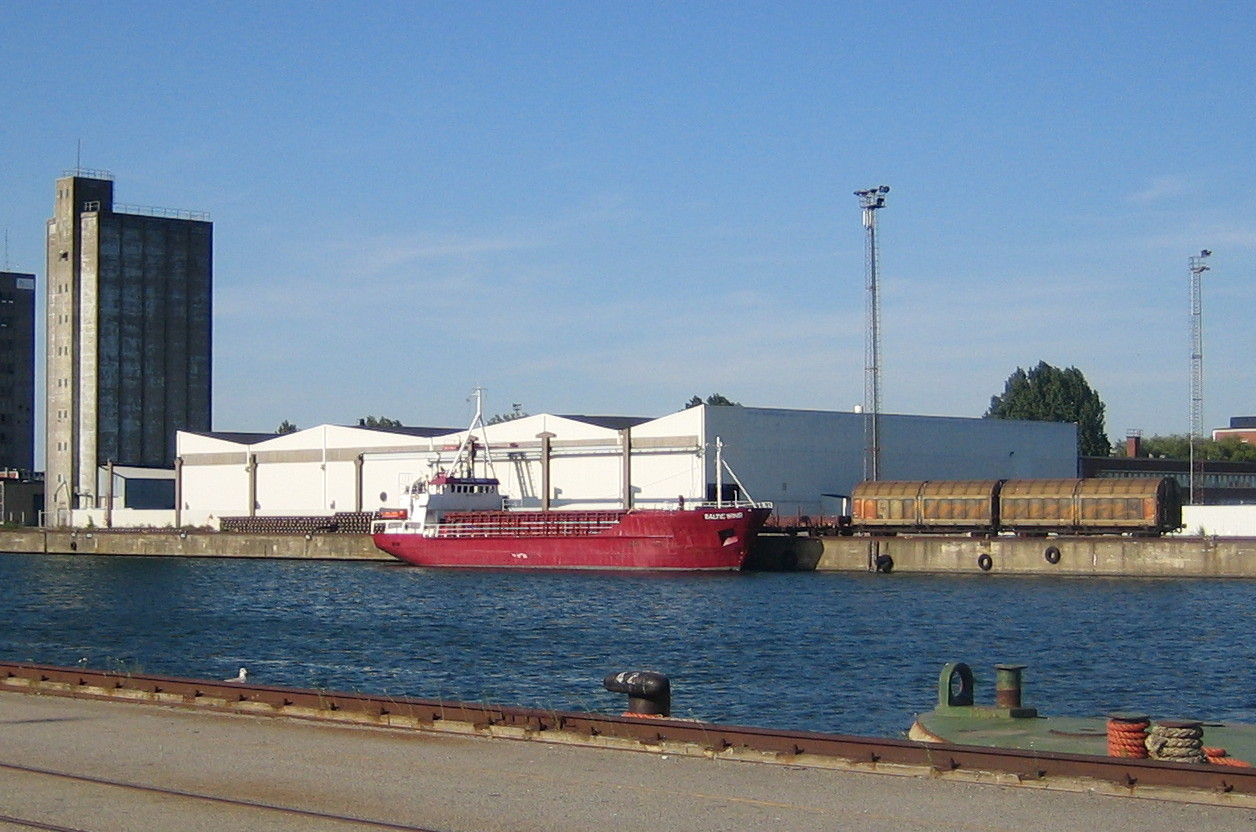
- Interactive map of Östra hamnen
- Coordinates: 55°37′9″N 13°2′6″E
- Country: Sweden
- Province: Skåne
- County: Skåne County
- Municipality: Malmö Municipality
- Borough of Malmö: Centrum

Population (1 January 2011)
  - Total: 6
- Time zone: UTC+1 (CET)
  - Summer (DST): UTC+2 (CEST)

Östra hamnen ("Eastern Harbour") is a neighbourhood of Malmö, situated in the Borough of Centrum, Malmö Municipality, Skåne County, Sweden.
