= Annelund, Malmö =

Neighbourhood in Malmö, Sweden

Annelund
- Neighbourhood
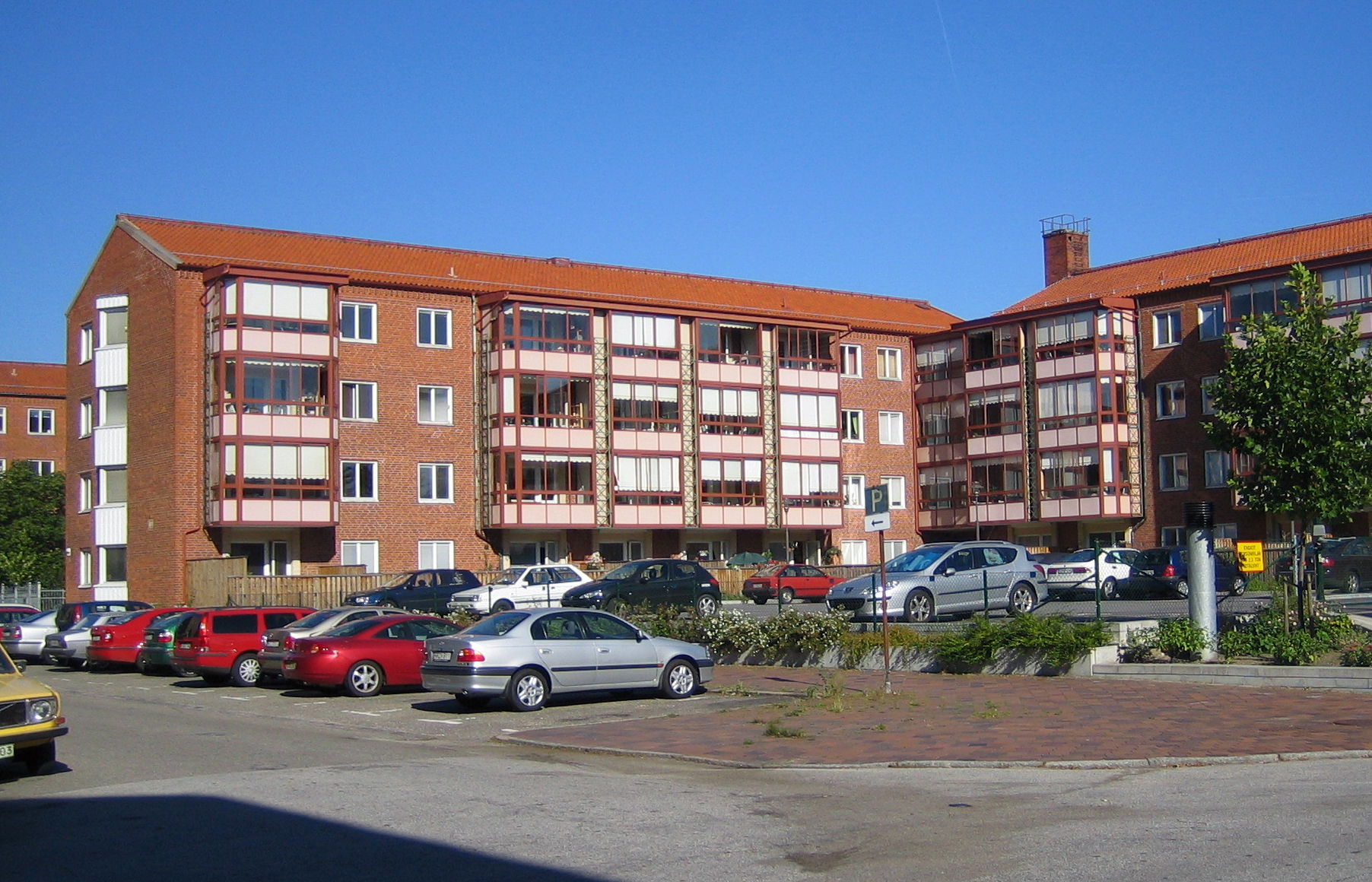
- Interactive map of Annelund
- Coordinates: 55°35′21″N 13°01′21″E
- Country: Sweden
- Province: Skåne
- County: Skåne County
- Municipality: Malmö Municipality
- Borough of Malmö: Södra Innerstaden

Population (1 January 2011)
  - Total: 1,927
- Time zone: UTC+1 (CET)
  - Summer (DST): UTC+2 (CEST)

Annelund is a neighbourhood of Malmö, situated in the Borough of Södra Innerstaden, Malmö Municipality, Skåne County, Sweden. As of 2008 it had 1794 inhabitants and covers an area of 17 hectares.
