= Malmö Old Concert Hall =

Swedish concert hall

Coordinates: 55°35′57″N 13°0′28″E

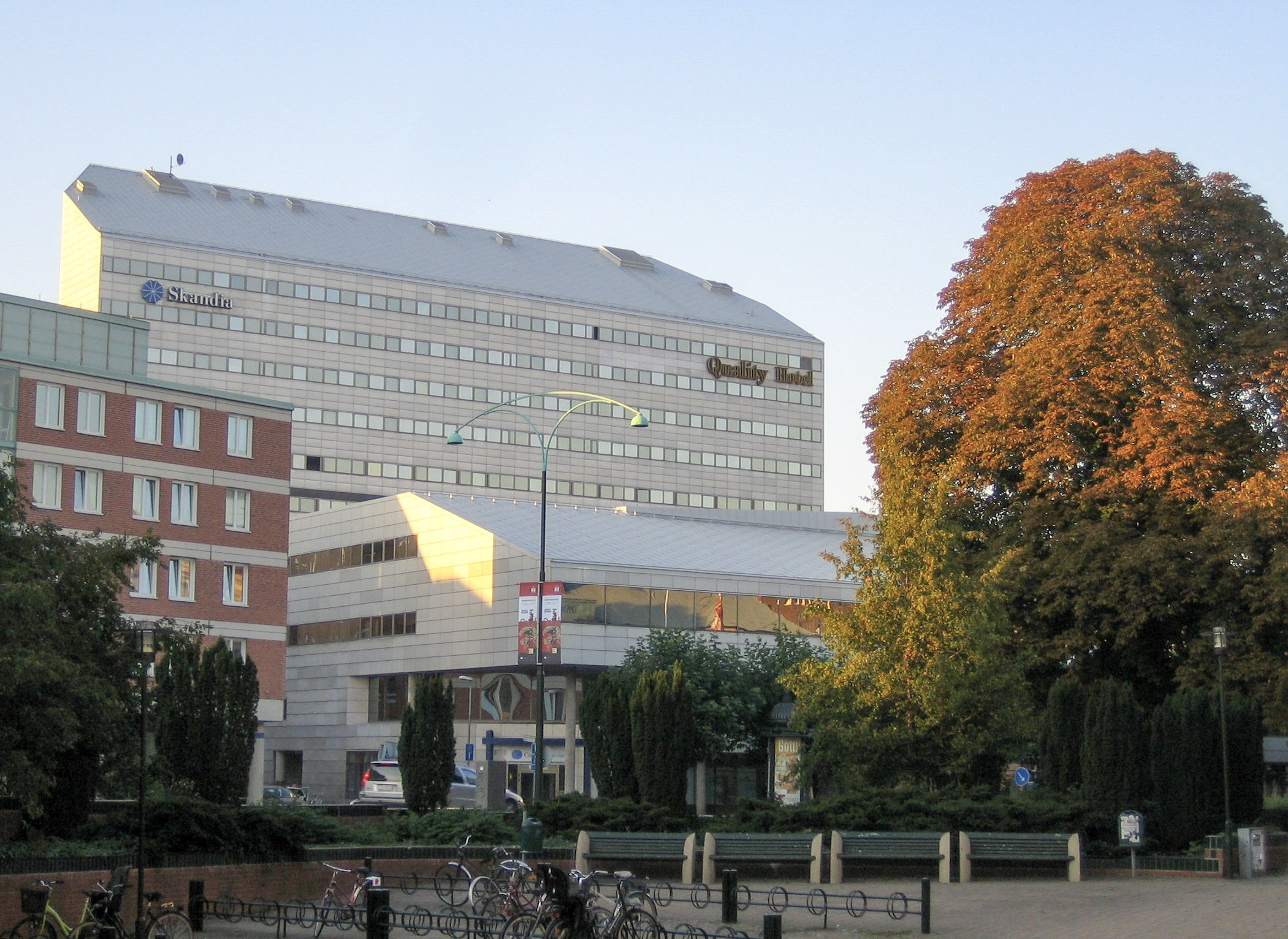
- Malmö Old Concert Hall
- Interactive map of the Malmö Old Concert Hall area

General information
- Location: Föreningsgatan 35
- Inaugurated: 1985
- Renovated: 2017-2018

Technical details
- Floor count: 13
- Floor area: 24,000 m^{2} (260,000 sq ft)

Design and construction
- Architect: Sten Samuelson

Malmö Old Concert Hall is a 1,200-seat concert hall located in Lugnet, a central neighbourhood in Malmö, Sweden that opened in 1985. The architect was Sten Samuelson. Malmö Symphony Orchestra used to be resident at the building. The building was also used for congresses and conferences. Malmö Old Concert Hall was completely renovated in 2017–2018.

== Previous concert venues ==
As early as 1919, the Malmö Concert Hall Foundation had begun working to establish a concert hall in Malmö.

Between 1944 and 1985, orchestra concerts were held at Malmö City Theater, the building now used by Malmö Opera. Before 1944, concerts were held at St. Petri School and at the Palladium cinema.

Even when the concert hall was newly built, there were problems with, among other things, transport elevators that were too small and poor acoustics. It was therefore replaced with a new concert hall.

== New concert hall ==
In the summer of 2015, the Malmö Symphony Orchestra moved to Malmö Live, also located in central Malmö. Malmö Live is a combination of conference center, concert hall, and hotel. Malmö Live Concert Hall can accommodate 1,600 listeners.

== Renovation ==
Malmö Old Concert Hall was completely renovated in 2017–2018 and is now an office building of 11,000 m^{2} (120,000 sq ft) and a hotel containing 225 rooms in 13 stories. The total refurbishment area is 24,000 m^{2} (260,000 sq ft). The building now houses the Swedish Public Employment Service.
