= Södra Sofielund =

Coordinates: 55°35′2.48″N 13°0′48.83″E

- Neighbourhood
- Interactive map of Södra Sofielund
- Country: Sweden
- Province: Skåne
- County: Skåne County
- Municipality: Malmö Municipality
- Borough of Malmö: Södra Innerstaden

Population (1 January 2011)
  - Total: 4,478
- Time zone: UTC+1 (CET)
  - Summer (DST): UTC+2 (CEST)

Södra Sofielund, or Seved, informally, is a neighbourhood of Malmö, situated in the Borough of Södra Innerstaden, Malmö Municipality, Skåne County, Sweden. The neighbourhood has a high number of preserved buildings from its origins as a working class district from the end of the 19th century. Södra (or South) Sofielund is a one half of the older Sofielund region (which was in turn a partition of Sofielundsgården) that was split into North and South by the Malmö–Ystad railway line in 1874. From this period to the early 20th century, the area was known for its poverty, overcrowding and poor sanitation, but also for its meat products, leading to an early nickname, "Swine-land". Södra Sofielund would be incorporated into the city of Malmö in 1911.

The area consists mainly of worker's housing from the late 19th to early 20th century, as well as apartment buildings from the 1930s onwards. Many buildings, in particular apartments, were designed between the 1920s to 1960s by the architect Axel Carlsson, who would run one of the most productive architectural offices in Malmö of the post-war period. The amount of historic, working-class buildings that have been preserved is unique compared similar regions that had demolished their older buildings between the 1960s-70s.

In 2015, the area was reported by daily newspaper Sydsvenskan to be a socially deprived area where drugs were sold openly and heavy violence involving the use of hand grenades and assault rifles occurred. In its December 2015 report, the Swedish Police Authority placed the district in the most severe category of urban areas with high crime rates. However, in 2025 (and retroactively for 2023), NOA's biennial report lowered its classification to the least severe category, "Vulnerable Area" after several years of positive development.
