= Sten Samuelson =

Swedish architect

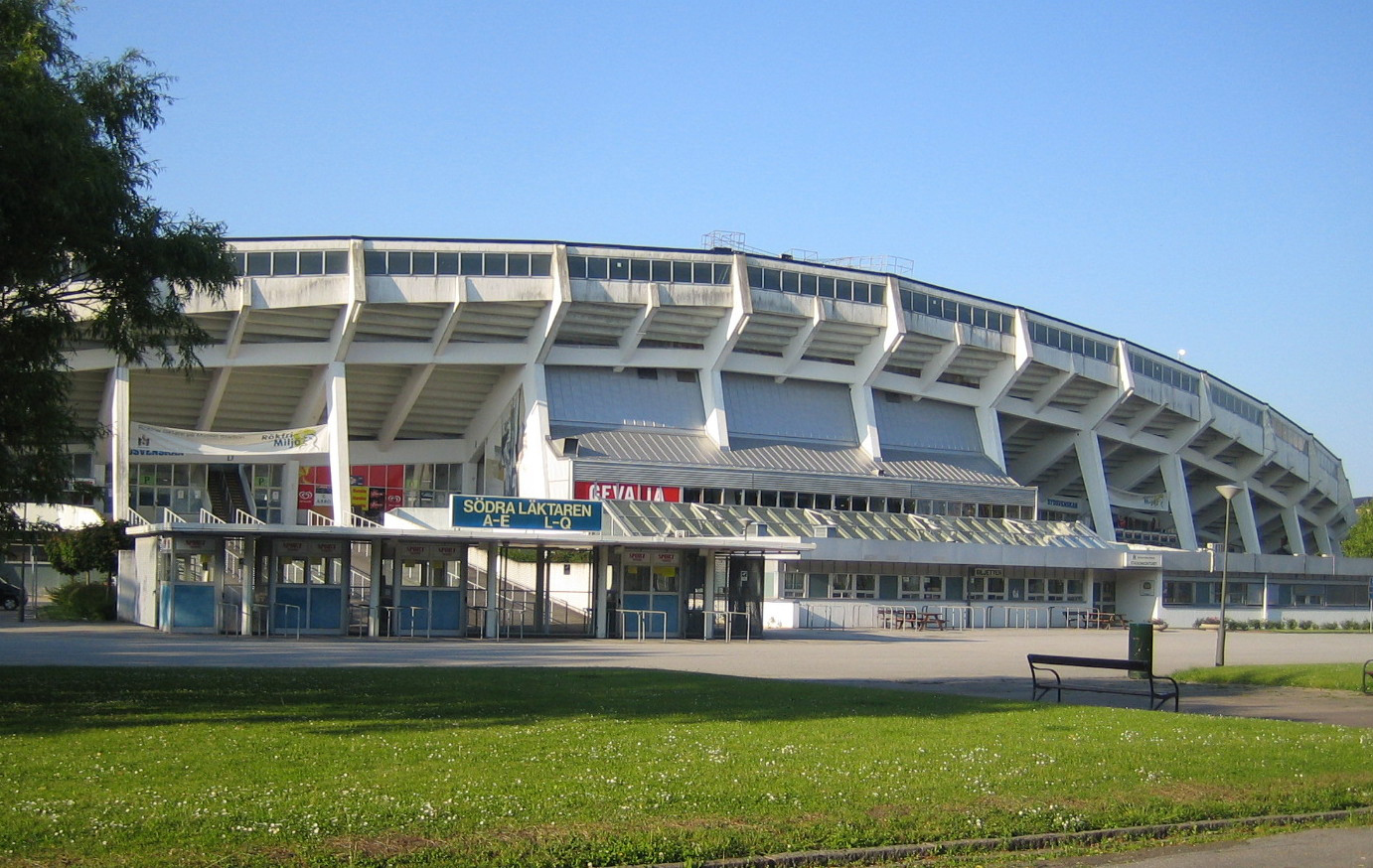
Malmö Stadion in Malmö

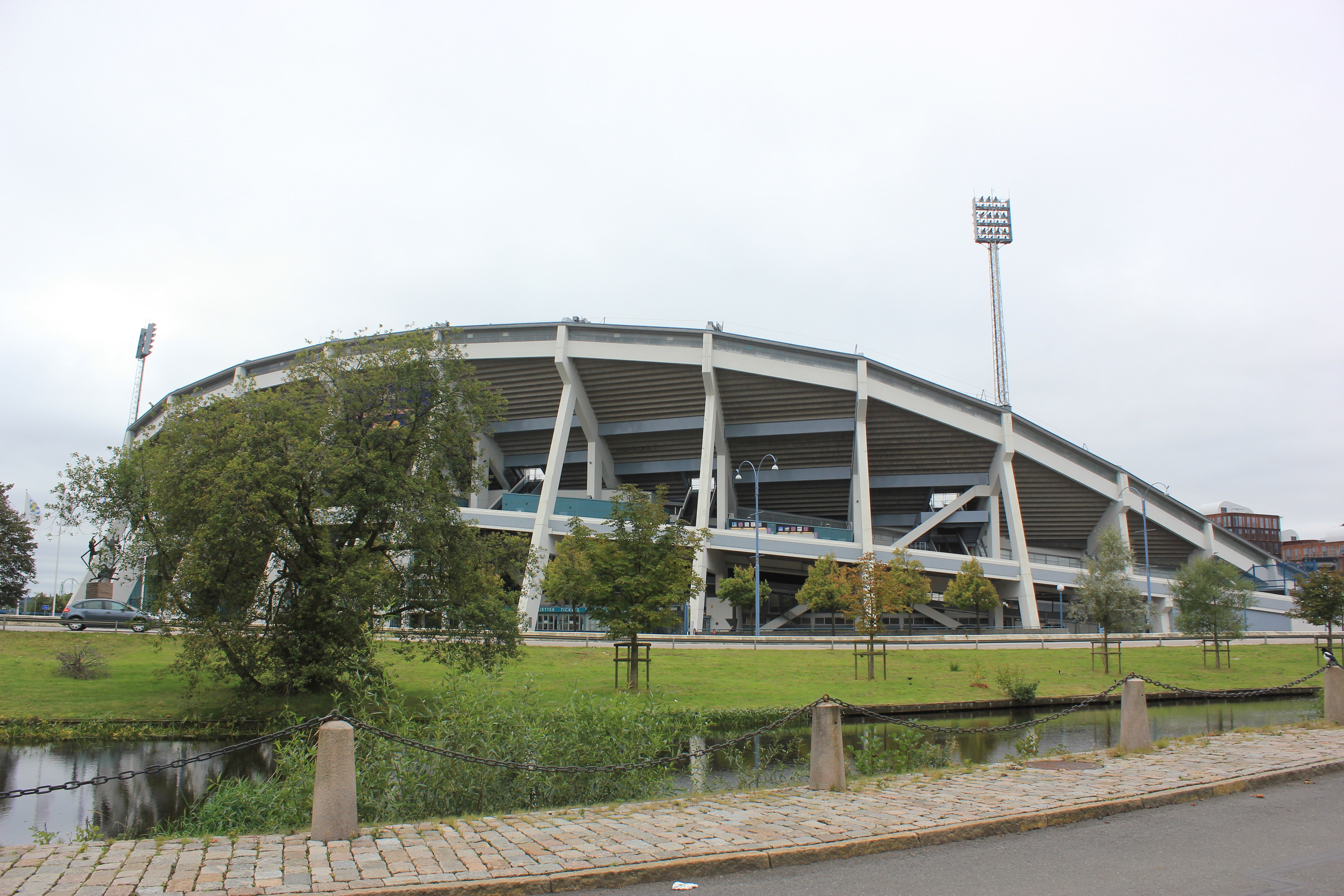
Ullevi in Gothenburg,

Sten Samuelson (30 April 1926 in Ängelholm, Skåne County, Sweden – 4 July 2002 in Montreux, Switzerland) was a Swedish architect.

== Biography ==
Samuelson studied architecture at KTH Royal Institute of Technology in Stockholm. He was professor at Lund University of Technology from 1964–1983. Together with architect Fritz Jaenecke (1903-1978), Sten Samuelson started a joint office in 1950. Samuelson worked with Jaenecke & Samuelson until 1970. Together they came to draw several well-known public buildings in the 1950s and 1960s. Jaenecke & Samuelson designed the Malmö Stadion in Malmö and Ullevi, the multi-purpose stadium in Gothenburg, which were constructed for the 1958 FIFA World Cup.

Later designed included the Novotel Warszawa Centrum in Warsaw from 1974 and Malmö Concert Hall from 1985.
