= Södervärnstornet =

Water tower in Malmö, Sweden

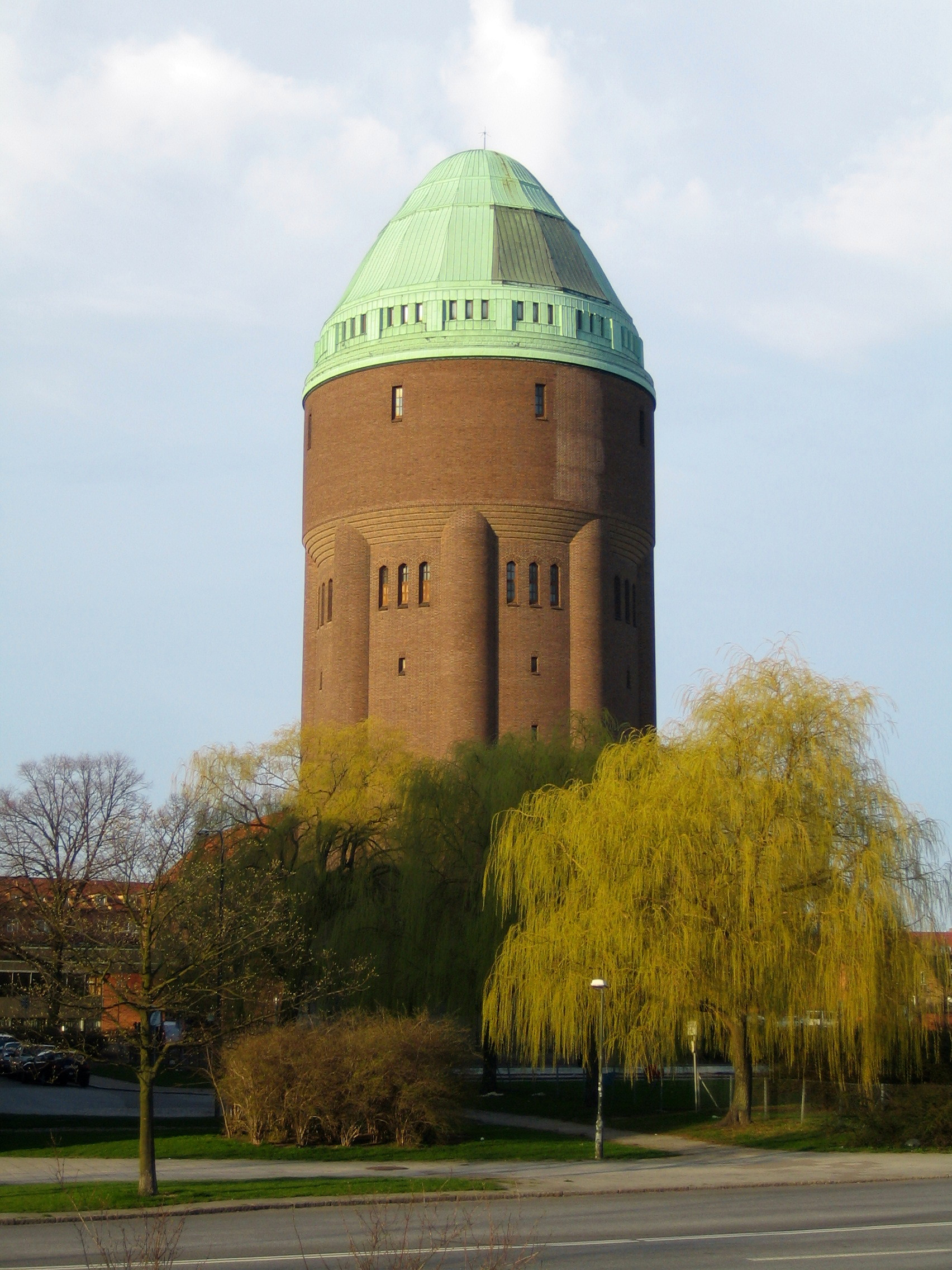
- Södervärnstornet in 2006
- Interactive map of the Södervärnstornet area

General information
- Coordinates: 55°35′17″N 13°00′42″E
- Completed: 1916
- Opened: March 1916
- Owner: Malmö Municipality

Technical details
- Material: Brick (facade); Copper (roof and detailing)

Design and construction
- Architect: Salomon Sörensen

Södervärnstornet is a building in Malmö, Sweden, which was originally built in 1916 to serve as a water tower. The tower is located in the Möllevången neighbourhood where Nobelvägen and Spårvagnsgatan intersect. The building was designed by city architect Salomon Sörensen.

Many residents of Malmö use the nickname Kuken, 'The Cock', for the tower, owing to its perceived phallic shape.

== History ==
Planning for the tower began in 1913, as the existing water towers in Pildammarna and Kirseberg were becoming insufficient for the growing city. Connection to the Malmö water network was performed in March 1916. The tower continued to function as a water reservoir until 2015, when local water authority VA Syd deemed it impractical to perform the necessary renovations. On 1 July 2018, both Södervärnstornet and the Pildammarna water tower were acquired by Malmö Municipality for a symbolic sum of 1 krona.

Renovations to the copper roof were performed in 2022–2023, with the roof regaining its original copper colour.

Malmö Municipality originally planned to sell the tower to private interests, with one plan being to build apartments inside the tower. These plans were put on hold in July 2023, with the city wishing to give the local community the task of finding a new, public use for the tower.

=== Vandalism ===
In April 1983, the roof of the tower was undergoing repairs, and scaffolding had been erected. A vandal used this scaffolding to climb the tower, spray painting the words "Mörda Bilar Hata Data" ('Murder Cars Hate Data') on the buildings side.
