= Rörsjöstaden =

- Neighbourhood
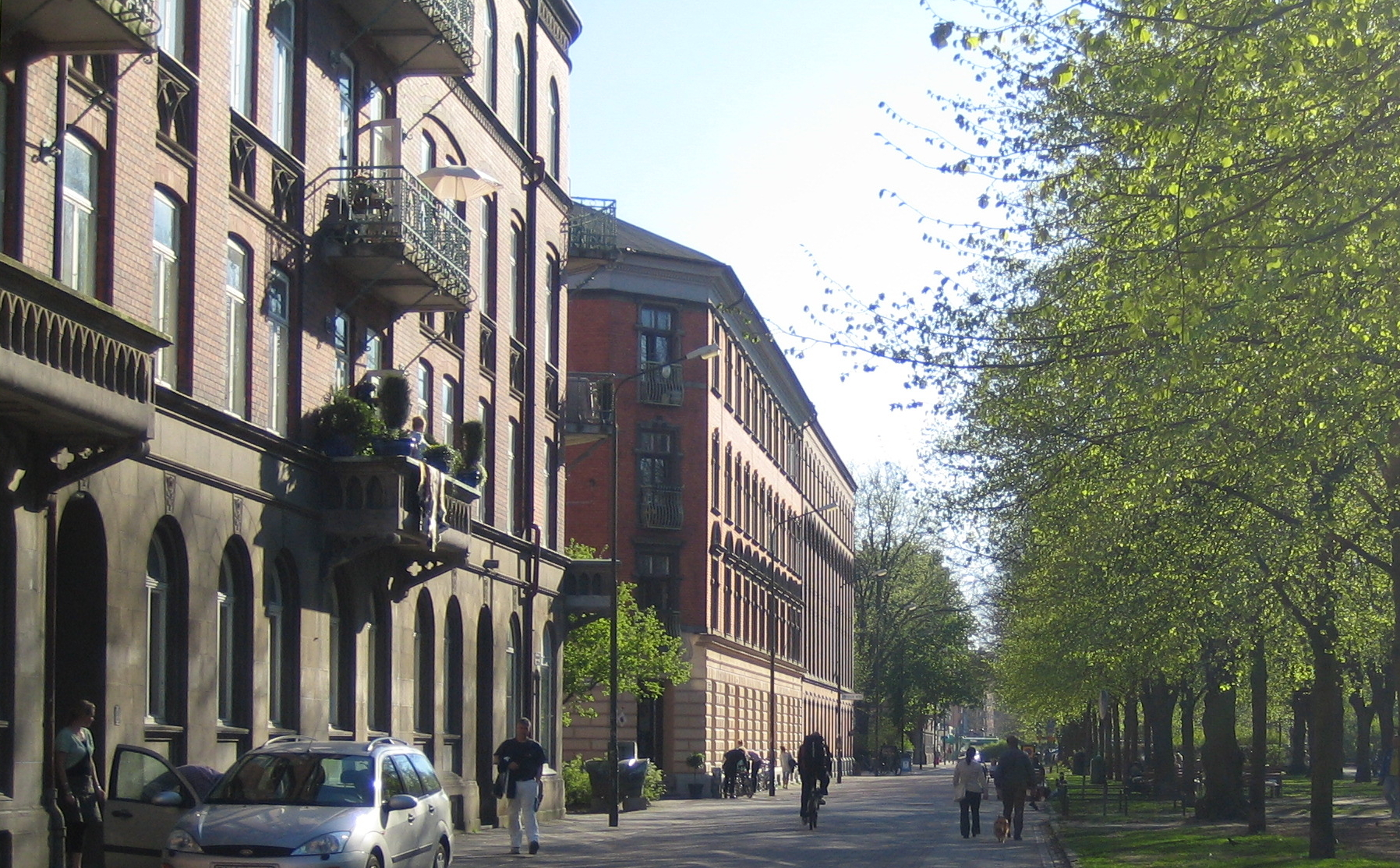
- Interactive map of Rörsjöstaden
- Coordinates: 55°36′12″N 13°00′55″E
- Country: Sweden
- Province: Skåne
- County: Skåne County
- Municipality: Malmö Municipality
- Borough of Malmö: Centrum

Population (1 January 2011)
  - Total: 4,510
- Time zone: UTC+1 (CET)
  - Summer (DST): UTC+2 (CEST)

Rörsjöstaden (Reed Lake Town) is a neighbourhood of Malmö, situated in the Borough of Centrum, Malmö Municipality, Skåne County, Sweden. Värnhemstorget as well as St. Paul's Church are located in Rörsjöstaden.
