= Ellstorp =

Neighbourhood of Malmö, Sweden

- Neighbourhood
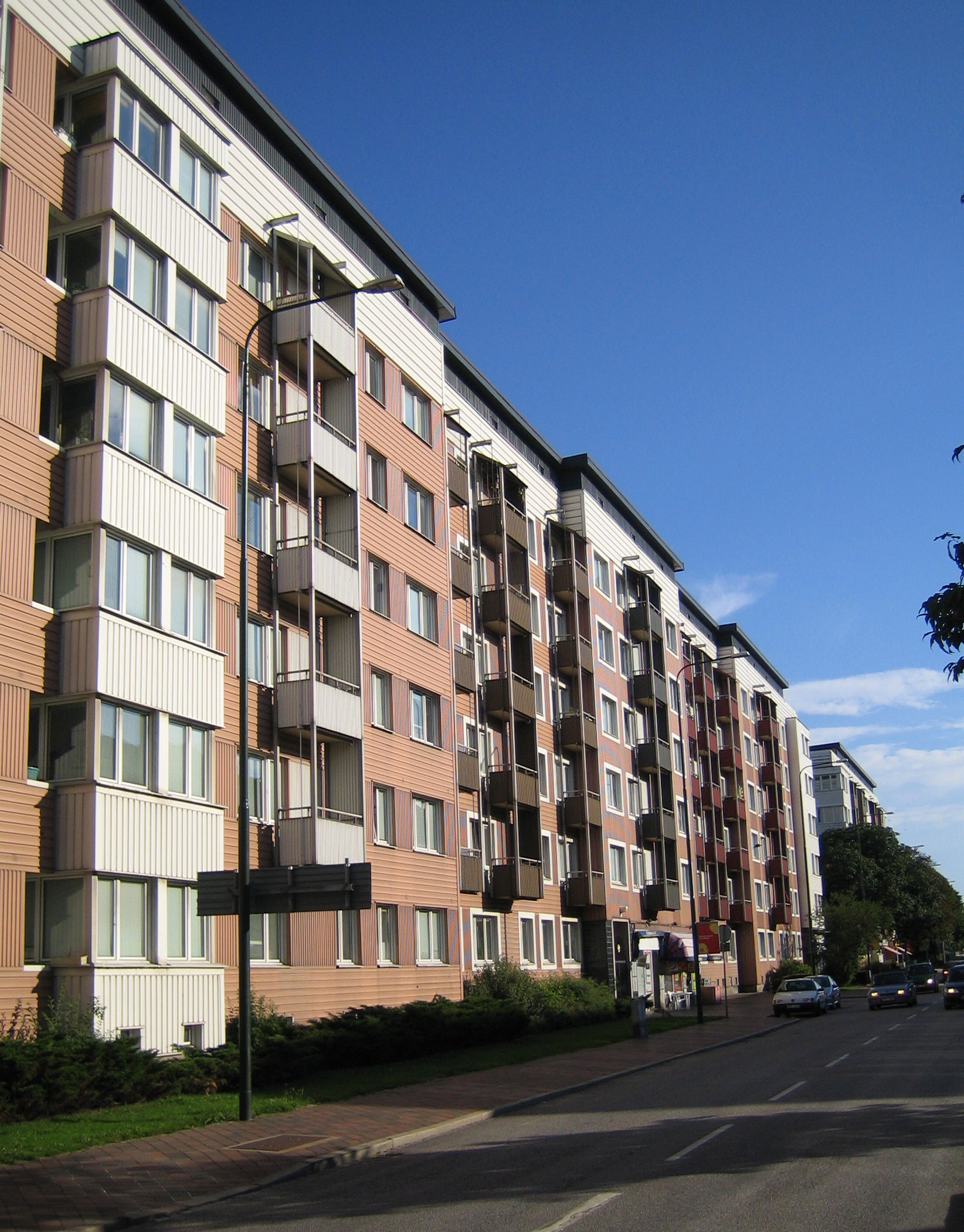
- Interactive map of Ellstorp
- Coordinates: 55°36′13″N 13°01′50″E
- Country: Sweden
- Province: Skåne
- County: Skåne County
- Municipality: Malmö Municipality
- Borough of Malmö: Centrum

Population (1 January 2011)
  - Total: 1,656
- Time zone: UTC+1 (CET)
  - Summer (DST): UTC+2 (CEST)

Ellstorp is a neighbourhood of Malmö, situated in the Borough of Centrum, Malmö Municipality, Skåne County, Sweden.
