= St. Paul's Church, Malmö =

19th-century church in Malmö, Sweden

St. Paul's Church
- S:t Pauli kyrka
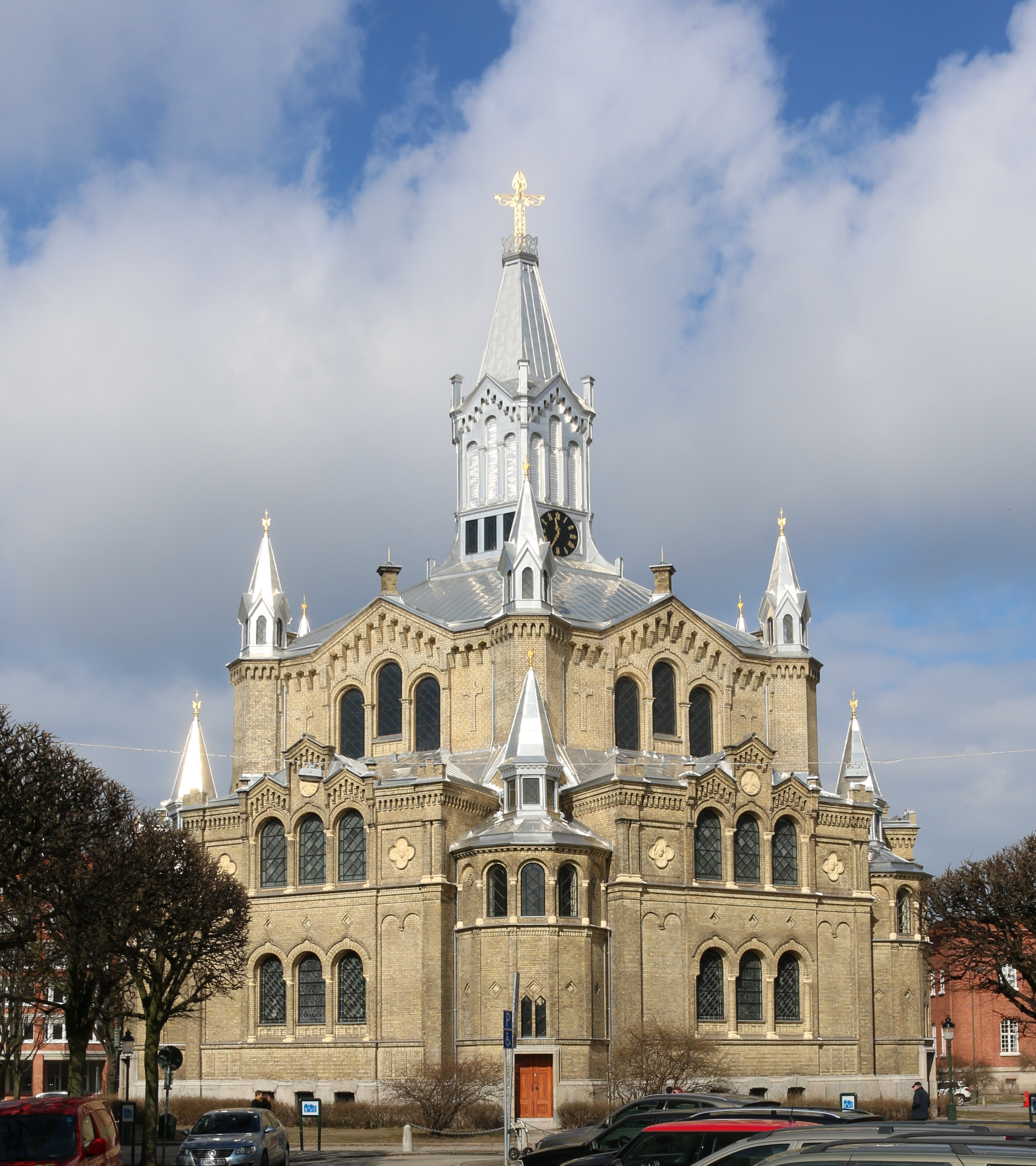
- St. Paul's Church, March 2015
- St. Paul's Church
- 55°36′11″N 13°00′52″E
- Location: Rörsjöstaden, Malmö
- Country: Sweden
- Denomination: Lutheran, Church of Sweden
- Website: svenskakyrkan.se/malmo/sanktpaulikyrka

Architecture
- Architect: Emil Victor Langlet
- Years built: 1880-1882

Administration
- Diocese: Diocese of Lund
- Parish: St. John's Parish

Clergy
- Priest(s): Anders Friberg; Hanna Malmqvist; Karin Pråmell

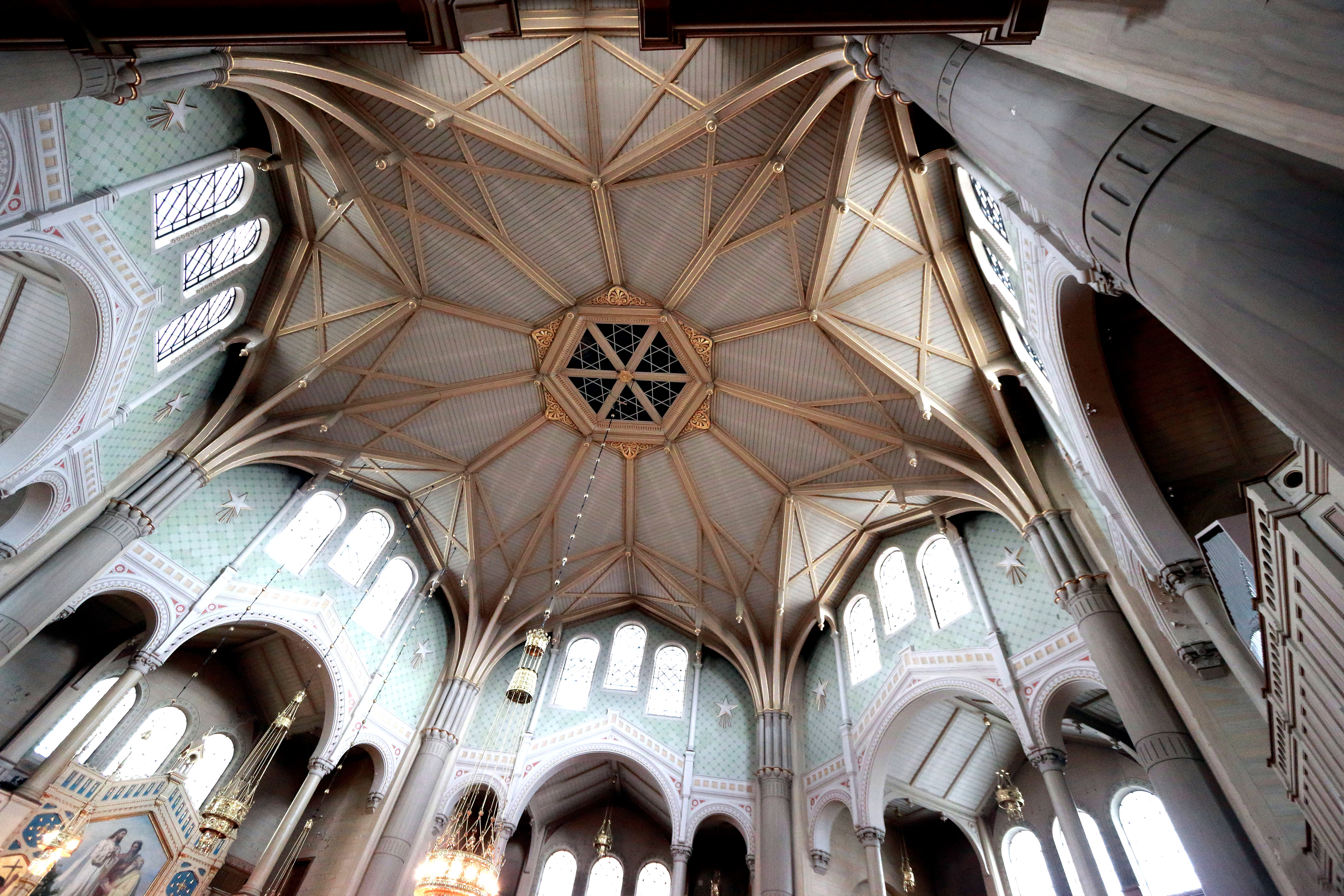
The church's hexagonal shape visible in its ceiling.

St. Paul's Church (Swedish: S:t Pauli kyrka) is a church located in the Rörsjöstaden neighbourhood of Malmö, Sweden.

St. Paul's Church is a church building in Malmö in the diocese of Lund. Since 2014, it has been the parish church in Malmö S:t Johannes parish. The church is hexagonal and of yellow brick. It was designed by Emil Viktor Langlet. Construction began in 1879 by building contractor Mortensen, Malmö, and was completed in 1882. The inside was richly decorated and the church is equipped with a central tower, surrounded by 12 turrets. The church interior is spacious. A baptistery and devotional chapel have been installed under two of the five stands. The church's stained glass windows were added in the 1950s. Southeast of the church are Sankt Pauli's northern, middle and southern cemeteries.

== History ==
St. Paul's Church is located at the intersection of Kungsgatan and Sankt Pauli kyrkogata in Malmö. Previously, Sankt Petri church had been the main church, but as more and more people moved to Malmö, it became too small and another one was needed. The architect Emil Viktor Langlet made the drawings for the church, which was completed on November 26, 1882, and the congregation was formed in 1884. The church was built in the middle of the new Rörsjöstaden district.

St. Paul's church has a hexagonal shape, inspired by older, fourth century AD, church buildings. Furthermore, the plot on which the church is located is also hexagonal. The idea behind the hexagonal church was that everyone would see and hear properly. Also, it was ordered together with the Caroli Church, also designed by Langlet, in a hexagonal shape. It was cheaper to build two similar churches together. In addition, they wanted to increase equality among the members of the congregation by bringing everyone closer to the priest. In a cruciform church, the more privileged members would always sit at the front.

According to Christian tradition, the churches were to be built on a well or stream from which the baptismal water was to be taken. Saint Paul's Church was thus built in the middle of what was once Lake Rörsjön. The church was built on large piles, but because it is built on a lake, it sinks a few centimeters every year. Furthermore, they were forced to place the cemetery some distance from the church because they were afraid of diseases.

== The church building ==
The church is built of yellow brick from Lomma brickworks at a cost of SEK 244,108, including furnishings. The church has a main tower that symbolizes Jesus and twelve turrets symbolizing his Disciples. At the top of the main tower is a golden cross with a wreath reminding of the flame of the Holy Spirit and the first day of Pentecost.

A large structure, constructed of wooden beams, holds up the three bronze bells and the central main tower of the church. There is a large, a medium and a small bell which ring for ten minutes at eleven o'clock twice a week for those who have died within the parish. In addition, they ring at Sunday services at half past ten and three minutes to eleven. The church currently holds about 950 people, as only one of the stands can be used, but there is actually room for about 1200 people.

The original roof of the church was made of copper and was originally painted grey. A repaint in green created the misconception that the copper had acquired a green patina. In 2013, the roof was redone, now in aluminum, whose shiny silver color is expected to fade to a gray color similar to the original color. The San Gioacchino church in Rome was used as a model for using the unusual material of aluminum for churches.

== Furnishings ==
The altarpiece is painted by Mårten Eskil Winge and depicts the Declaration of Christ in the center, John the Baptist on the left and the Apostle Paul on the right. When the church was planned, there were only two churches in Malmö, St Peter's and the old Caroli church. These were named after apostles, so St Paul's was also named after an apostle. The church is illuminated by Art Nouveau lamps from around 1920. The church has a communion jug, donated by King Oscar II. In the chancel is a carpet composed by textile artist Märta Måås-Fjetterström and made by members of the church's sewing association. For a week at the end of 2019, a painting with LGBTQ motifs by the artist Elisabeth Ohlson Wallin hung on the border of the chancel, referred to by the artist and the painting's supporters as the "altarpiece". It was theologically criticized as a Gnostic reinterpretation of the creation story and was shortly afterwards taken down.

The church has two side chapels used for worship, baptisms and other gatherings. The side chapel windows are painted by Ralph Bergholtz and depict various Bible stories, scenes from the Acts of the Apostles to be more precise. They were painted in the 1950s. In the right side chapel there is also a memorial plaque with the names of the parishioners who died at sea during the Second World War. The plaque was made by a man who was the brother of one of those who died. He then donated this plaque to the parish. Around the whole church there is a painted curtain on the wall. It is there as a reminder of the curtain that was around the stone tablets of Moses that the Israelites carried during their desert wanderings for forty years. A little higher up on the walls are painted stars symbolizing Christ. There used to be Bible quotes under the stars, but these were painted over in the 1950s.

The church last underwent an almost two-year long renovation before reopening in March 2017.

== Organ ==
- The church's first organ was built in 1882 by Anders Victor Lundahl of Malmö and had 22 stops. As one of the tenders invited in 1881, Lundahl offered to install his organ free of charge in return for the city paying for the exterior work, such as the facade, which would cost 5,000 SEK. The offer was accepted in January 1882 as the cheapest but also because Lundahl had many years of proven experience as an organ builder.
- In 1911, Åkerman & Lund of Sundbyberg built an organ with 26 stops.
- The current organ was built in 1967 by A. Mårtenssons Orgelfabrik AB, Lund and the organ has mechanical action and electrical registration. The organ has free and fixed combinations.
- Choir organ. The current choir organ was built in 1970 by E A Setterquist & Son, Strängnäs and is a mechanical organ.
