= Mellersta hamnen =

Coordinates: 55°37′17″N 13°0′37″E

- Neighbourhood
- Interactive map of Mellersta hamnen
- Country: Sweden
- Province: Skåne
- County: Skåne County
- Municipality: Malmö Municipality
- Borough of Malmö: Centrum

Population (1 January 2011)
  - Total: 9
- Time zone: UTC+1 (CET)
  - Summer (DST): UTC+2 (CEST)

Mellersta hamnen is a neighbourhood of Malmö, situated in the Borough of Centrum, Malmö Municipality, Skåne County, Sweden.
