= Norra Sorgenfri =

Coordinates: 55.60°N 13.03°E

- Neighbourhood
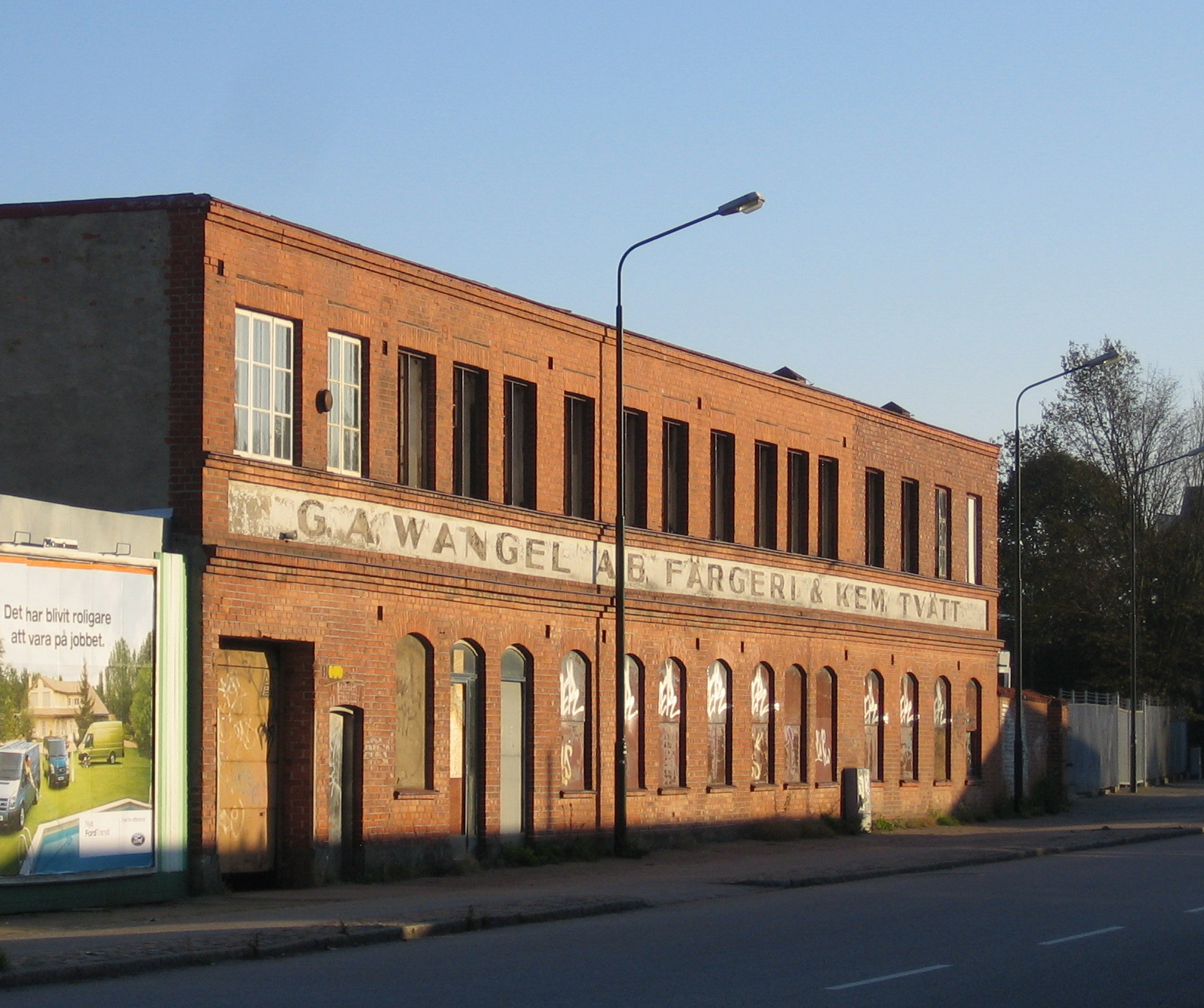
- Sorgenfri industrial area, Malmö, Sweden
- Interactive map of Norra Sorgenfri
- Country: Sweden
- Province: Skåne
- County: Skåne County
- Municipality: Malmö Municipality
- Borough of Malmö: Centrum
- Time zone: UTC+1 (CET)
  - Summer (DST): UTC+2 (CEST)

Norra Sorgenfri, formerly Sorgenfri industriområde, is a neighbourhood of Malmö, Sweden. It is situated in the borough of Norr.

From 2014 to 2015, when Norra Sorgenfri was essentially an industrial area, the area was taken over by squatters, with people living in trailers, huts and tents. Its residents received a notification of expulsion from local authorities in November 2015.
