= Katrinelund =

Neighbourhood of Malmö Municipality, Sweden

- Neighbourhood
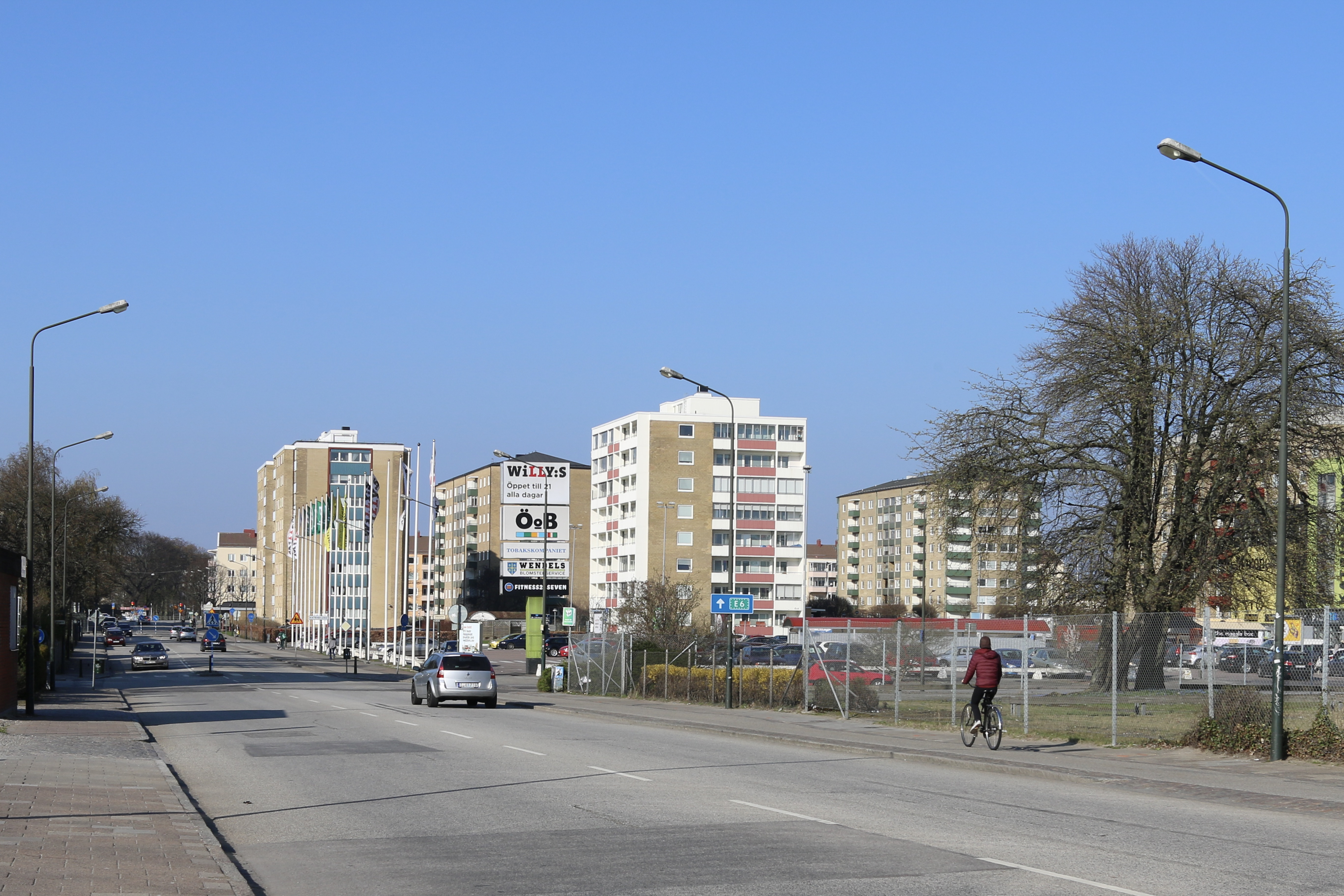
- Katrinelund
- Interactive map of Katrinelund
- Coordinates: 55°36′03″N 13°02′02″E
- Country: Sweden
- Province: Skåne
- County: Skåne County
- Municipality: Malmö Municipality
- Borough of Malmö: Centrum

Population (2021)
  - Total: 2,127
- Time zone: UTC+1 (CET)
  - Summer (DST): UTC+2 (CEST)

Katrinelund is a neighbourhood of Malmö, situated in the Borough of Centrum, Malmö Municipality, Skåne County, Sweden.

Katrinelund was formerly the location of Värnhem hospital, which was closed in 2002. The former hospital buildings now house a primary school along with several student apartment complexes and dormitories owned by the municipally owned real estate company MKB and Rikshem.
