= Malmöhus =

- Neighbourhood
- Interactive map of Malmöhus
- Coordinates: 55.60474°N 12.98759°E
- Country: Sweden
- Province: Scania
- County: Scania
- Municipality: Malmö Municipality
- Borough of Malmö: Centrum

Population (1 January 2011)
  - Total: 1
- Time zone: UTC+1 (CET)
  - Summer (DST): UTC+2 (CEST)

Malmöhus is a neighbourhood of Malmö, situated in the borough of Centrum, Malmö Municipality, Scania County (formerly Malmöhus County), Sweden. It is named after the castle that is located there.
