= Flensburg, Malmö =

Neighbourhood of Malmö, Sweden

Flensburg
- Neighbourhood
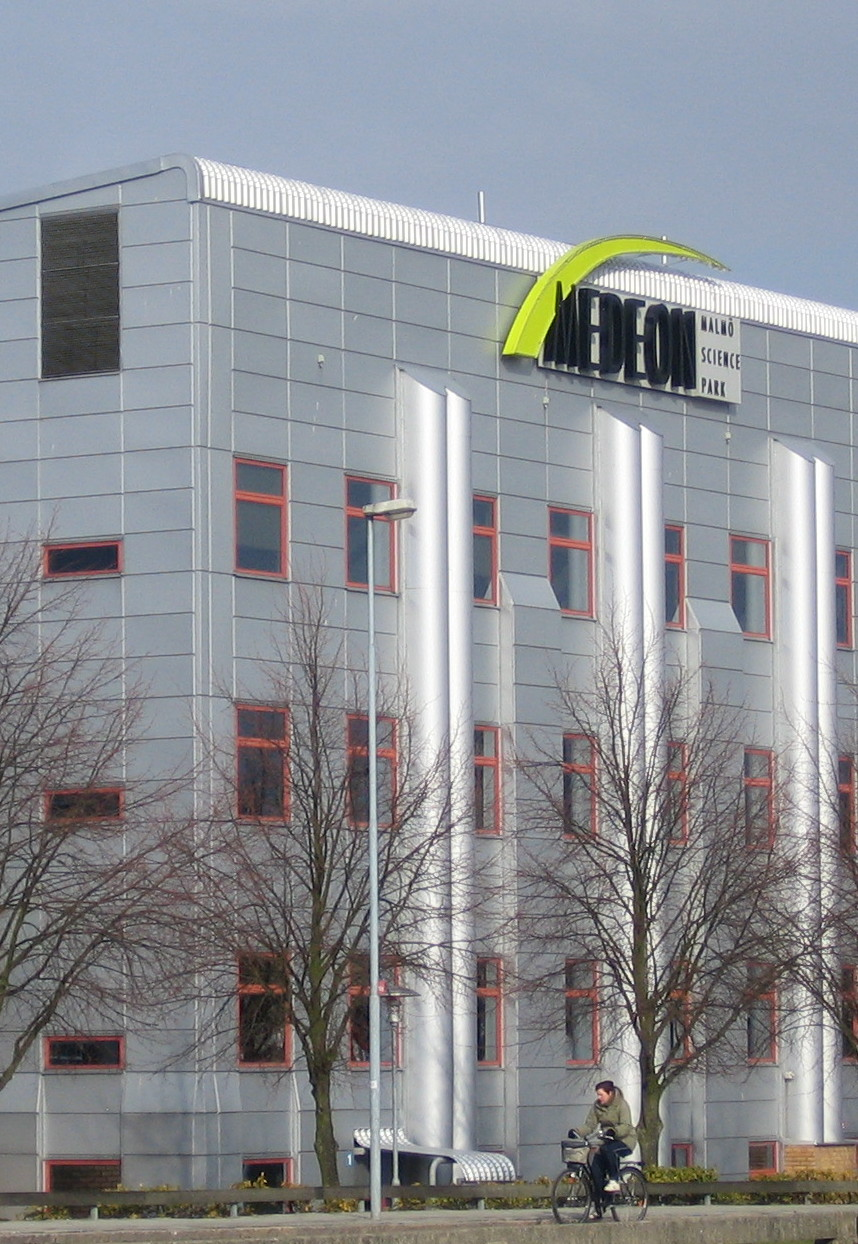
- Interactive map of Flensburg
- Coordinates: 55°34′56″N 13°00′08″E
- Country: Sweden
- Province: Skåne
- County: Skåne County
- Municipality: Malmö Municipality
- Borough of Malmö: Södra Innerstaden

Population (1 January 2011)
  - Total: 788
- Time zone: UTC+1 (CET)
  - Summer (DST): UTC+2 (CEST)

Flensburg is a neighbourhood of Malmö, situated in the Borough of Södra Innerstaden, Malmö Municipality, Skåne County, Sweden. As of 2008, it had 669 inhabitants and covers an area of 19 hectares. As of 2011, it was home to 788 residents, serving as a small but integrated part of the city's urban landscape. One of the area's most notable landmarks is the Medeon Science Park, a significant research hub dedicated to life sciences and health-related enterprises. Despite its small size, the neighborhood's location within Malmö Municipality places it in a dynamic region of Skåne County, characterized by a blend of residential life and professional innovation.
