= Slussen, Malmö =

Slussen
- Neighbourhood
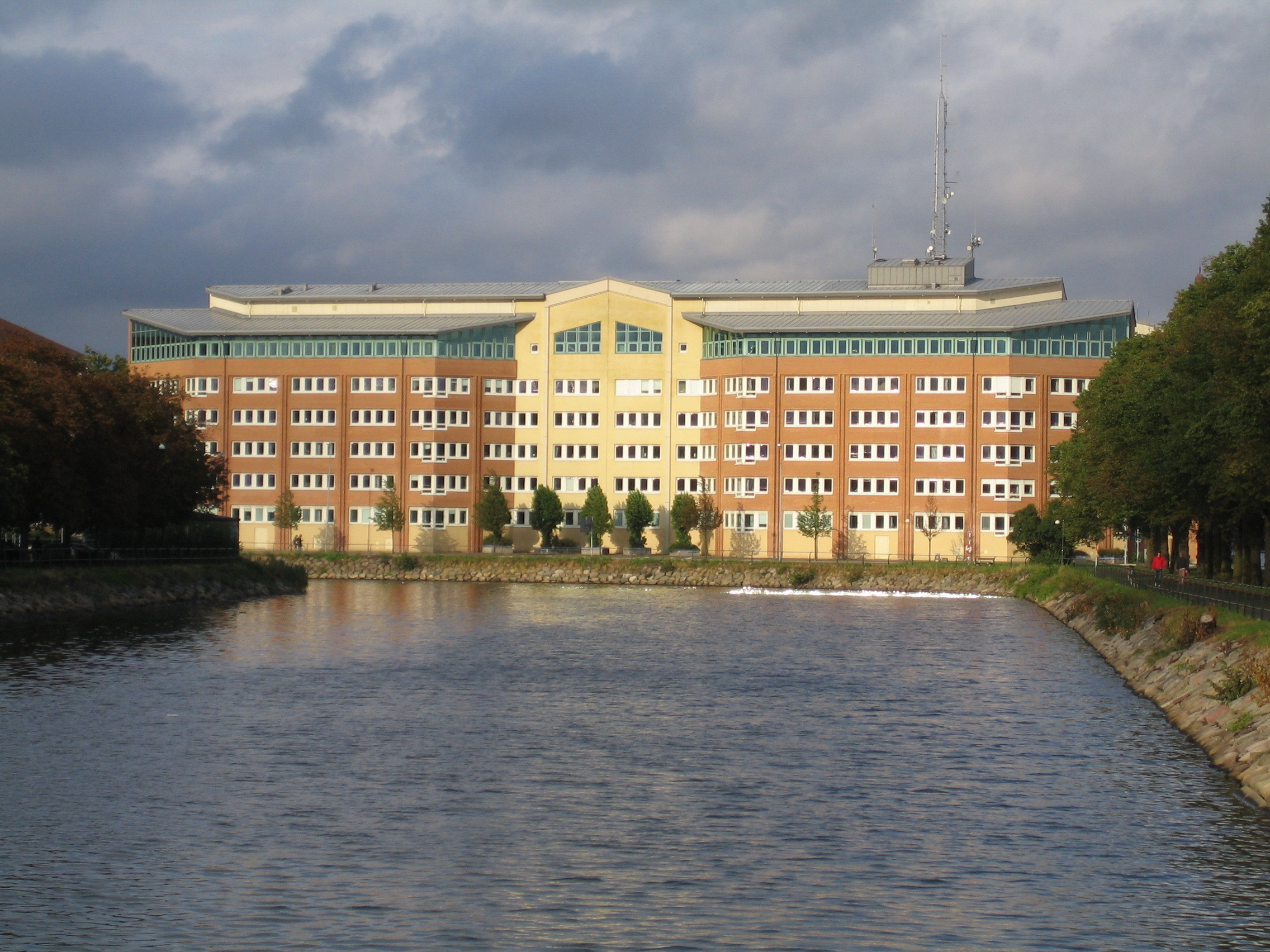
- Interactive map of Slussen
- Coordinates: 55°36′27″N 13°01′02″E
- Country: Sweden
- Province: Skåne
- County: Skåne County
- Municipality: Malmö Municipality
- Borough of Malmö: Centrum

Population (1 January 2011)
  - Total: 2,706
- Time zone: UTC+1 (CET)
  - Summer (DST): UTC+2 (CEST)

Slussen is a neighbourhood of Malmö, situated in the Borough of Centrum, Malmö Municipality, Skåne County, Sweden.

Slussen forms part of Östra Förstaden. The area developed from the late 18th century, when simple houses were built along Malmö's eastern approach road, with further expansion during the 19th century. A canal connected to Sege River was dug alongside the railway in the 1850s and filled in around 1910.

The name Slussen ("the lock") comes from the lock that once connected the canal to the harbour canal. In 1937, a bus station was built at Slussplan; it has since been replaced by a residential building and a small park.
