= Möllevången =

Neighbourhood of Malmö, Sweden

- Neighbourhood
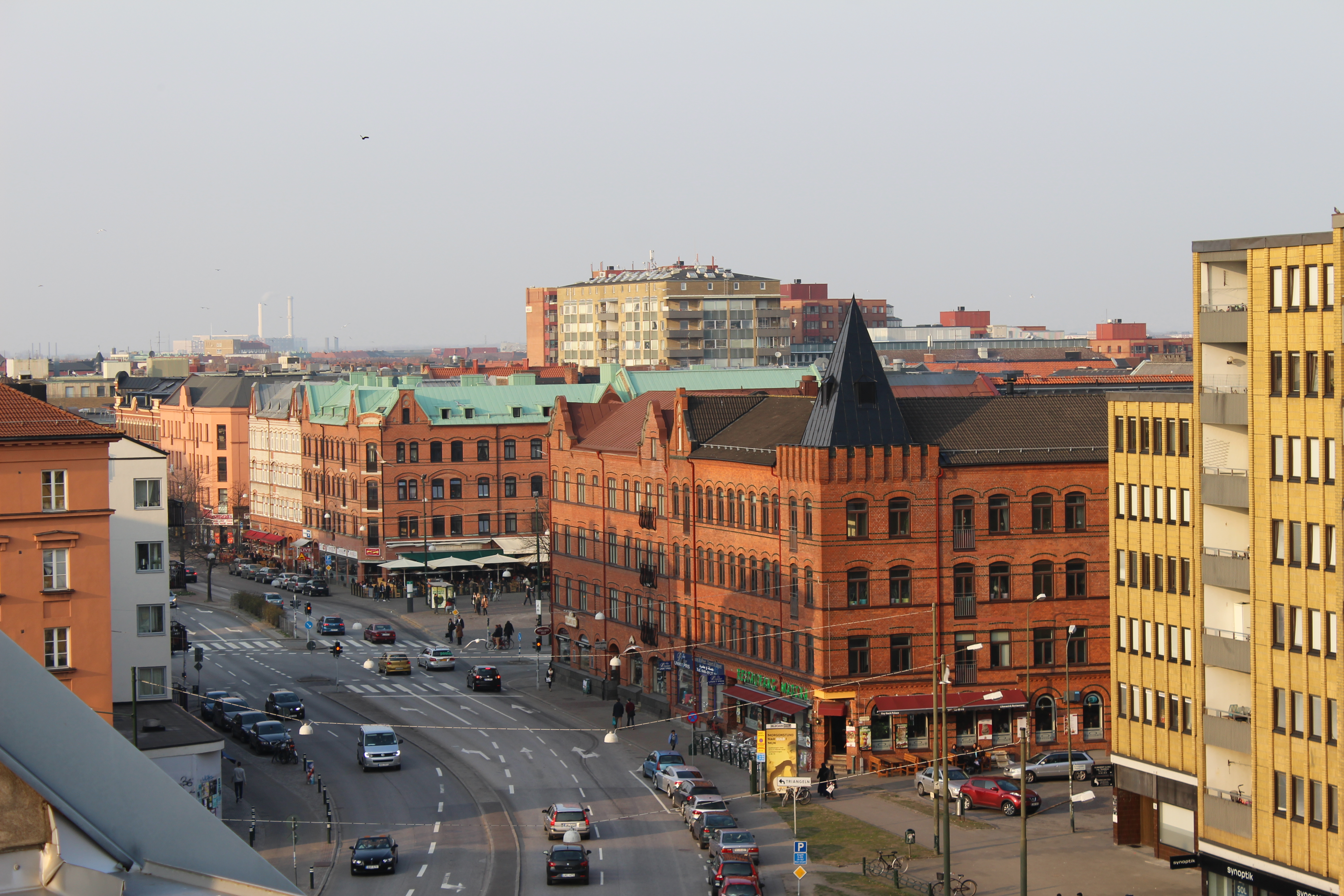
- Southwestern Möllevången.
- Interactive map of Möllevången
- Coordinates: 55°35′32″N 13°00′35″E
- Country: Sweden
- Province: Skåne
- County: Skåne County
- Municipality: Malmö Municipality
- Borough of Malmö: Södra Innerstaden

Population (2023)
  - Total: 10,904
- Time zone: UTC+1 (CET)
  - Summer (DST): UTC+2 (CEST)

Möllevången, also called Möllan, is a neighbourhood of Malmö, situated in the Borough of Södra Innerstaden, Malmö Municipality, Skåne County, Sweden. It covers an area of 53 hectares (0.20 sq mi), bordered by five streets: Bergsgatan, Amiralsgatan, Nobelvägen and Spårvägsgatan/Södra Förstadsgatan. As of 2023, 10,904 inhabitants resided in the neighbourhood, or approximately 3% of Malmö's inhabitants. The neighbourhood experienced a significant population recovery from the 7,575 low in 1981, however it is still below the 13,590 inhabitants in 1961.

A square (Möllevångstorget), a park (Folkets Park), Södervärnstornet and many restaurants and shops are located in the neighbourhood. Möllevångstorget is home to the most lively market in Malmö, and is also a common site for political demonstrations, particularly from the political left. The neighbourhood has an urban character, with 96% of properties being in apartment buildings or other types of collective housing, as of 2023. 69% of properties are leaseholds, while 31% are a part of a housing association (Bostadsrätt).

Möllevången is generally seen as a culturally and ethnically diverse neighbourhood, as well as being seen as having a 'left-wing' character. This characterisation and image is, according to researcher Christina Hansen, also one actively disseminated and encouraged by left-wing activists in the area. The area is also seen by some as a particularly unsafe area in what some consider an already unsafe city, notably being used as the backdrop to illustrate 'uncertainty' and social exclusion in an advertisement by the nearby municipality of Staffanstorp.

== History ==
=== Early history ===
In the 16th century, Möllevången was known as Österwången and used as farmland since at least the 16th century, with tobacco and rapeseed cultivation prominent in the late 18th and early 19th centuries. Parts of the area were also used for grazing, with the land divided into twelve plots until the late 1800s.

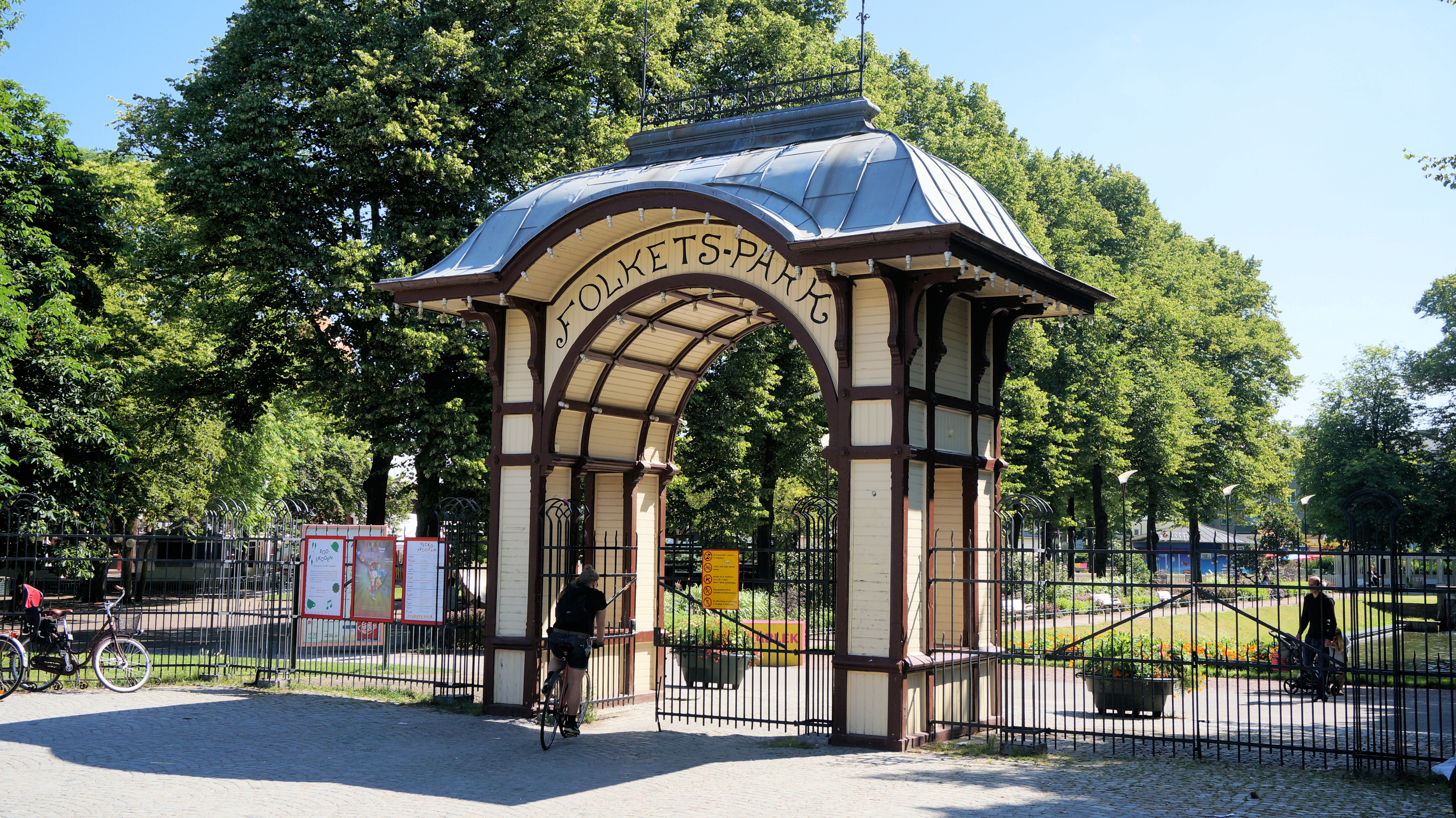
Folkets Park's entrance

In 1796, Frans Suell and his wife, Anna Cajsa af Trolle, established a summer residence in the area, which still stands opposite Folkets Park’s oldest entrance. Between 1806 and 1807, they created Möllevångsparken, a public English-style park with winding paths, edible chestnuts, and scenic features such as waterfalls. This park became Malmö’s first public green space, accessible to all residents.

A small station community arose by the Södervärn station of the Malmö-Ystad railway, built in 1874. Only some small street houses with front gardens remain from this period on the south side of Fricksgatan.

=== Industrialisation and the labour movement ===
The late 19th century saw Malmö's population grow rapidly due to industrialisation, prompting a need for new residential areas. Möllevången was planned as a working-class neighbourhood in the early 1900s, with the first city plan developed by city engineer Anders Nilsson in 1903. Factories and industries such as the Ryska gummifabriken (the Russian Rubber Factory), Fabriks AB Skandinavien, Stenbockens bryggeri (Stenbocken's brewery), Scania AB and Mazetti provided employment for local residents, while Folkets Park became a center for community life.

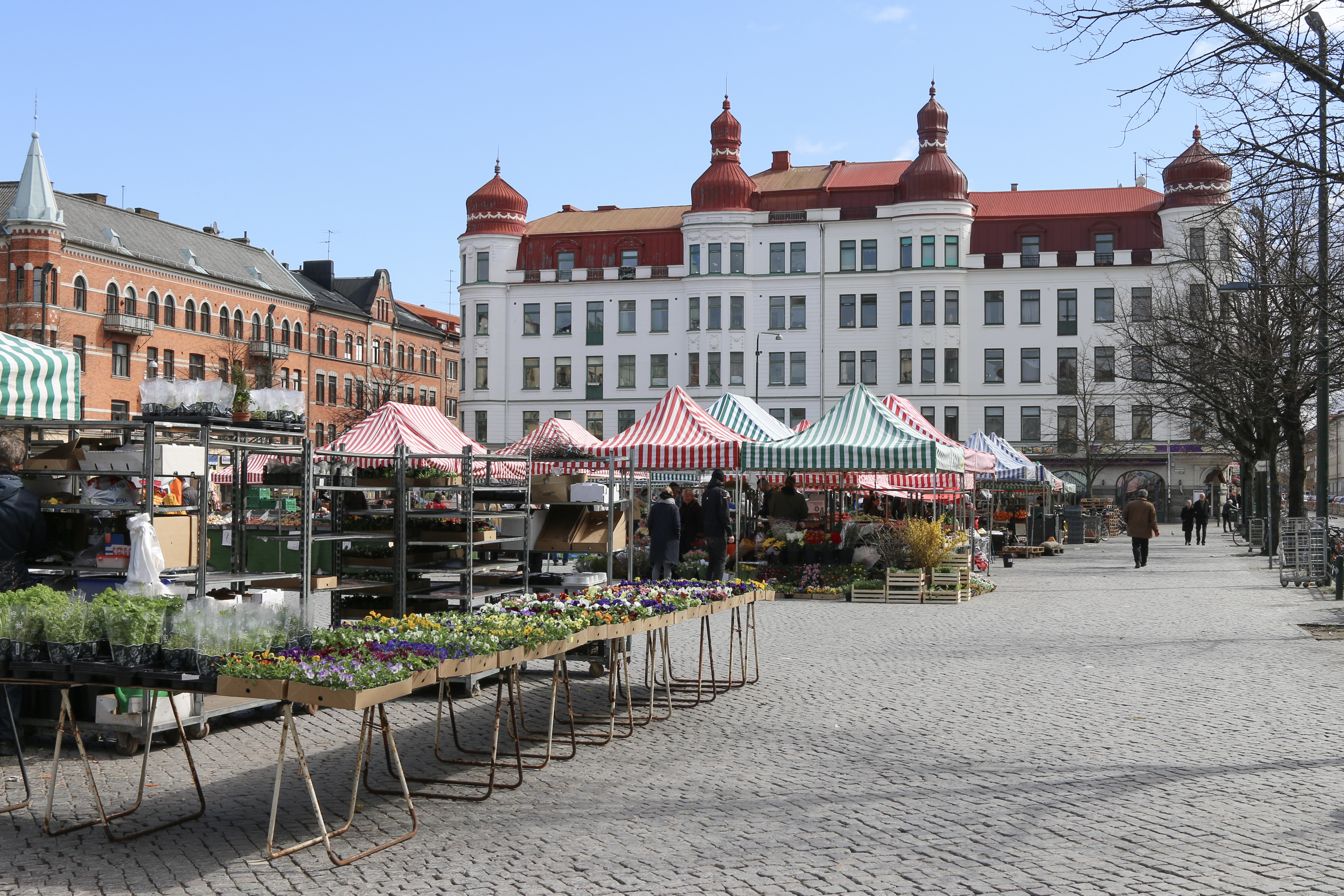
Möllevångstorget and the Art Nouveau building by Harald Berglin.

Construction of Möllevångstorget, the central square, began in 1904 and most surrounding buildings were completed by 1906–1907. These structures were primarily one-room apartments in red brick, though some, like the large white Art Nouveau house designed by architect Harald Berglin, stood out architecturally. Market trading began at Möllevångstorget as soon as it was laid out. Over time, the square became a hub of commerce, selling fruit, vegetables, poultry, and rabbits. The Solidar consumer cooperative opened its first store and bakery here in 1907.

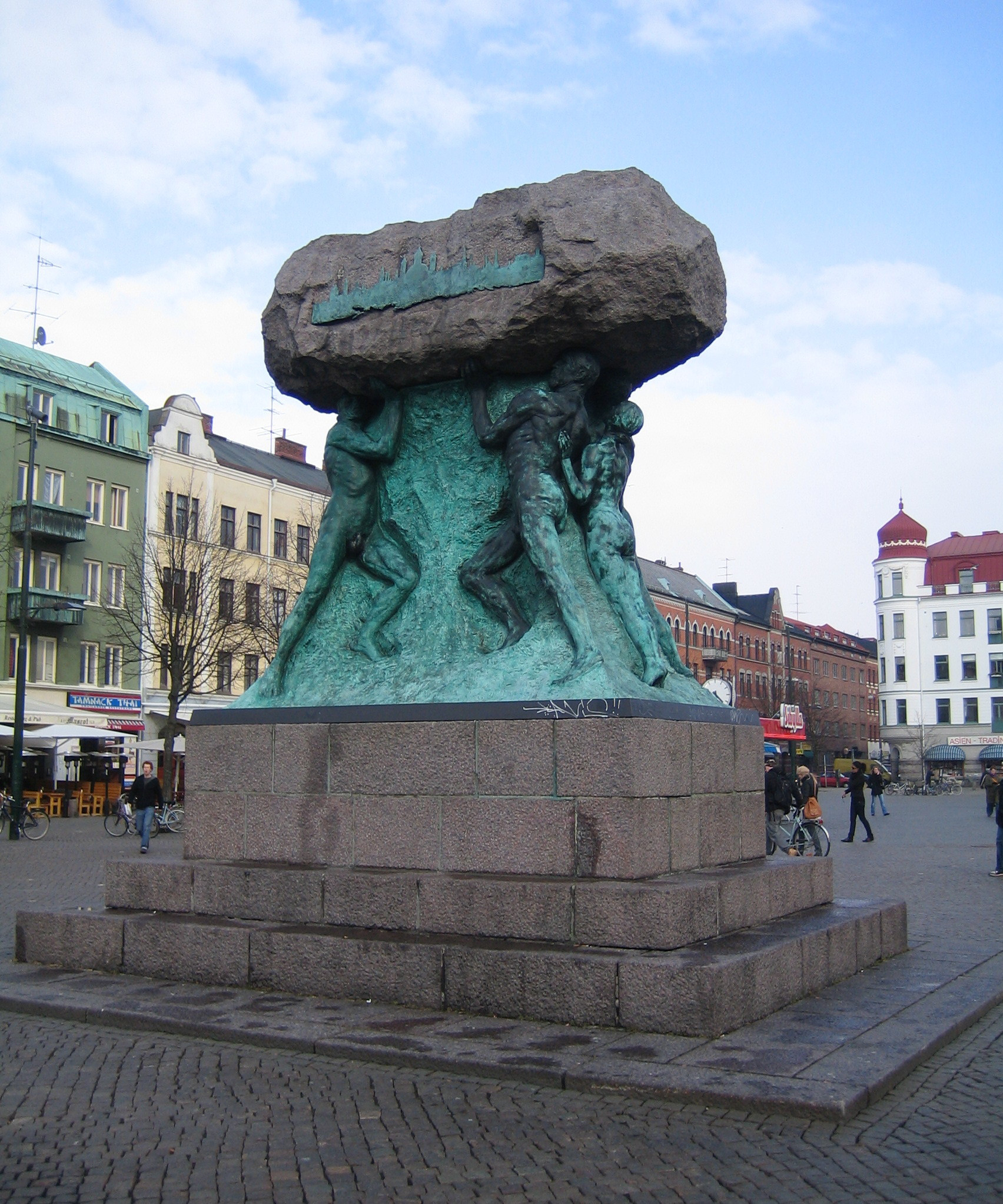
Arbetets ära

Möllevången played a pivotal role in Sweden’s labor movement and social democracy. The first purpose-built People’s House (Folkets Hus) was constructed on Skolgatan in 1893, serving as a meeting place for workers. Nearby, the cooperative association Solidar and the headquarters of the newspaper Arbetet further anchored the area as a center for progressive politics and activism. Demonstrations and rallies, including suffrage and hunger marches, were frequently held at Möllevångstorget, establishing it as a significant arena for political expression.

The square’s importance to the labor movement was commemorated in 1931 by Axel Ebbe’s statue Arbetets ära (Honor of Work). The statue symbolizes the labor movement's contribution to building society, depicting six figures lifting a granite block representing the city, with reliefs of factory chimneys and the city skyline.

=== Post-war decline and revival ===
During the mid-20th century, many families moved to modern suburbs offering amenities that Möllevången's aging housing stock could not provide, such as central heating and indoor plumbing. By the 1960s, much of the area was characterized by physical and social decline, with high crime rates and poor living conditions. However, the neighbourhood began to transform in the 1980s as properties were renovated and young people moved in.

== Demographics ==
As of 2023, Möllevången had 10,904 residents, corresponding to approximately 3% of Malmö's population. 74% of the neighbourhood's inhabitants were of working age (between 20 and 64 years old), while 17% were younger and only 9% are older. Working age residents are over represented in the neighbourhood, compared to the city's average of 62%.

Much like the rest of the city, a significant share of Möllevången's inhabitants have a migrant background. As of 2023, 37% of its inhabitants were born outside of Sweden, while an additional 11% were born in Sweden to two migrant parents. Among those born outside Sweden, 94% originate from countries outside the Nordic countries.

The neighbourhood's inhabitants are on average more highly educated than the city's average, with 61% having completed tertiary education as of 2023. 65% of women residents have completed tertiary education, compared to 56% of men. Despite this, in 2020 the disposable yearly income of Möllevången's inhabitants is 13% lower than the city's average, with men receiving kr 187,455 and women kr 172,400. In 2022, 5% of residents received social benefits at least during part of the year, marginally above the city's average at 4%.

== Transport ==
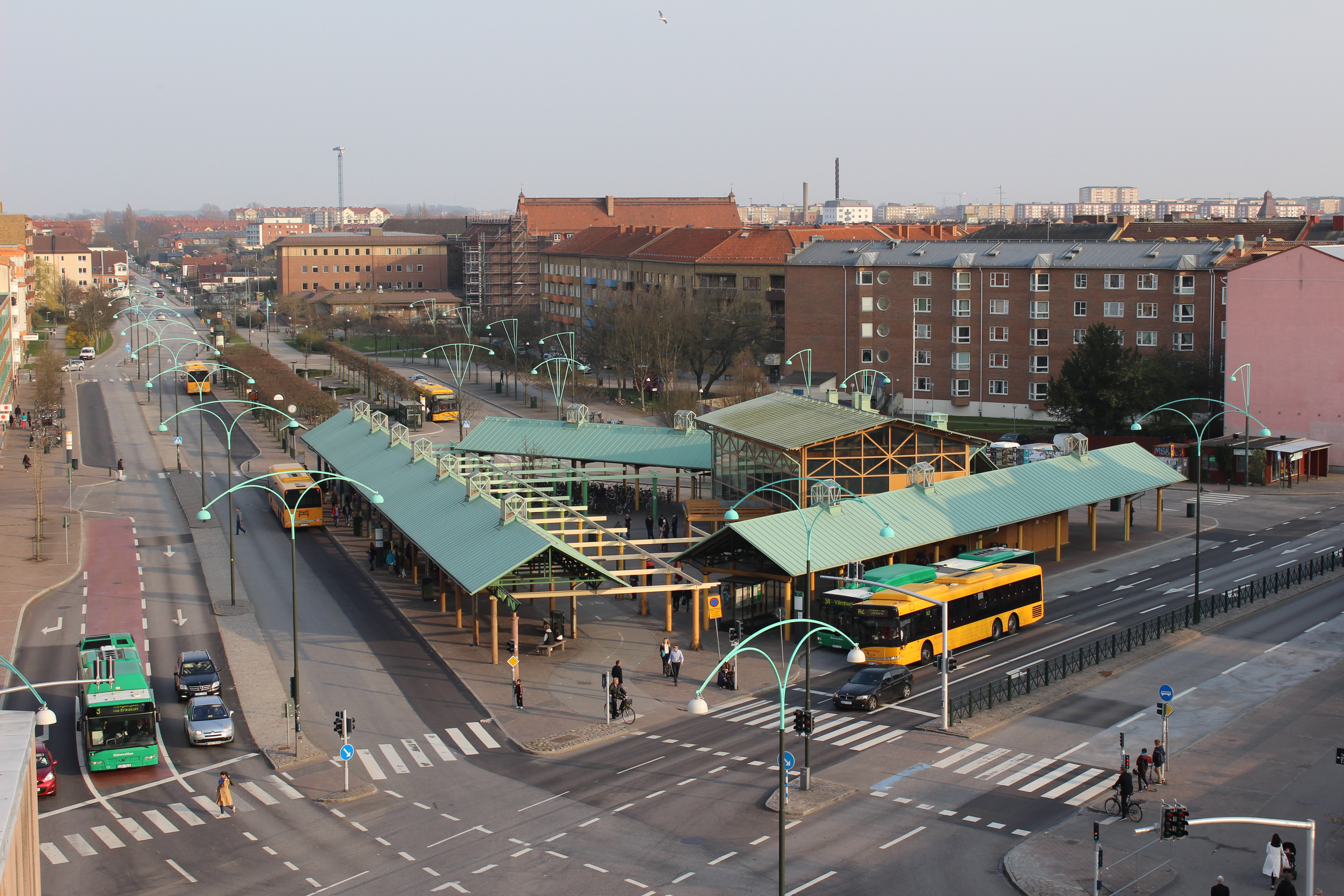
Södervärn bus terminal

Car ownership is low in the neighbourhood, at only 14%, as of 2023, compared to the 24% average in Malmö.

Möllevången is serviced by regular city busses operated by Skånetrafiken, connecting the neighbourhood with the rest of Malmö. Regional busses to various locations in Scania can also be taken from the nearby Södervärn bus terminal or from the stop Malmö Spångatan. Triangeln is the nearest train station to Möllevången, with its southern exit only 400 metres away from Möllevångstorget.

== Notable people ==
- Per Nilsson (born 1954) a writer
