= Frihamnen =

Neighbourhood of Malmö, Sweden

- Neighbourhood
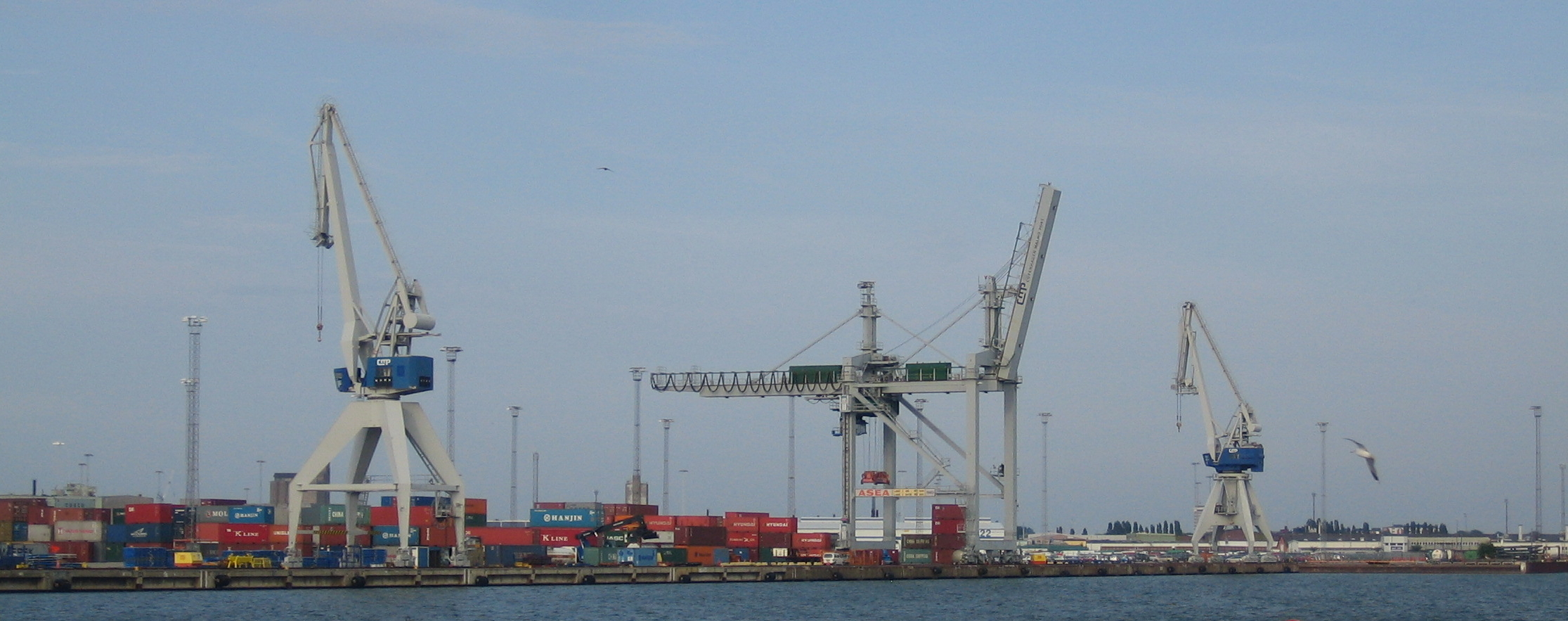
- Frihamnen. International transit harbour in Malmö, Sweden.
- Interactive map of Frihamnen
- Coordinates: 55.61586°N 13.00819°E
- Country: Sweden
- Province: Skåne
- County: Skåne County
- Municipality: Malmö Municipality
- Borough of Malmö: Centrum

Population (1 January 2011)
  - Total: 3
- Time zone: UTC+1 (CET)
  - Summer (DST): UTC+2 (CEST)

Frihamnen is a neighbourhood of Malmö, situated in the Borough of Centrum, Malmö Municipality, Skåne County, Sweden.
