= Universitetssjukhuset MAS =

Allmänna sjukhuset
- Neighbourhood
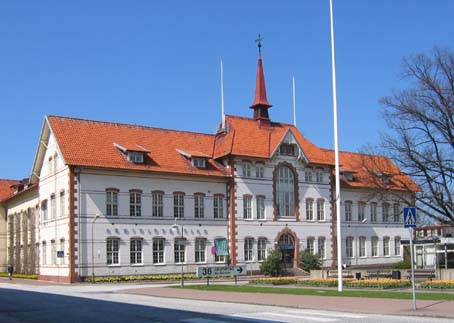
- Interactive map of Allmänna sjukhuset
- Coordinates: 55°35′17″N 13°00′09″E
- Country: Sweden
- Province: Skåne
- County: Skåne County
- Municipality: Malmö Municipality
- Borough of Malmö: Södra Innerstaden

Population (2008)
  - Total: 409
- Time zone: UTC+1 (CET)
  - Summer (DST): UTC+2 (CEST)

Allmänna sjukhuset is a neighbourhood of Malmö, situated in the Borough of Södra Innerstaden, Malmö Municipality, Skåne County, Sweden. As of 2008 it had 409 inhabitants and covers an area of 25 hectares, most of the area taken up by the Skåne University Hospital.
