= Norra hamnen, Malmö =

Coordinates: 55°37′N 13°00′E

Norra hamnen
- Neighbourhood
- Interactive map of Norra hamnen
- Country: Sweden
- Province: Skåne
- County: Skåne County
- Municipality: Malmö Municipality
- Borough of Malmö: Centrum

Population (1 January 2011)
  - Total: 0
- Time zone: UTC+1 (CET)
  - Summer (DST): UTC+2 (CEST)

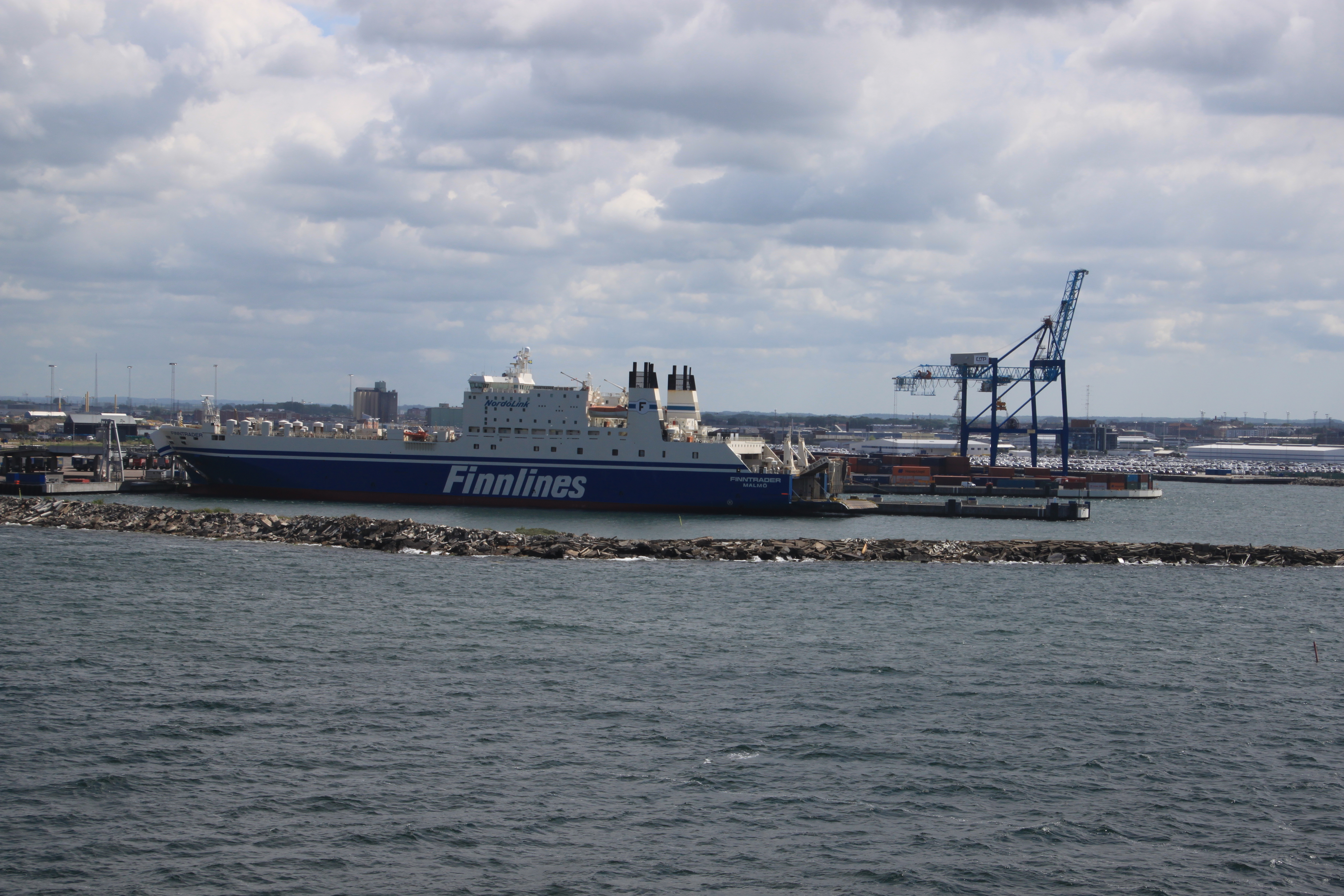
Entrance to Norra hamnen, Malmö

Norra hamnen (Northern Harbour )is a neighbourhood of Malmö, situated in the Borough of Centrum, Malmö Municipality, Skåne County, Sweden.
