= Södra Innerstaden =

- Former city district
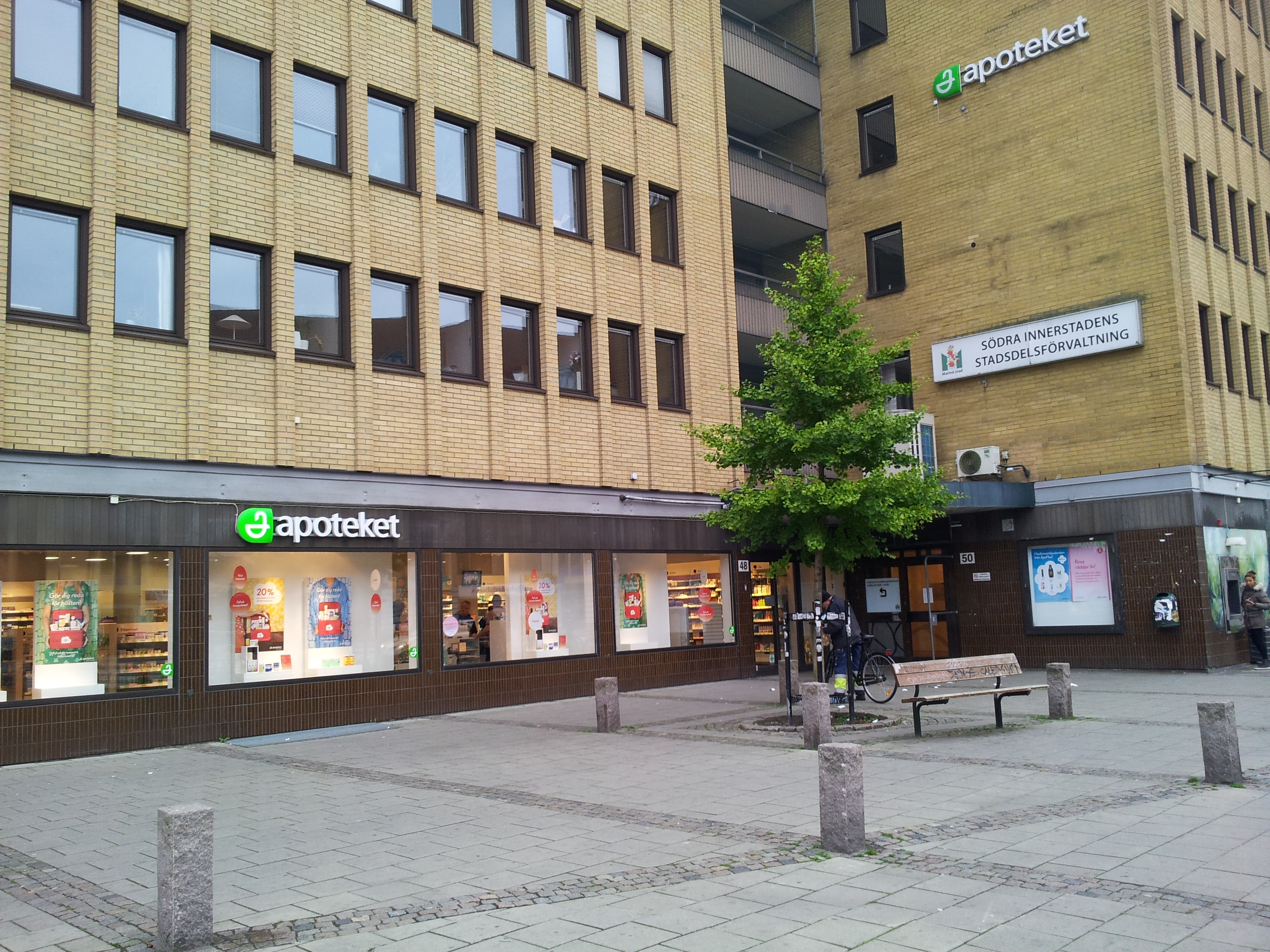
- The former district's administrative office.

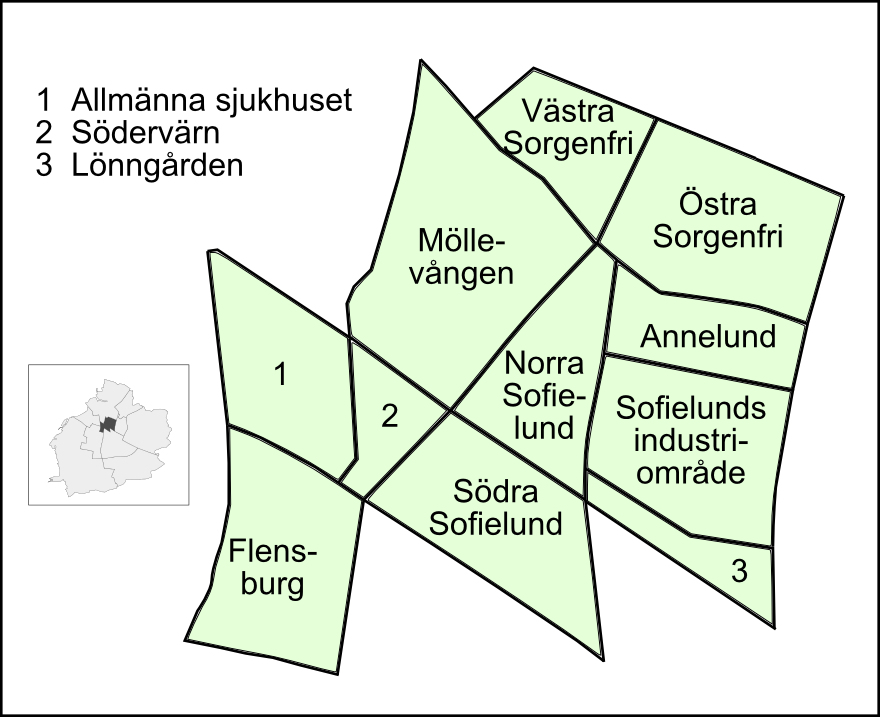
- Södra Innerstaden's neighbourhoods
- Country: Sweden
- Province: Scania
- County: Skåne County
- Municipality: Malmö Municipality

Area
  - Total: 302 ha (750 acres)

Population (2012)
  - Total: 34,671
  - Density: 11,500/km^{2} (29,700/sq mi)
- Time zone: UTC+01:00 (CET)
  - Summer (DST): UTC+02:00 (CEST)

Södra Innerstaden was a city district (Swedish: stadsdel) in the central of Malmö Municipality, Sweden. On 1 July 2013, it was merged with Västra Innerstaden, forming Innerstaden. In 2012, Södra Innerstaden had a population of 34,671 of the municipality's 307,758. The area was 302 hectares.

== Neighbourhoods ==
The neighbourhoods of Södra Innerstaden were:

- Allmänna sjukhuset
- Annelund
- Flensburg
- Lönngården
- Möllevången
- Norra Sofielund
- Sofielunds industriområde
- Södervärn
- Södra Sofielund
- Västra Sorgenfri
- Östra Sorgenfri
