= Lönngården =

- Neighbourhood
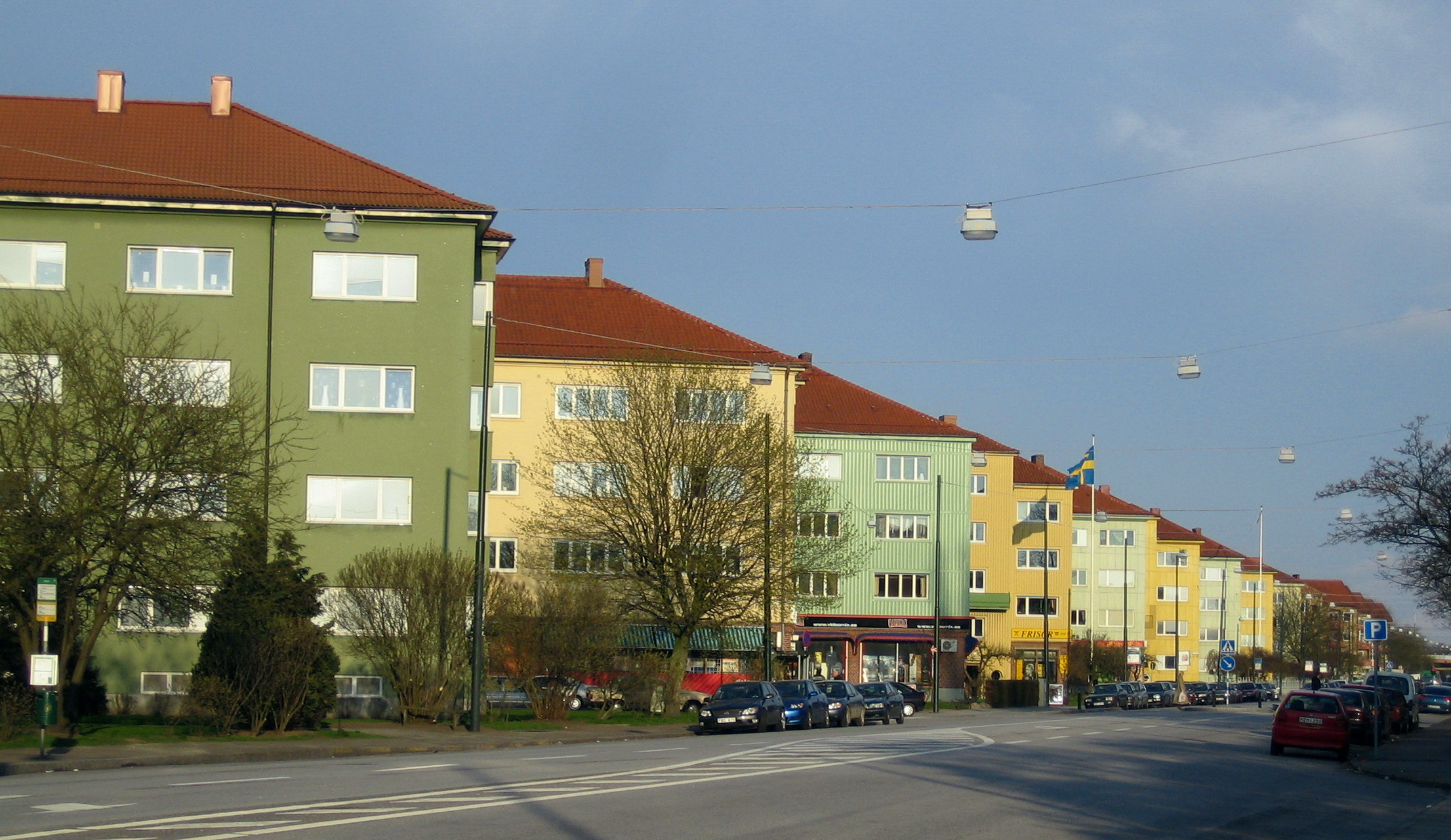
- Interactive map of Lönngården
- Coordinates: 55°34′57″N 13°01′27″E
- Country: Sweden
- Province: Skåne
- County: Skåne County
- Municipality: Malmö Municipality
- Borough of Malmö: Södra Innerstaden

Population (1 January 2011)
  - Total: 1,451
- Time zone: UTC+1 (CET)
  - Summer (DST): UTC+2 (CEST)

Lönngården is a neighbourhood of Malmö, situated in the Borough of Södra Innerstaden, Malmö Municipality, Skåne County, Sweden.
