= Lugnet, Malmö =

Lugnet
- Neighbourhood
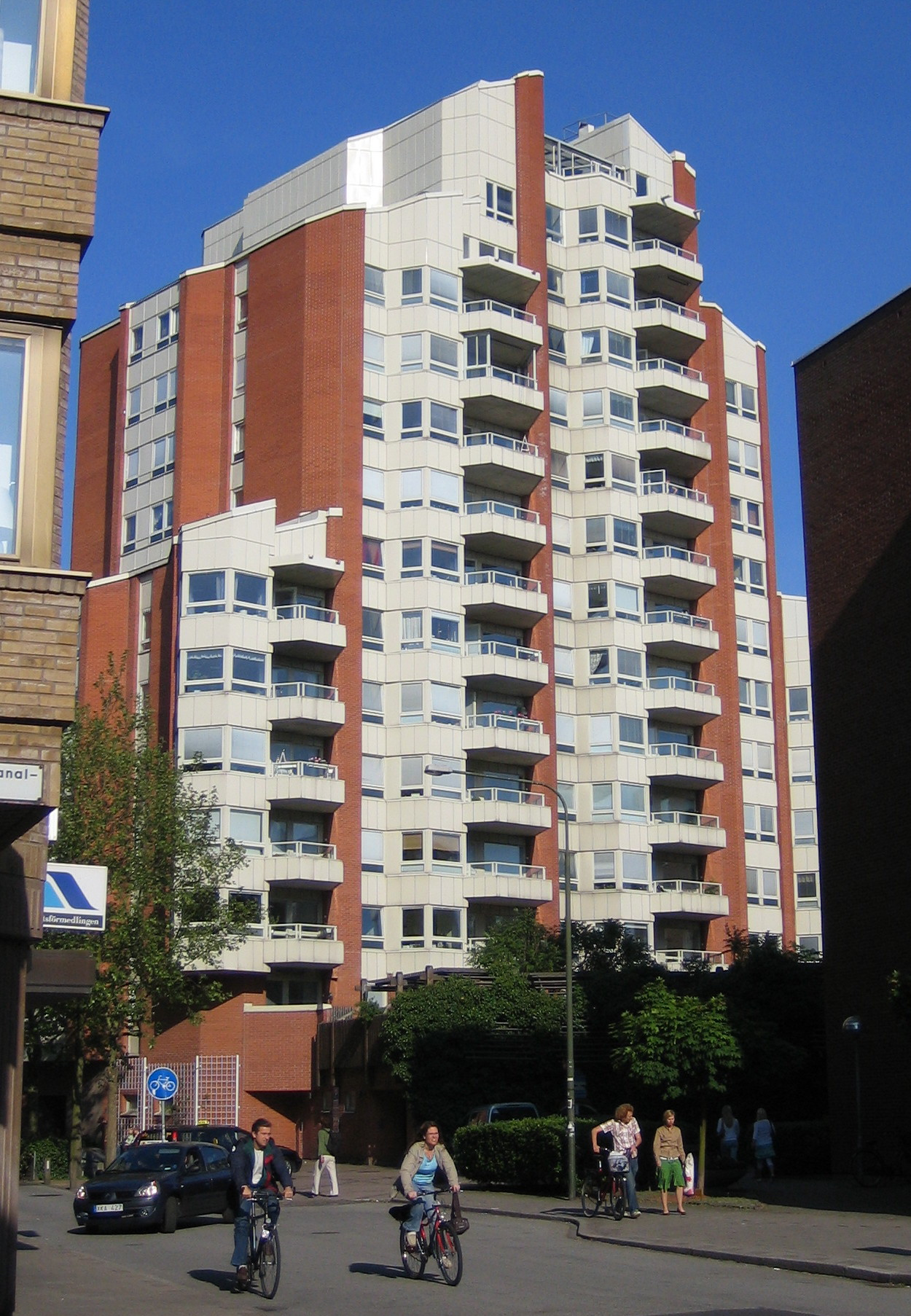
- Interactive map of Lugnet
- Coordinates: 55°35′55″N 13°00′13″E
- Country: Sweden
- Province: Skåne
- County: Skåne County
- Municipality: Malmö Municipality
- Borough of Malmö: Centrum

Population (1 January 2011)
  - Total: 3,105
- Time zone: UTC+1 (CET)
  - Summer (DST): UTC+2 (CEST)

Lugnet is a neighbourhood of Malmö, situated in the Borough of Centrum, Malmö Municipality, Skåne County, Sweden.
