= Östra Sorgenfri =

- Neighbourhood
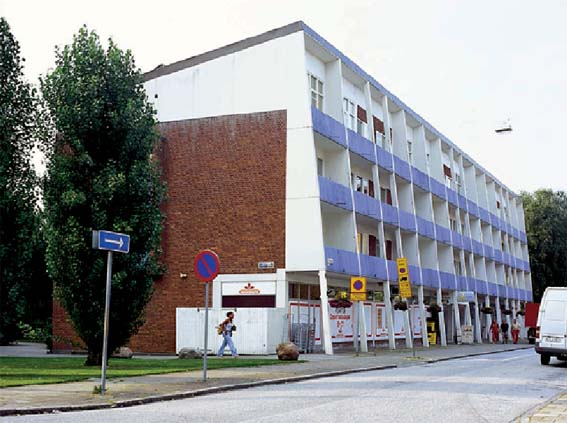
- Interactive map of Östra Sorgenfri
- Coordinates: 55°35′35″N 13°01′35″E
- Country: Sweden
- Province: Skåne
- County: Skåne County
- Municipality: Malmö Municipality
- Borough of Malmö: Södra Innerstaden

Population (1 January 2011)
  - Total: 6,311
- Time zone: UTC+1 (CET)
  - Summer (DST): UTC+2 (CEST)

Östra Sorgenfri is a neighbourhood of Malmö, situated in the Borough of Södra Innerstaden, Malmö Municipality, Skåne County, Sweden.
