= Norr, Malmö =

City district of Malmö, Sweden

Norr
- City district
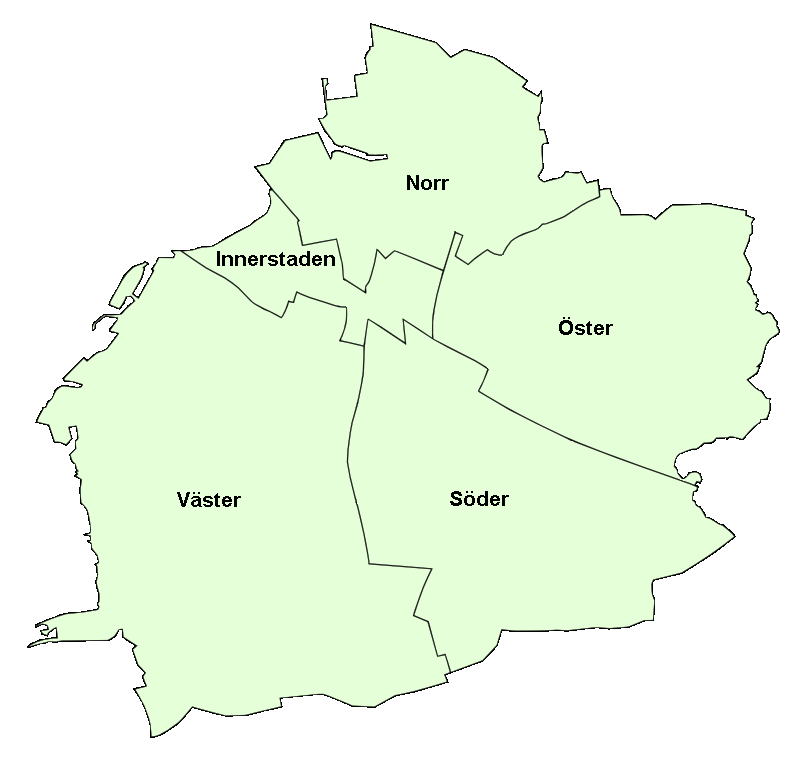
- Malmö's city districts
- Country: Sweden
- Province: Scania
- County: Skåne County
- Municipality: Malmö Municipality

Population (2013)
  - Total: 62,100
- Time zone: UTC+01:00 (CET)
  - Summer (DST): UTC+02:00 (CEST)
- Website: www.malmo.se/norr

Norr (lit. 'North') is a city district (Swedish: stadsområde) in Malmö Municipality, Sweden. It was established on 1 July 2013 after the merger of Centrum and Kirseberg. It has a population of 62,100.
