= Buses in Malmö =

Bus network in Malmö, Sweden

Malmö City Buses
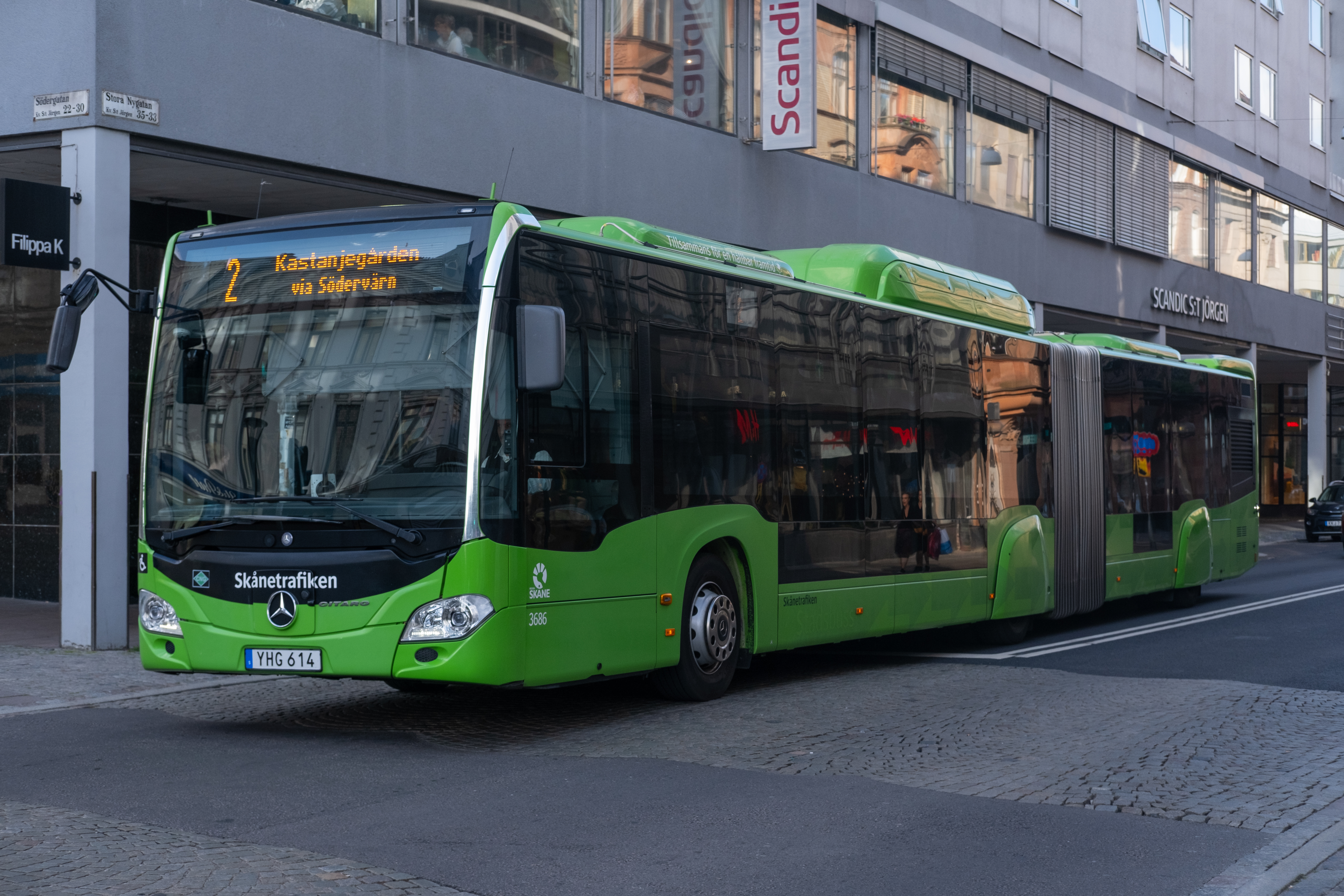
- Mercedes Benz Citaro G operating on Line 2
- Service area: Malmö Municipality
- Routes: 19
- Operator: Nobina on behalf of Skånetrafiken

The Malmö city bus network serves the city of Malmö, Sweden, and its surrounding area with 19 routes. City buses have operated in Malmö since 1927, supplementing and eventually supplanting the city's tram network. Buses continue to serve as the primary means of transport within the city, despite an expansion of intracity train services during the 2010s.

The system is part of the Skånetrafiken transit authority, which contracts Nobina to provide drivers and vehicles.

== History ==
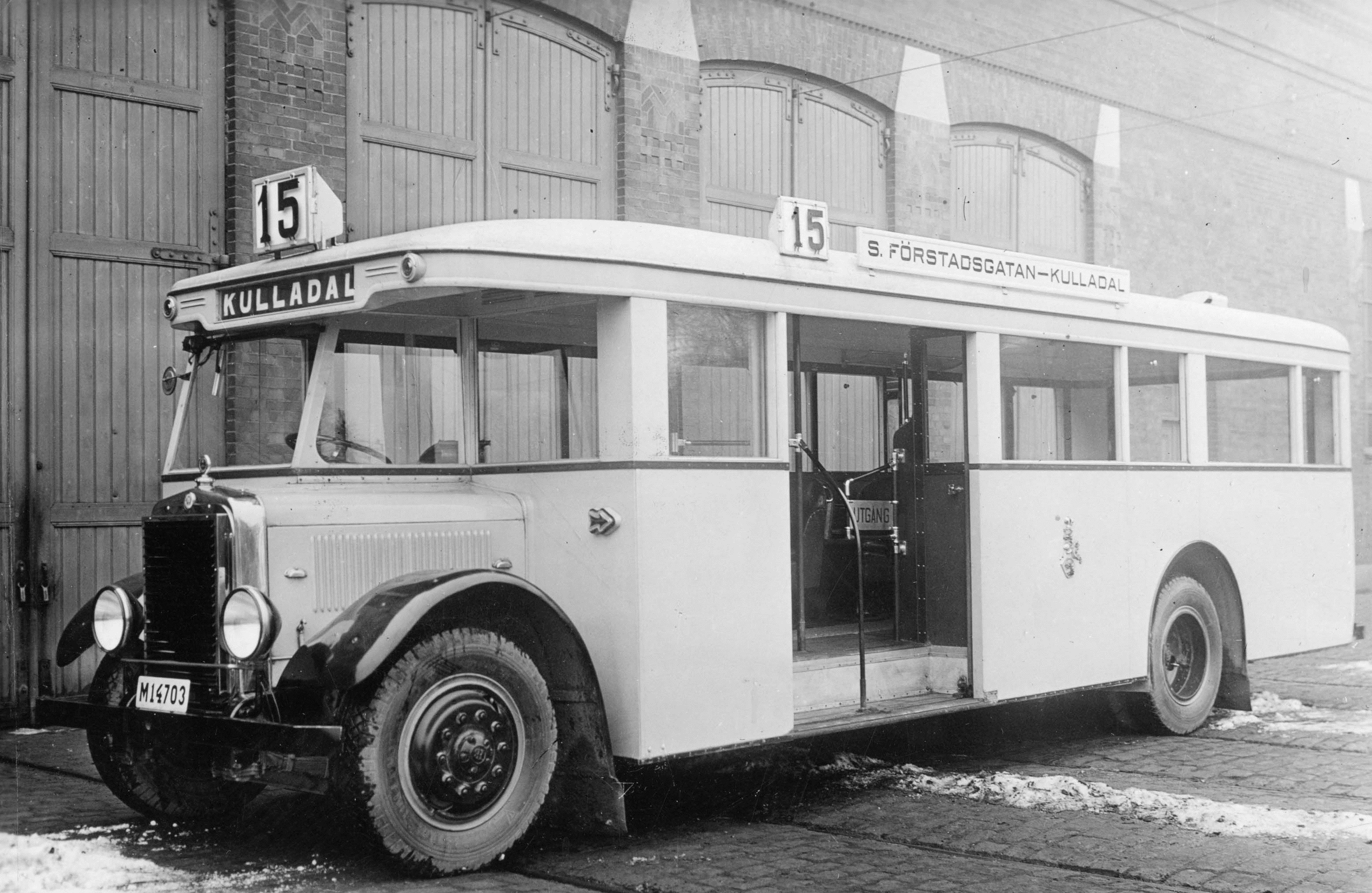
A bus in Malmö in 1929

City buses in Malmö were originally operated by City of Malmö's Tramways (MSS), who acquired their first bus in 1927. With the closure of the last sections of tram network in the early 1970s, responsibility for and operation of city buses were moved to the municipal agency Malmö Lokaltrafik (ML). In 1993 the right-wing municipal government sold ML to Linjebuss, which was then contracted by Länstrafiken Malmöhus to operate city bus services. When Skånetrafiken was formed from the traffic operators of Malmöhus and Kristianstad counties following their mergers into Skåne County, city buses in Malmö became part of Skånetrafiken, with the "ML Green" becoming the colour of city buses throughout Skåne.

On 9 December 2018 the first fully electric buses began operating services in Malmö, when Line 7 received new battery-powered vehicles. In 2021 electric service was further expanded, with larger battery-powered buses being introduced on more lines. Skånetrafiken has set a goal for every bus in Malmö to be electric by 2030.

== Routes ==
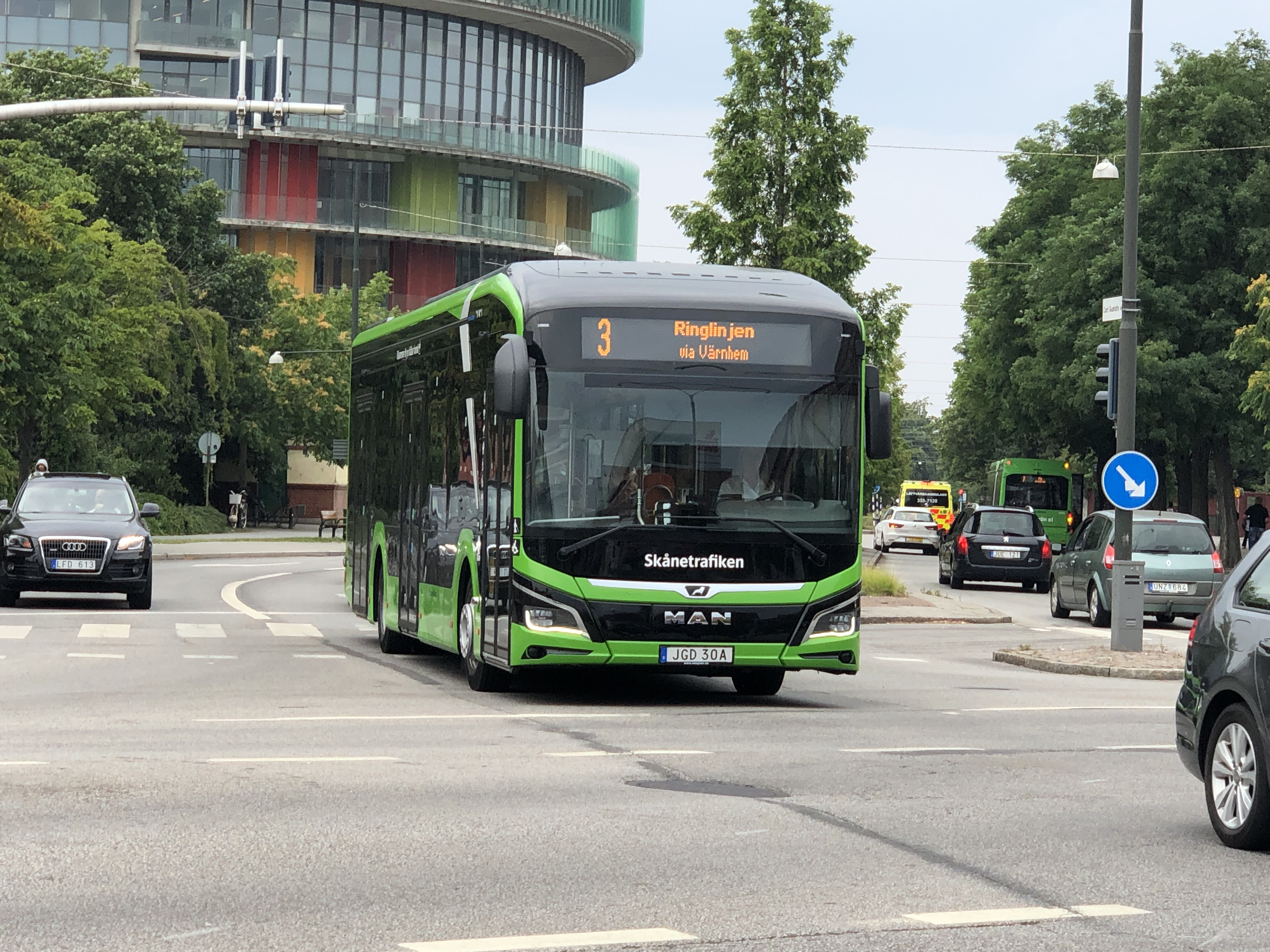
A fully electric bus operating the ring line, Line 3

| Number | Route |
|---|---|
| 1 | G. A. Torg - Triangeln - Södervärn - Persborg - Jägersro - Oxie - Kristineberg |
| 2 | Kastanjegården - Lindängen - Söderkulla - Södervärn - Triangeln - G. A. Torg - Malmö C |
| 3 | Värnhem - Malmö C Norra - Västra Hamnen - Erikslust - Stadion - Södervärn - Värnhem |
| 4 MEX | Annetorp - Limhamn - Erikslust - G. A. Torg - Malmö C - Värnhem - Kirseberg - Segevång - Segemölla |
| 5 MEX | Stenkällan - Rosengård - Nobeltorget - Malmö C - Västra Hamnen |
| 6 | Bunkeflostrand - Hyllie - Holma - Södervärn - Triangeln - Värnhem - Videdal - Toftanäs |
| 7 | Svågertorp - Lindeborg - Södervärn - Triangeln - Malmö C - Västra hamnen - Ribersborg - Limhamns hamnområde - Ön |
| 8 MEX | Lindängen - Nydala - Södervärn - Triangeln - G. A. Torg - Malmö C - Västra hamnen |
| 9 | Ön - Limhamn - Hyllie - Lindängen - Jägersro - Rosengård - Värnhem - Malmö C - Östra hamnen |
| 10 | Malmö C - Dammfri - Lorensborg - Kroksbäck - Hyllie - Svågertorp |
| 11 | Elinegård - Dammfri - G. A. torg - Triangeln -Södervärn - Persborg - Rosengård - Fortuna Hemgården |
| 12 | Klagshamn - Bunkeflostrand - Limhamn - Ribersborg - Malmö C - Nobeltorget - Jägersro - Oxie - Käglinge |
| 13 | Svågertorp - Lindängen - Fosieby - Jägersro - Videdal - Bulltofta - Segevång - Östra hamnen - Malmö C |
| 14 | Sibbarp - Limhamn - Bellevuegården - Södervärn - Värnhem - Segevång - Bernstorp |
| 15 | Kryddgården/Rosengård - Persborg - Södervärn - Triangeln - Värnhem - Östra hamnen - Arlöv |
| 16 | Klagshamn - Bunkeflo - Hyllie |

== Plus lines ==
These buses are described as catchment buses. Their main idea is that they go between different parts of Malmö without travel time being the main focus. These busses go less often between 5-20 min between busses during weekdays. During off peak the plus lines go with 10-30 minute intervall. They end service earlier than the main lines around 21-23 time.

| 35 | Sjölundaviadukten - Östra hamnen - Norra hamnen |
|---|---|
| 37 | Lockarp - Jägersro - Elisedal - Kvarnby by |
| 39 | Malmö C - Mellersta hamnen |
| 84 | Matchbus to Eleda stadium (When MFF are playing) |

Skånetrafiken also operate some specialised routes within Malmö. On days where Malmö FF are playing home games buses are operated as number 84 to Stadion from Klagshamn, Segevång, Riseberga, Nydala and Västra hamnen. A bus service within the Skåne University Hospital area in Malmö is also operated as number 99.

== MalmöExpressen ==
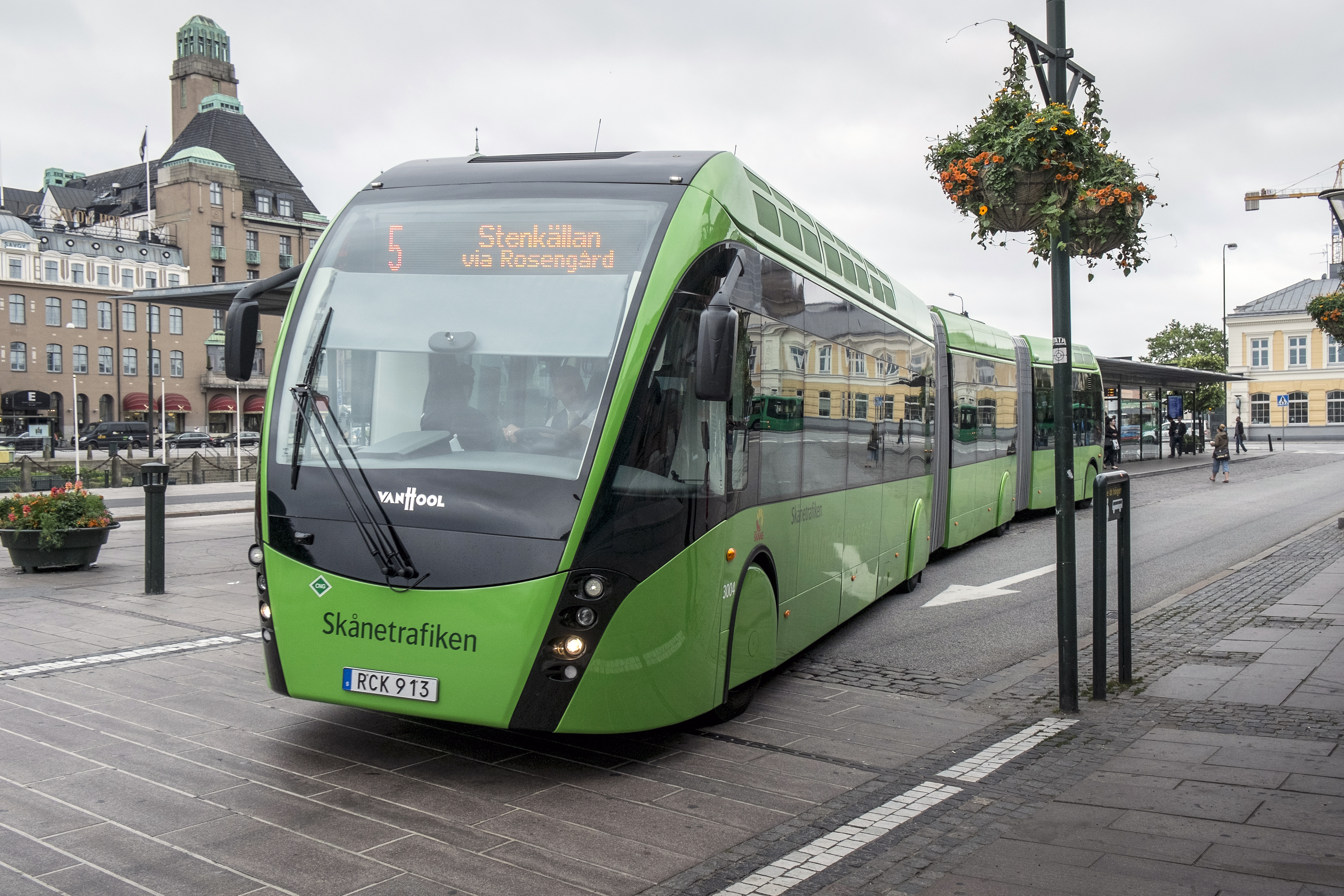
MalmöExpressen bus manufactured by Van Hool on Line 5 at Malmö C.

MalmöExpressen (MEX) is the name used by Skånetrafiken for bus rapid transit services within Malmö. Currently three lines, 4, 5 and 8, are operated as MalmöExpressen, with another two (2 and 10) planned to be converted to MEX standard. MalmöExpressen is operated with gas-electric hybrid buses on Line 5 and fully electric buses on Line 8.

MalmöExpressen Line 5 was the first BRT line to be introduced in Sweden when the first regular service ran on 1 June 2014. Line 5 was originally intended as a stop-gap measure, with the busways built enabling construction of the future tramway being planned at the time. However, political issues resulted in these plans being shelved.
