= Sege =

Sege may refer to:

- Sege (Ghana parliament constituency)
- Sege (town), district capital of Ada West District, Ghana
- Sege River, a river in southern Sweden
- Sege industriområde, a neighbourhood of Malmö, Sweden

== See also ==
- Sege sege, a part of the djembe drum
