= Drottningtorget =

Drottningtorget (English: Queens Square) is a common name for public squares in Swedish cities, the three best known being:

- Drottningtorget, Gothenburg
- Drottningtorget, Malmö
- Drottningtorget, Linköping
