= Gustav Adolfs torg =

Gustav Adolfs torg is the name of several squares in Sweden.

- Gustav Adolfs torg, Stockholm
- Gustaf Adolfs torg, Göteborg
- Gustav Adolfs torg, Malmö
- Gustav Adolfs torg, Helsingborg
