= Rostorp =

- Neighbourhood
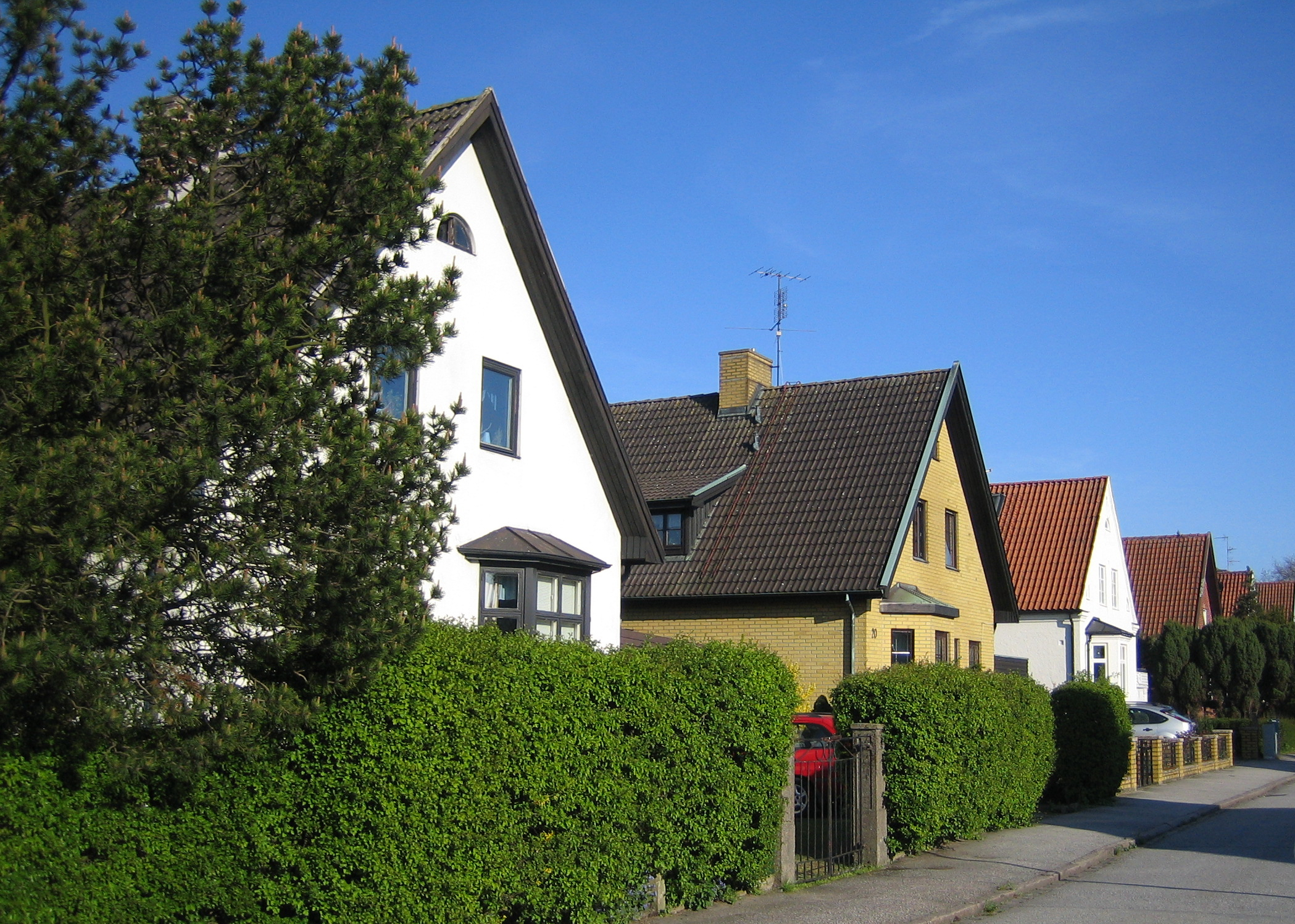
- Interactive map of Rostorp
- Coordinates: 55°36′47″N 13°02′43″E
- Country: Sweden
- Province: Skåne
- County: Skåne County
- Municipality: Malmö Municipality
- Borough of Malmö: Kirseberg

Population (1 January 2011)
  - Total: 1,139
- Time zone: UTC+1 (CET)
  - Summer (DST): UTC+2 (CEST)

Rostorp is a neighbourhood of Malmö, situated in the borough of Kirseberg, Malmö Municipality, Skåne County, Sweden. Rostorp is a sub-area containing mainly villas, with its residential buildings mostly built between 1992 and 1993. It is situated west of Östra Fäladsgatan, surrounded by Kirsebergsstaden and south-east of Lundavägen.

In Rostorp there is a preschool named Rostorps preschool. A now-closed prison, Anstalten Rostorp, was located within the previously closed mental hospital named Östra Sjukhuset, which is east of the residential area.
