= Malmö Teater =

Theater in Sweden (1809–1938)

Coordinates: 55.60324664183643°N 13.001855138992914°E

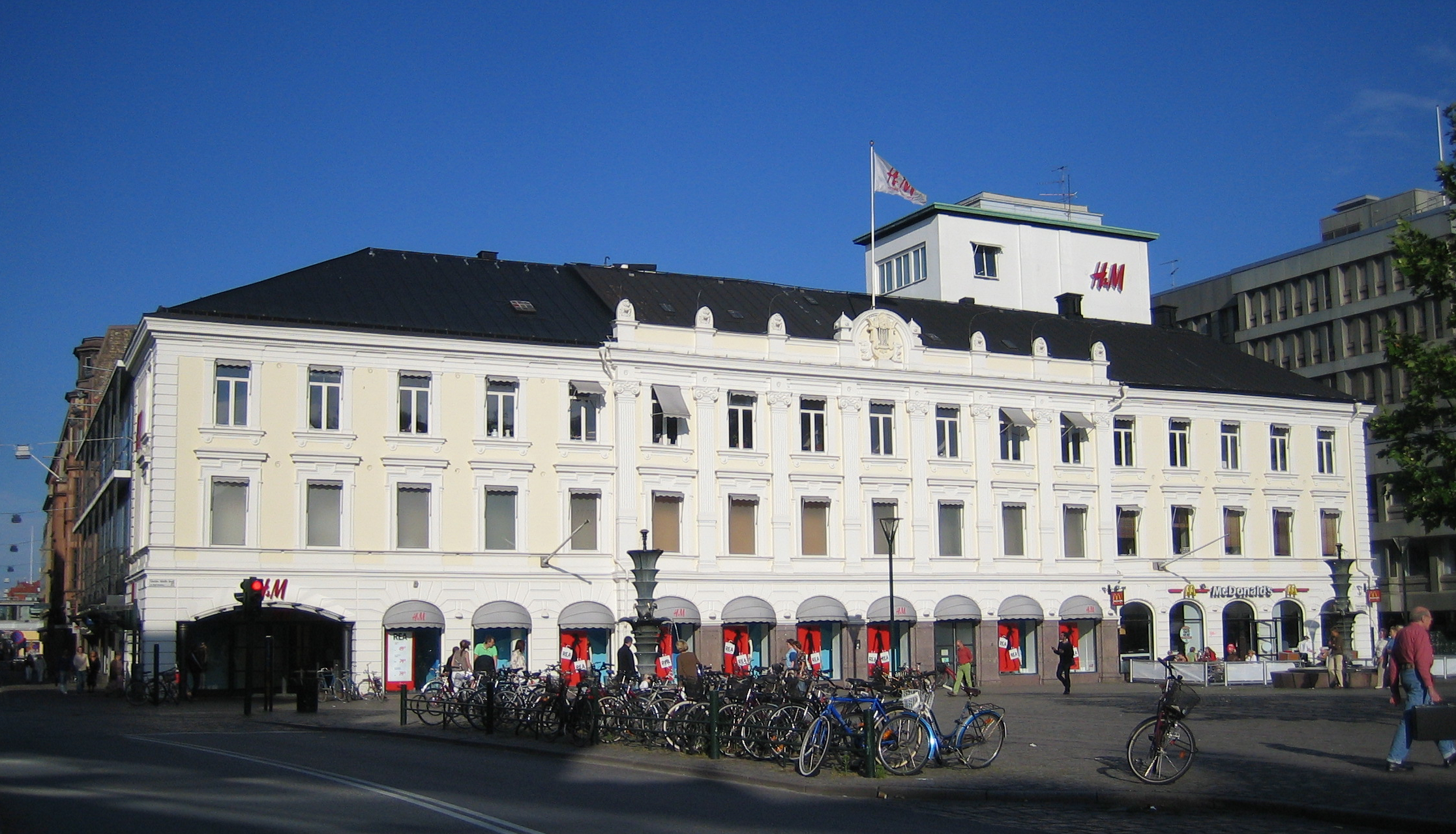
Malmö Teater

Malmö Teater or Malmö Theater, formally Kongl. Priwilegierade Theatern i Malmö ("royal theater of Malmö"), was a theater in Malmö in Sweden, active between 1809 and 1938. It was situated on Stora Nygatan street, with an entrance on Gustav Adolfs Square.

== History ==
The city of Malmö was often visited by travelling theater companies during the 18th century, and Malmö Teater itself was constructed in 1806–1809. It was inaugurated on 16 October 1809. Jenny Lind performed there in 1840, and August Bournonville and Sarah Bernhardt did so in 1883. During the early 20th century, Albert Ranft's company regularly performed there. The theater was closed in 1938, and the building was repurposed into shops.
