= Johanneslust =

- Neighbourhood
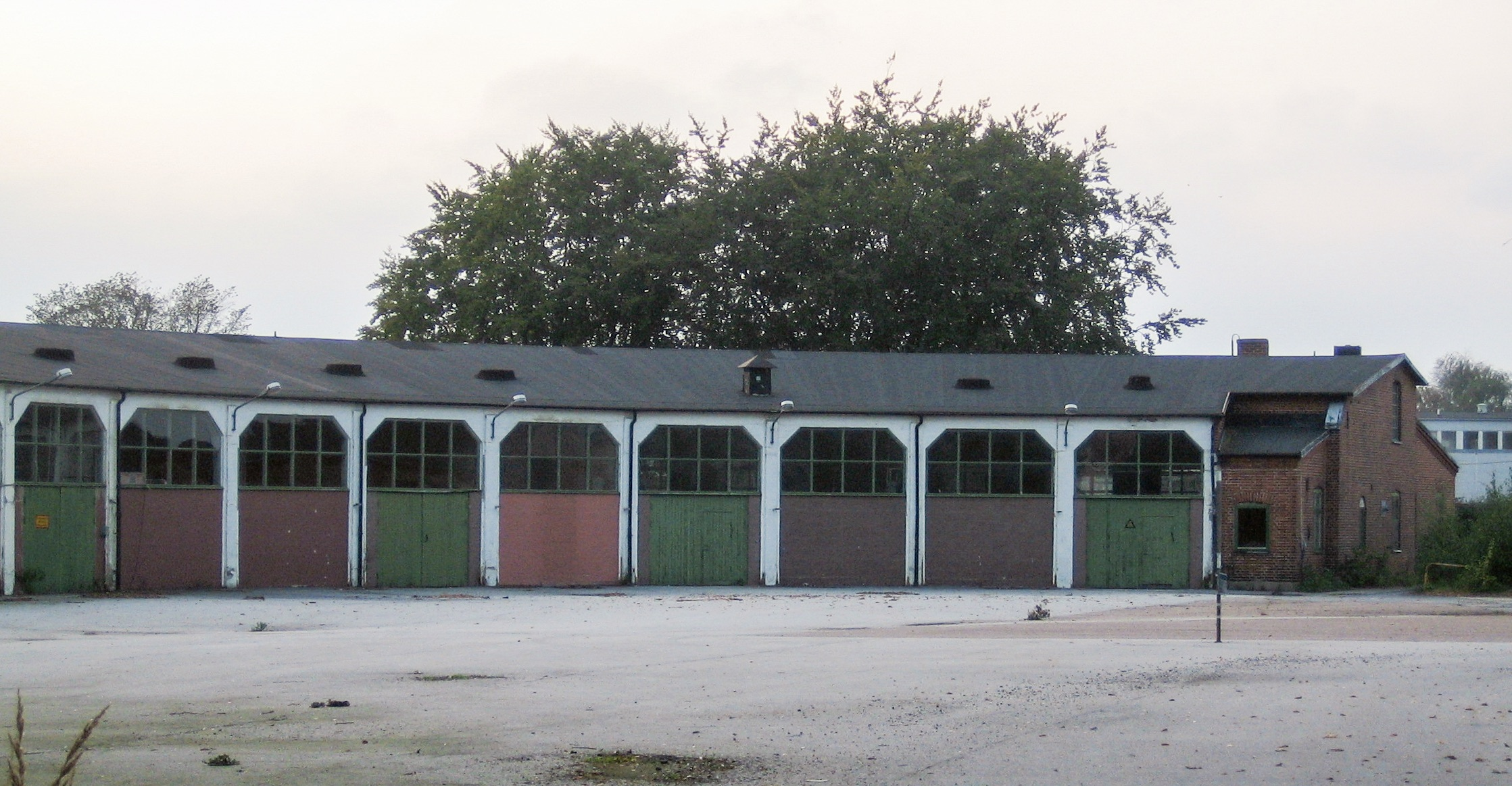
- Interactive map of Johanneslust
- Coordinates: 55°36′05″N 13°02′51″E
- Country: Sweden
- Province: Skåne
- County: Skåne County
- Municipality: Malmö Municipality
- Borough of Malmö: Kirseberg

Population (1 January 2011)
  - Total: 1,022
- Time zone: UTC+1 (CET)
  - Summer (DST): UTC+2 (CEST)

Johanneslust is a neighbourhood of Malmö, situated in the Borough of Kirseberg, Malmö Municipality, Skåne County, Sweden.
