= Adelgatan =

Street in Malmö, Sweden

Coordinates: 55°36′26″N 13°0′0″E

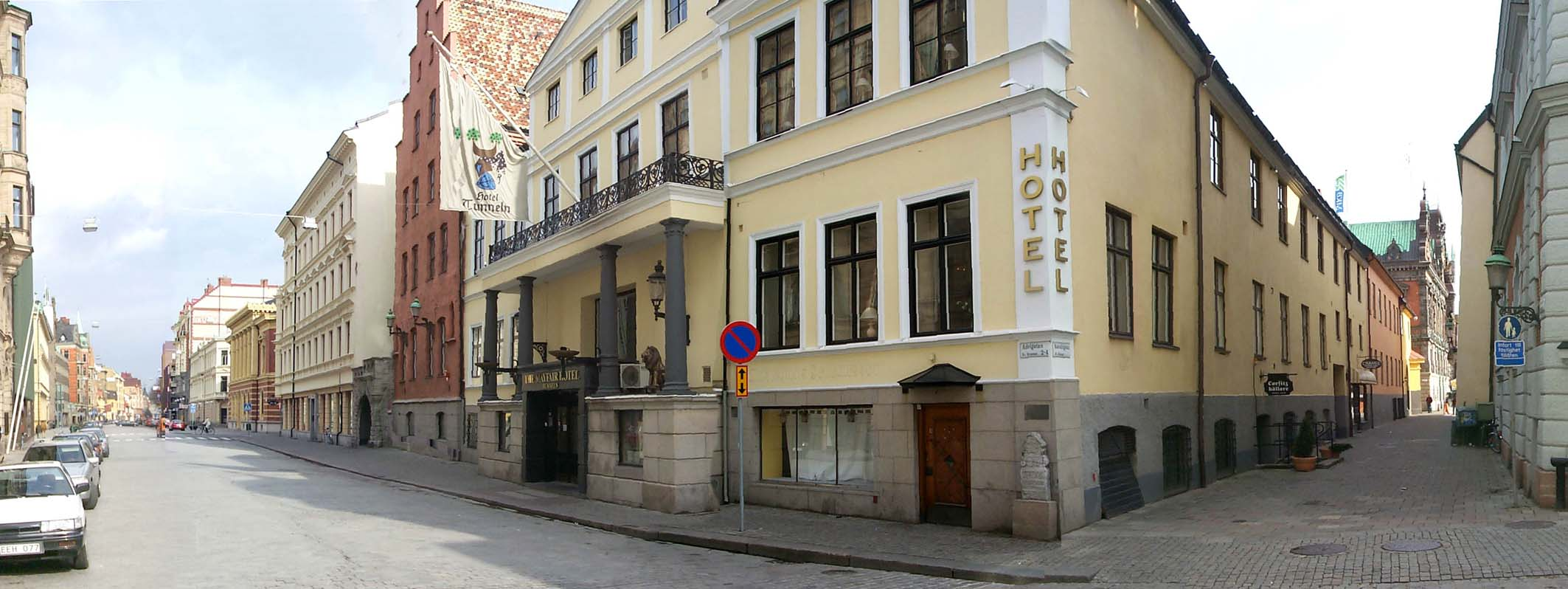
Tunneln

Adelgatan was, together with Östergatan and Västergatan, Malmö's main street from the Middle Ages.

During the Middle Ages there were two Adelgatan's. The elder ran from west to east direction parallel to the beach only a stone's throw from it. It was called in 1392 in Latin "Communis magna platea". It was the city's oldest street, which probably existed as a narrow road even before the city's emergence in 1250s. Today this route is in the Malmöhus Castle area leading up to Drottningtorget.

The second Adelgatan was the main street in the early 14th century which ran perpendicular to the former further south. This was called "Sönnergaatan" in 1462 and "Then syndre Adelgade" in 1522. "

They formed grand squares and had boundary markers consisting of standing stones. Such a stone was the "Tunneln", one at the current Caroli Church and the last at the junction of Skomakaregatan and Södergatan. Trade with the peasants during the Middle Ages were only allowed inside the marked square areas.
