= Svågertorp railway station =

Railway station in Malmö, Sweden

Malmö South, Svågertorp Station
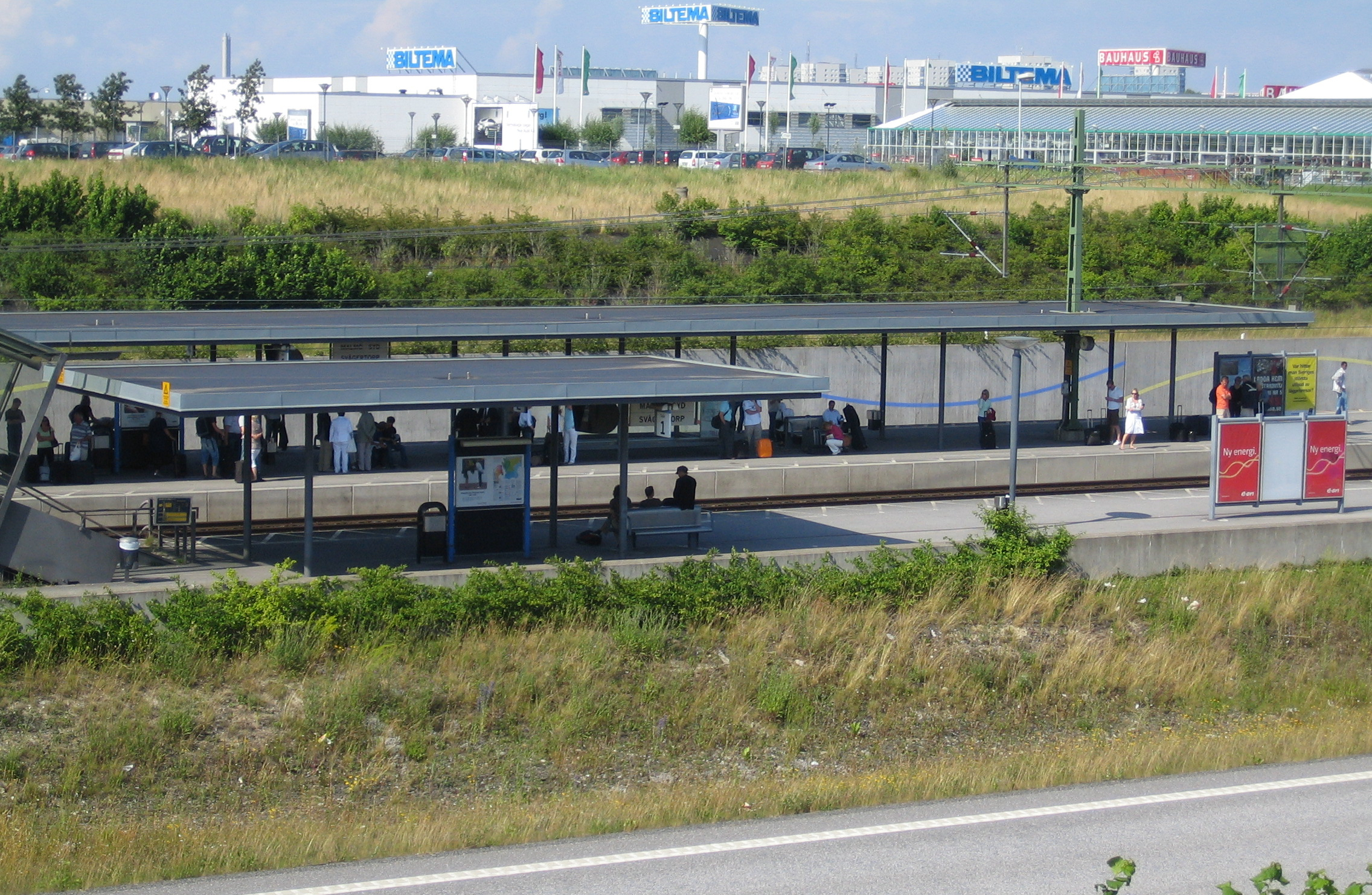

General information
- Location: Svågertorp, Malmö; Sweden
- Coordinates: 55°32′51″N 12°59′29″E
- Operator: Trafikverket
- Lines: Öresund Line; Continental Line
- Platforms: 2
- Tracks: 4
- Connections: Bus: Line 7, Line 10, Line 13,

Other information
- Station code: Stp

History
- Opened: 2000

Services
Preceding station	Pågatågen	Following station
Hyllie towards Lund C	Line 9	Västra Ingelstad towards Trelleborg
Hyllie towards Kävlinge	Line 11	Persborg towards Malmö C
Location

Malmö South, Svågertorp Station, (Swedish: Svågertorp Station, Malmö syd) is a railway station in southern Malmö, Sweden. It is served by Pågatåg commuter trains running between Trelleborg and Kristianstad, as well as on the Malmöpendeln line.

== History ==
Svågertorp Station opened in 2000 in connection with a new railway and the Öresund Bridge between Denmark and Sweden. The station was originally served by the Øresund trains until the opening of the City Tunnel in 2010. It used to be the only station en route between Malmö Central Station and Copenhagen Airport railway station. Due to the proximity to Copenhagen Airport, some airlines had self-service check-in facilities at the station.

Starting in 2021, the northbound Snälltåget night train from Berlin and Hamburg to Malmö and Stockholm Central Station stops at Svågertorp station for Swedish border police checks, but not for passengers to board or alight. And since 2022, the northbound SJ Euronight also stops there for border control.
