= Trams in Malmö =

Public transit system in Malmö, Sweden

Malmö tramway
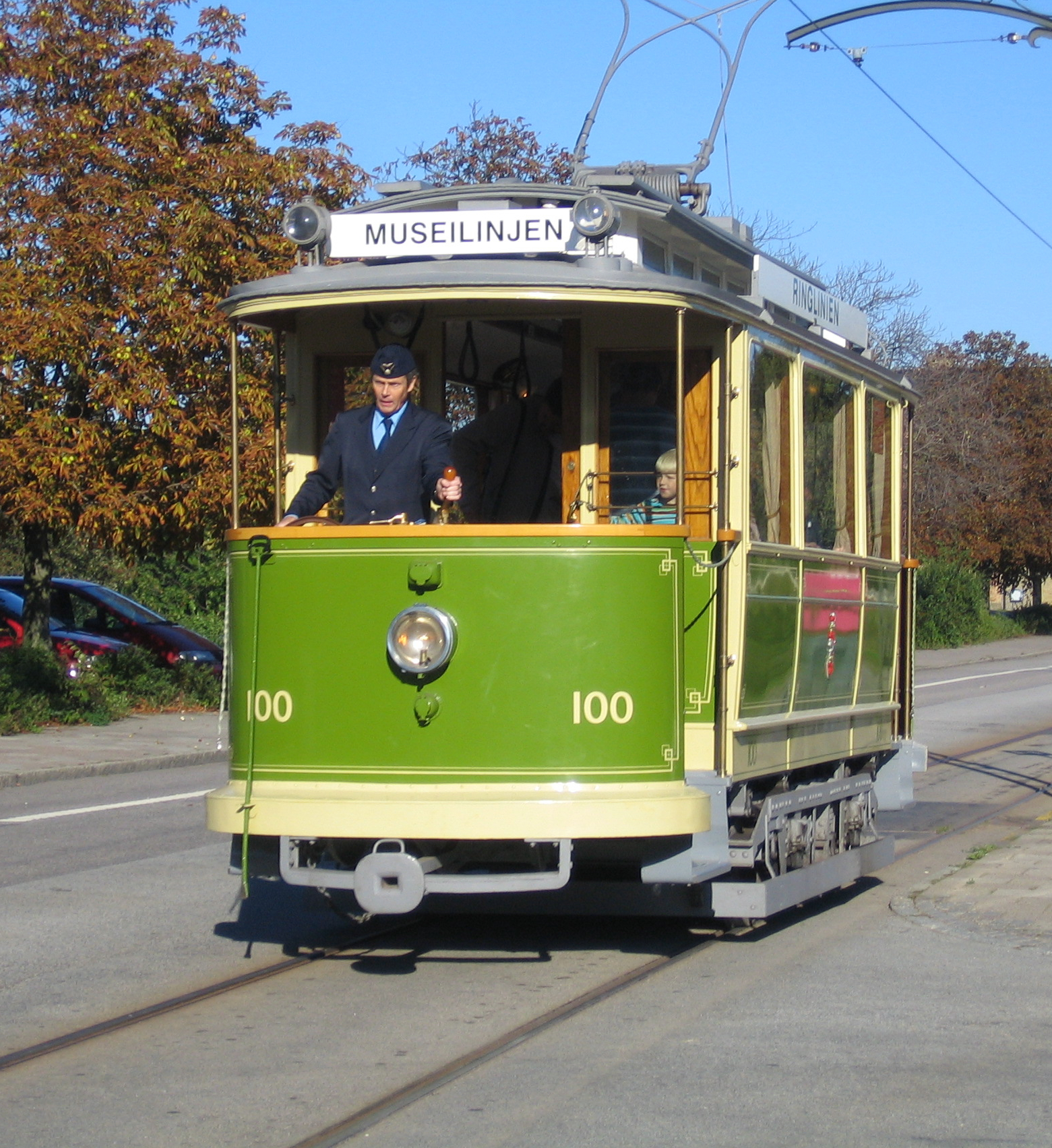
- Car 100 in service as a heritage tram

Overview
- Locale: Malmö, Sweden
- Transit type: Tram
- Number of lines: 1
- Number of stations: 6

Operation
- Began operation: 1887 (horsecar); 1906 (electric trams); 1987 (heritage line)
- Ended operation: 1973 (original tramway)

Technical
- System length: 2 km (1.2 mi)
- Track gauge: 1,435 mm (4 ft 8 1/2 in) standard gauge

The Malmö tramway network was a tram network that existed as a public transit system in Malmö, Sweden in some extent from 1887 until 1973. In 1987 a new route of about 2 km (1.2 mi) was built as a historic line, which remains in operation today.

== History ==
The tramway operated between 1887 and 1973. It started service as a horsecar. The horsecars were replaced by electric trams starting in December 1906, with the last horses being retired in February 1907. With the introduction of right-hand traffic in 1967 most tram lines were withdrawn and replaced by buses, although line 4 to Sibbarp remained until April 27 1973.

== Lines ==
The following lines are listed by the Tramway Museum Society.

Number	Years	Route
1	1907-1967	Östervärn-Södervärn
2	1907-1940	Hamnen-Södervärn
3	1906-1964	(Ring line) Värnhem-Gustav Adolfs torg-Värnhem
4	1907-1973	Gustav Adolfs torg-Limhamn
5	1915-1928	Gustav Adolfs torg-Stjärnplan(-Fridhem-Ribersborg)
6	1916-1919, 1924-1949	Värnhem-Hohög
7	1918-1949	Schougens bro-Frihamnen
8	1928-1930	Malmö Central Station-Södervärn

== Rolling stock ==
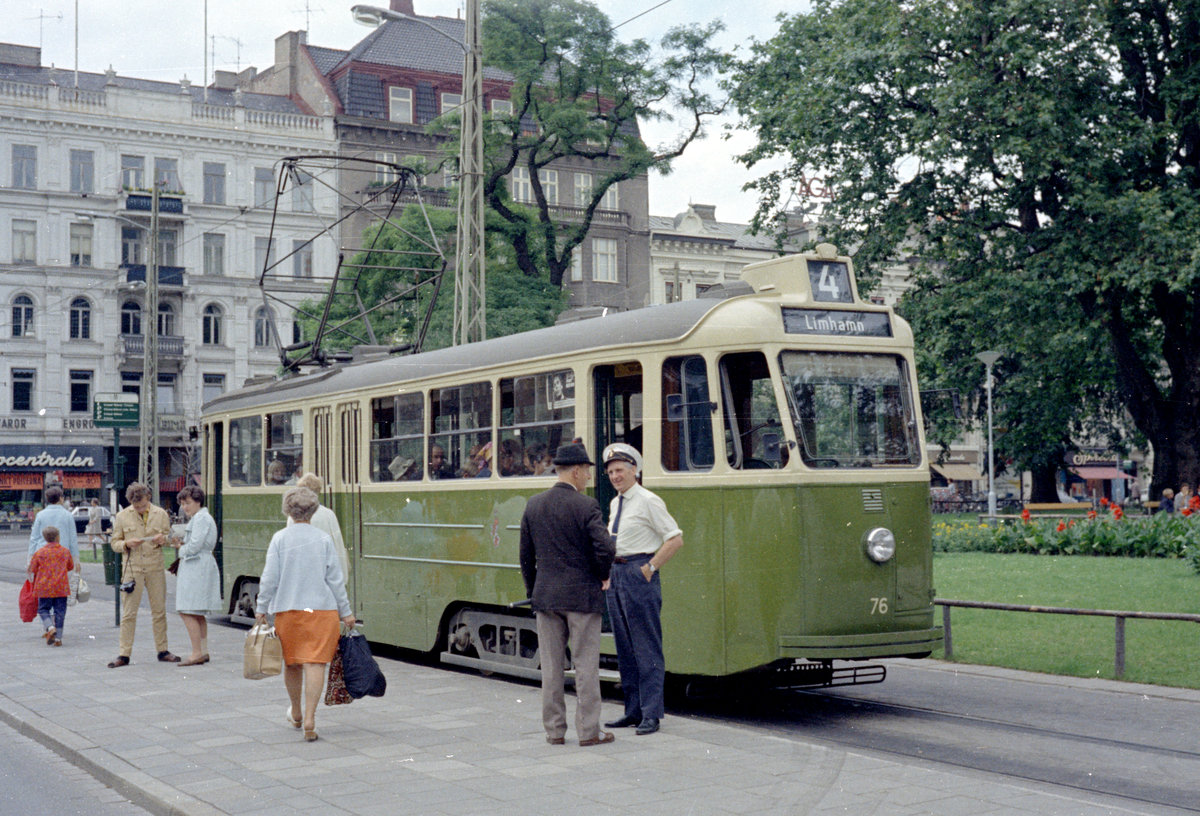
Type 'G' Tram no. 76 at Gustav Adolfs torg, July 1968

The service primarily used two-axle cars. From 1946 Type 'G' bogie cars manufactured by GM and ASEA were introduced on line 4 and from 1951-2, new two-axle cars were provided for the other remaining routes.

== Proposed reintroduction ==
Building a new tram network in Malmö has been proposed several times, with the municipal board beginning planning work in 2009. However, conflicting views between the municipal and regional government resulting in the planned funding from both regional and national authorities not being available resulted in these plans being shelved, with plans for busways to replace and supplement the planned tramways. Currently five busways are planned under the Malmöexpressen BRT concept, with two already opened as of February 2023.

== Museum line ==
For the 100-year anniversary of public transit in Malmö a new heritage line was constructed in 1987, along with an old tram being refurbished for use on the line. The 2km long line begins at the technical museum, with termini at the city library and Malmöhus Castle. The heritage line began operating in August 1987, with services operating during summer weekends starting in 1988.
