= Drottningtorget, Malmö =

Square in Malmö, Sweden

Coordinates: 55.608345°N 13.009915°E

Drottningtorget (English: Queen Square) is a major public square in central Malmö, Sweden. It lies between the main town square and Värnhem. The area dates back to at least the Middle Ages when the Adelgatan, one of the city's main streets, led to it and it became an important peasant trading centre. However, the modern square was built in the 1810s, when the old fortifications surrounding the town were removed.

The square was named after the Swedish queen Frederica of Baden, while Gustav Adolfs torg, which was built at the same time, was named after the Swedish king Gustav IV Adolf.

The building on the square's north side was built in 1819 as a riding hall. In 1900, it became the first covered market hall in Malmö. East and west of the square are houses from the 1890s and early 1900s, while the south side is flanked by an office building from the 1960s.

Sometimes an organized flea market takes place on the square. The Red Cross have a building in the area.

== Gallery ==
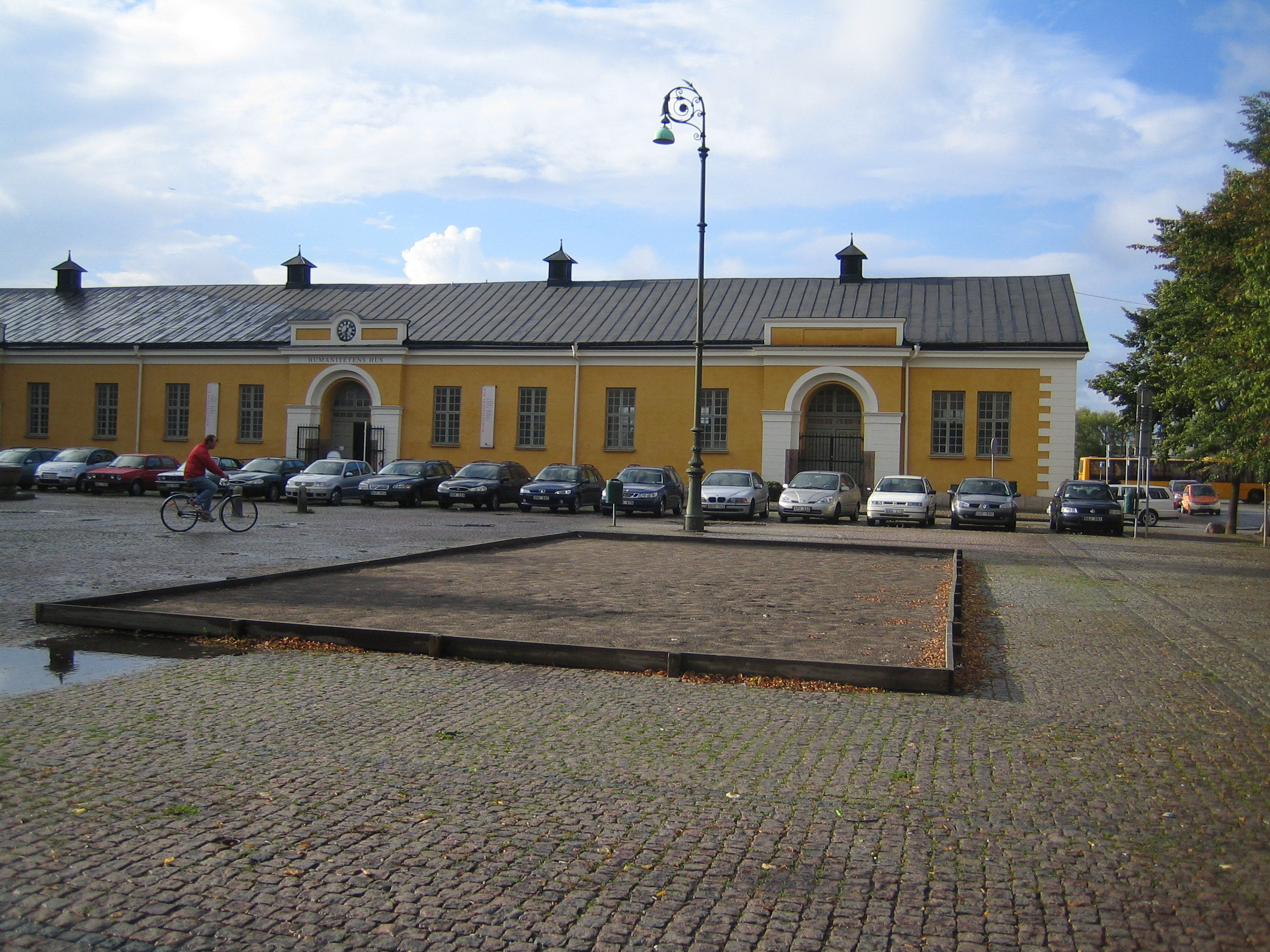

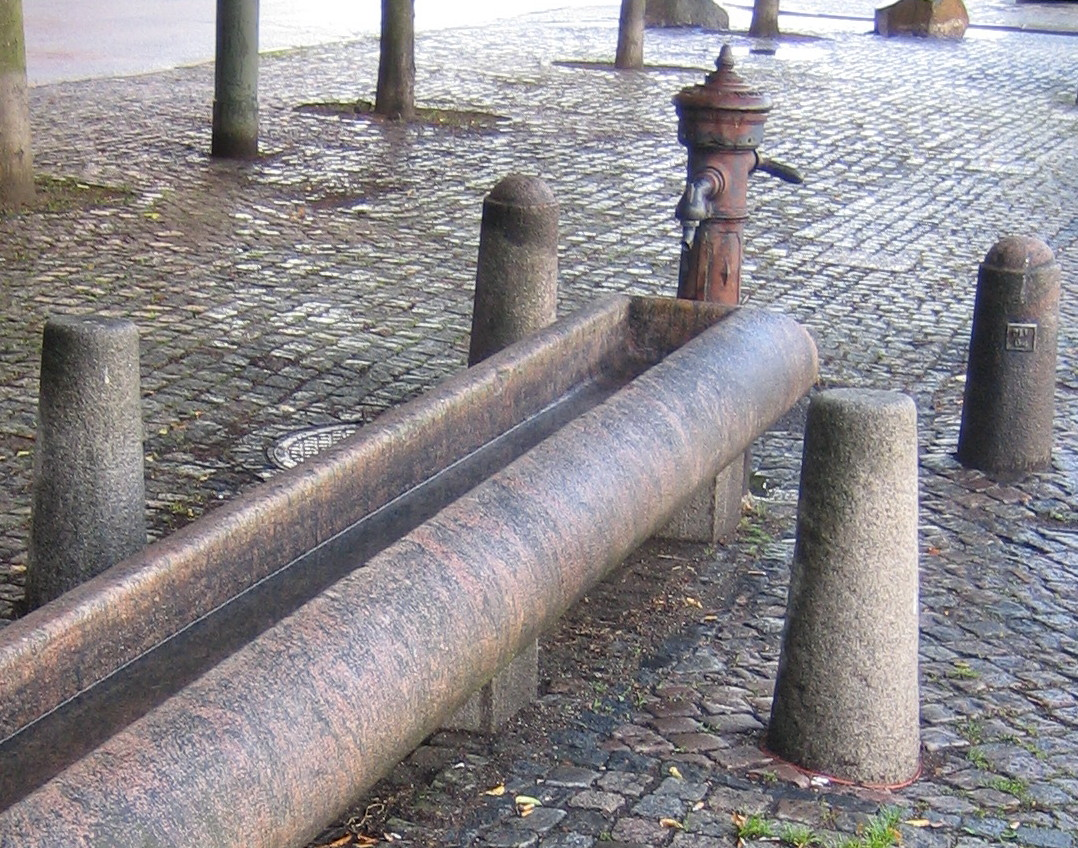
Old water pump

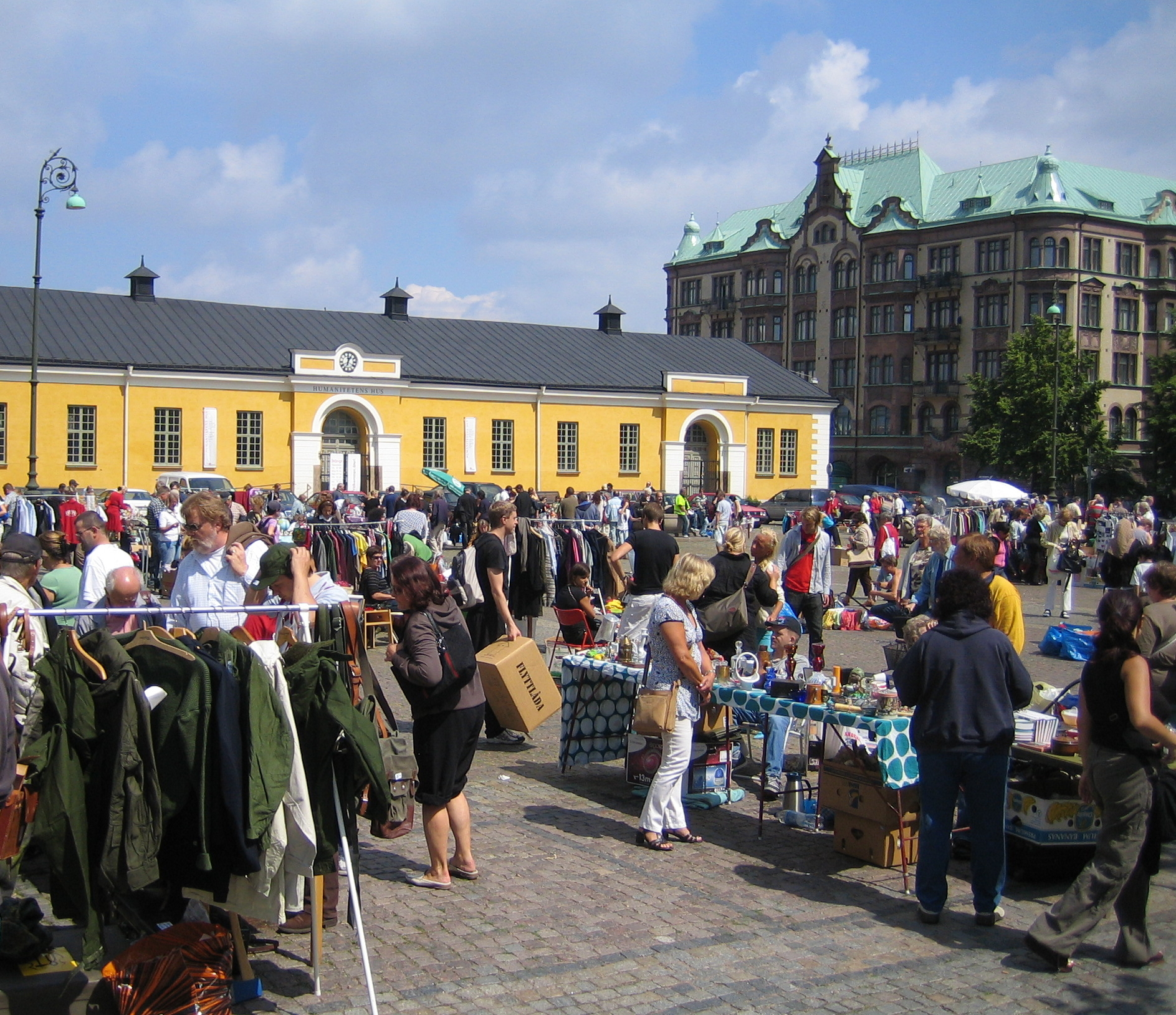
Flea market being held on Drottningtorget
