= Malmö Lokaltrafik =

Defunct bus company in Malmö, Sweden

Malmö Lokaltrafik (ML) was a public transport bus company operating in the municipality and city of Malmö, Sweden. It was formed from the bus services of City of Malmö tramways (MSS) in the 1970s as the tram network in Malmö was being closed.

In 1989 a completely new route network and schedule was introduced and received harsh criticism from the public. The tight schedule was often impossible to keep, thereby causing significant delays. This forced a lot of changes both in routes and schedules.

In 1993, Malmö Lokaltrafik was sold to the private company Linjebuss, because it was decided to let the actual operation and ownership of buses be done by private companies. As part of this deal Linjebuss was also awarded the initial contract for the city bus operations. The brand name for the buses became Länstrafiken Malmöhus, which was still owned by the regional assembly. Later the brand name was changed to Skånetrafiken, which continues to run Malmö's city bus network to this day.

The corporation Malmö Lokaltrafik had its assets moved to other entities but continued to exist legally, and was later involved in a shell company scheme.
