= Nydala, Malmö =

Nydala
- Neighbourhood
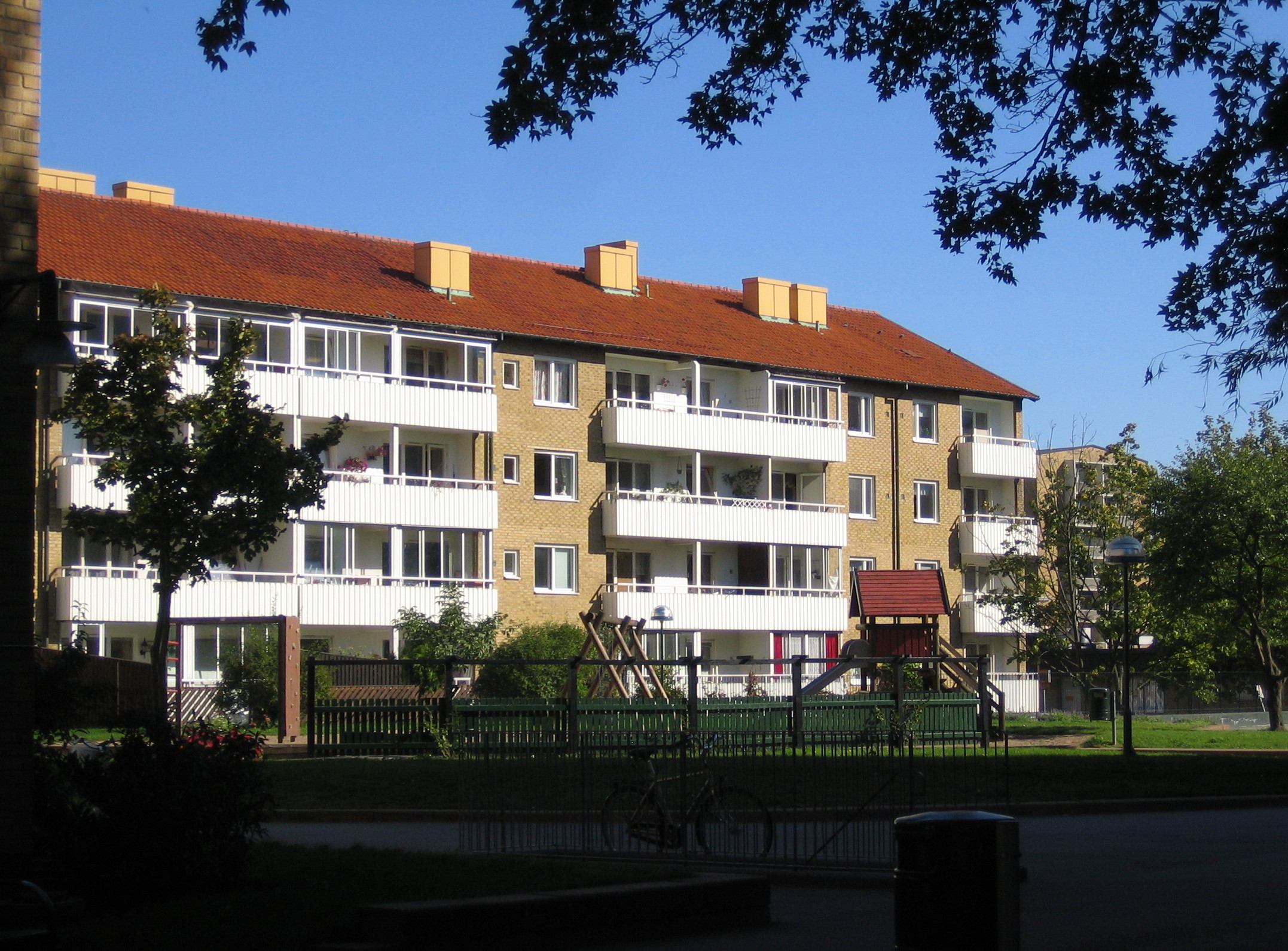
- Interactive map of Nydala
- Coordinates: 55°34′18″N 13°01′01″E
- Country: Sweden
- Province: Skåne
- County: Skåne County
- Municipality: Malmö Municipality
- Borough of Malmö: Fosie

Population (1 January 2011)
  - Total: 5,817
- Time zone: UTC+1 (CET)
  - Summer (DST): UTC+2 (CEST)

Nydala is a neighbourhood of Malmö, situated in the Borough of Fosie, Malmö Municipality, Skåne County, Sweden. In its 2017 report, Police in Sweden placed the district in the most severe category of urban areas with high crime rates.
