= Holma =

Scientific classification
- Kingdom: Animalia
- Phylum: Arthropoda
- Subphylum: Chelicerata
- Class: Arachnida
- Order: Araneae
- Infraorder: Araneomorphae
- Family: Linyphiidae
- Genus: Holma; Locket, 1974
- Species: H. bispicata

Binomial name
- Holma bispicata Locket, 1974

Genus of spiders

Holma is a monotypic genus of Central African dwarf spiders containing the single species, Holma bispicata. It was first described by G. H. Locket in 1974, and has only been found in Angola.
