= Bunkeflo =

Bunkeflo can related to:

- Bunkeflo FF, a Swedish football club located in Bunkeflostrand
- Bunkeflo IF, a former Swedish football club based in Malmö, Sweden
- IF Limhamn Bunkeflo (women), a Swedish women's football club based in Malmö, Sweden
- IF Limhamn Bunkeflo (men) a Swedish football club based in Malmö, Sweden
- Limhamn-Bunkeflo, a former city district in the west and south of Malmö Municipality, Sweden
