= Kirseberg =

- Former city district
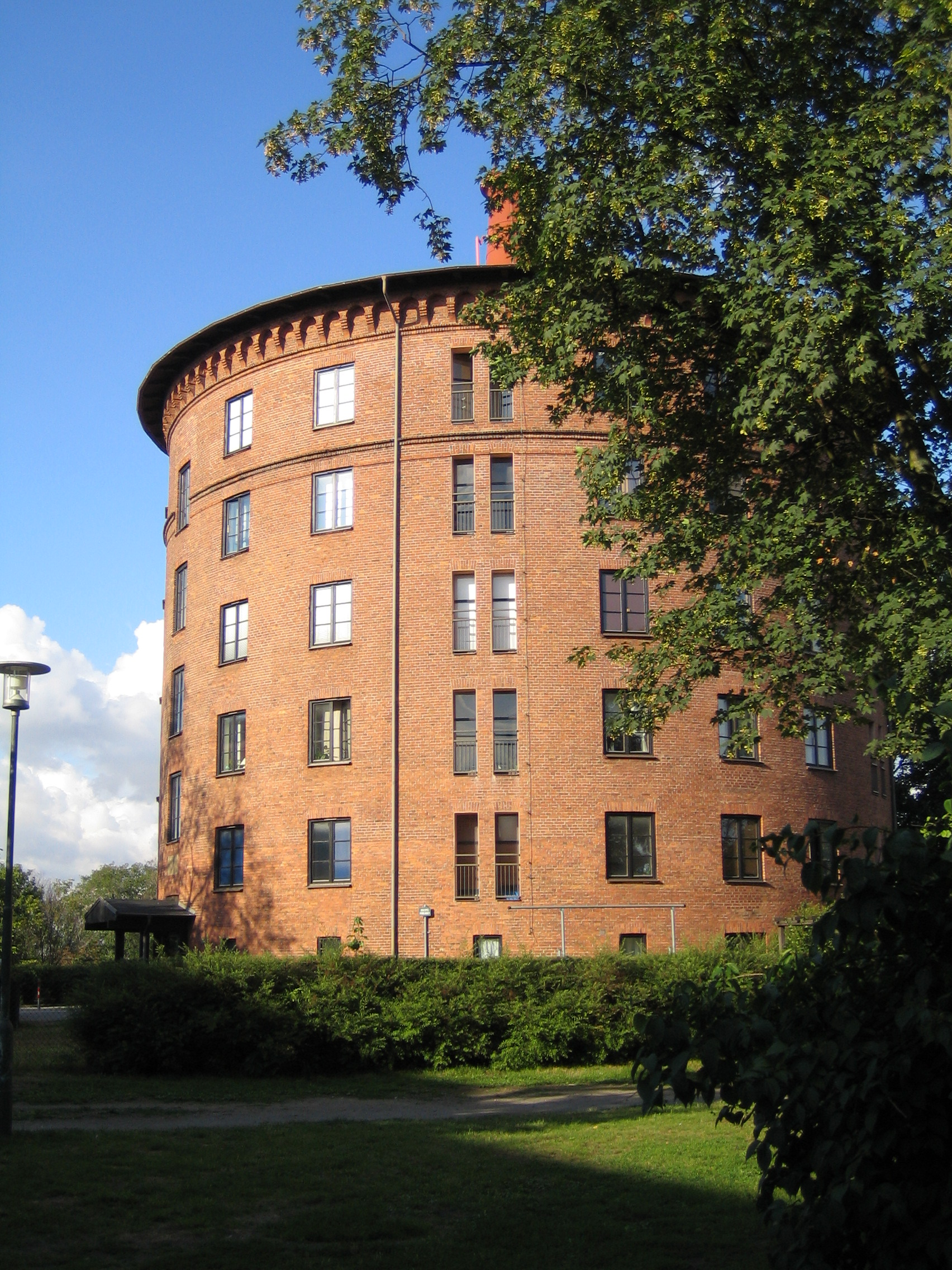
- The old watertower.

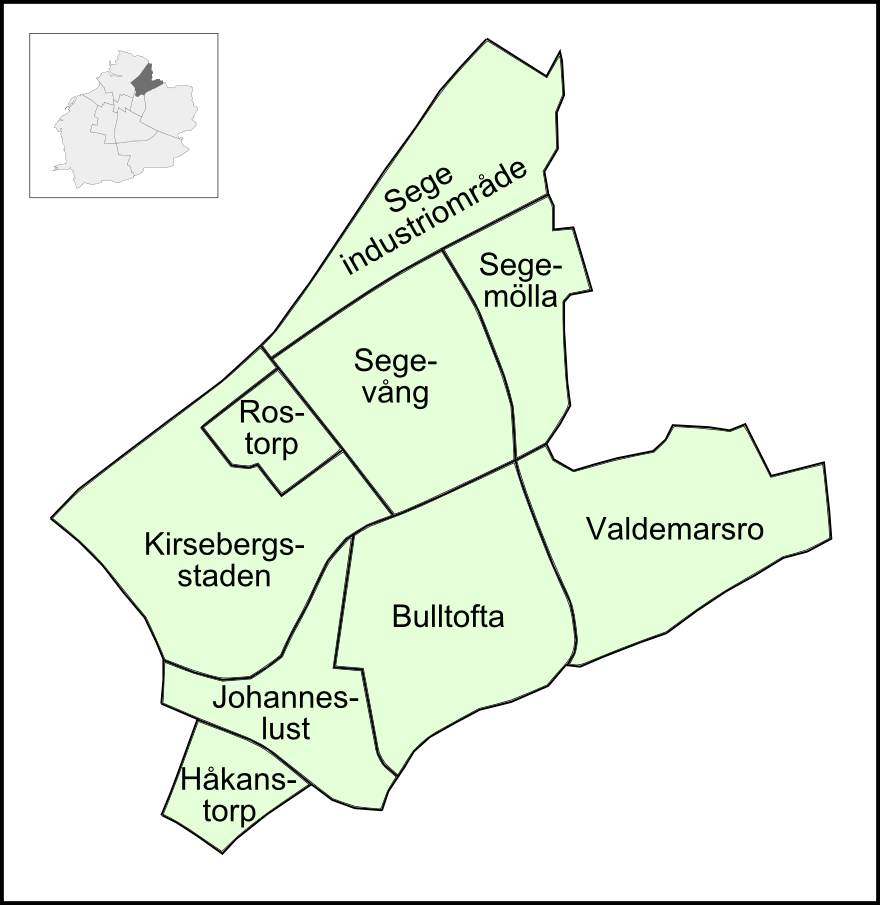
- Kirseberg's neighbourhoods
- Country: Sweden
- Province: Scania
- County: Skåne County
- Municipality: Malmö Municipality

Area
  - Total: 640 ha (1,600 acres)

Population (2012)
  - Total: 14,959
  - Density: 2,300/km^{2} (6,100/sq mi)
- Time zone: UTC+01:00 (CET)
  - Summer (DST): UTC+02:00 (CEST)

Kirseberg (literally "Cherry hill") was a city district (Swedish: stadsdel) in the north of Malmö Municipality, Sweden. On 1 July 2013, it was merged with Centrum, forming Norr. In 2012, Kirseberg had a population of 14,959 of the municipality's 307,758. Its area was 640 hectares.

After World War I, many large tenement buildings were built in haste, often without sewers, and Kirseberg's water tower was quickly converted to housing to reduce the acute housing shortage. Most of Malmö's poor families lived here. In Kirseberg, especially in Kirsebergsstaden, one finds larger apartment buildings side by side with small, low town houses built when country villagers moved closer to the city in the beginning of the 20th century.

The Church of Kirseberg is an active part of the neighbourhood and each year arranges Backanatten ("The Hill Night"), a cultural event featuring theatre plays, music performances and other activities for children.

Kirseberg managed to survive urban renewal between the 1930s and 1980s, so the area's historic charm is well preserved.

== Neighbourhoods ==
The neighbourhoods of Kirseberg were:

- Bulltofta
- Håkanstorp
- Johanneslust
- Kirsebergsstaden
- Rostorp
- Sege industriområde
- Segemölla
- Segevång
- Valdemarsro

== Demographics ==
28% of the population is born abroad, which is the same as the Malmö average.

The ten largest groups of foreign-born persons are:

1. Iraq (525)
2. (Socialist Federal Republic of Yugoslavia) Former Yugoslavia (424)
3. Denmark (393)
4. Poland (391)
5. Bosnia and Herzegovina (343)
6. Hungary (144)
7. Iran (142)
8. Lebanon (95)
9. Germany (90)
10. Romania (86)
