= Kirsebergsstaden =

- Neighbourhood
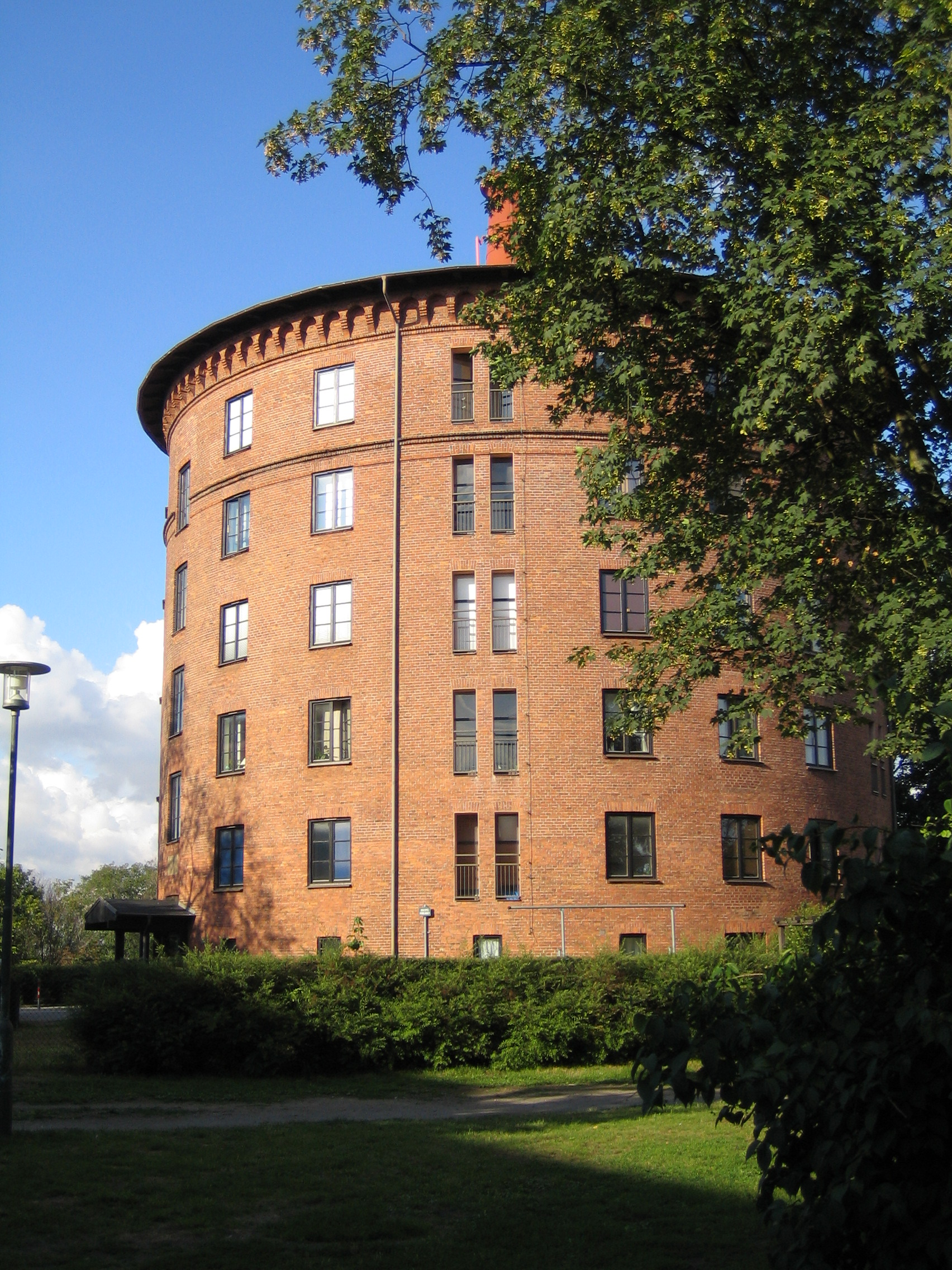
- Interactive map of Kirsebergsstaden
- Coordinates: 55°36′32″N 13°02′27″E
- Country: Sweden
- Province: Skåne
- County: Skåne County
- Municipality: Malmö Municipality
- Borough of Malmö: Kirseberg

Population (2021)
  - Total: 5,309
- Time zone: UTC+1 (CET)
  - Summer (DST): UTC+2 (CEST)

Kirsebergsstaden (Swedish pronunciation: [ˈɕɪ̂ʂːɛbærjˌstɑːdɛn]) is a neighbourhood of Malmö, situated in the Borough of Kirseberg, Malmö Municipality, Skåne County, Sweden.
