= Svågertorp =

- Neighbourhood
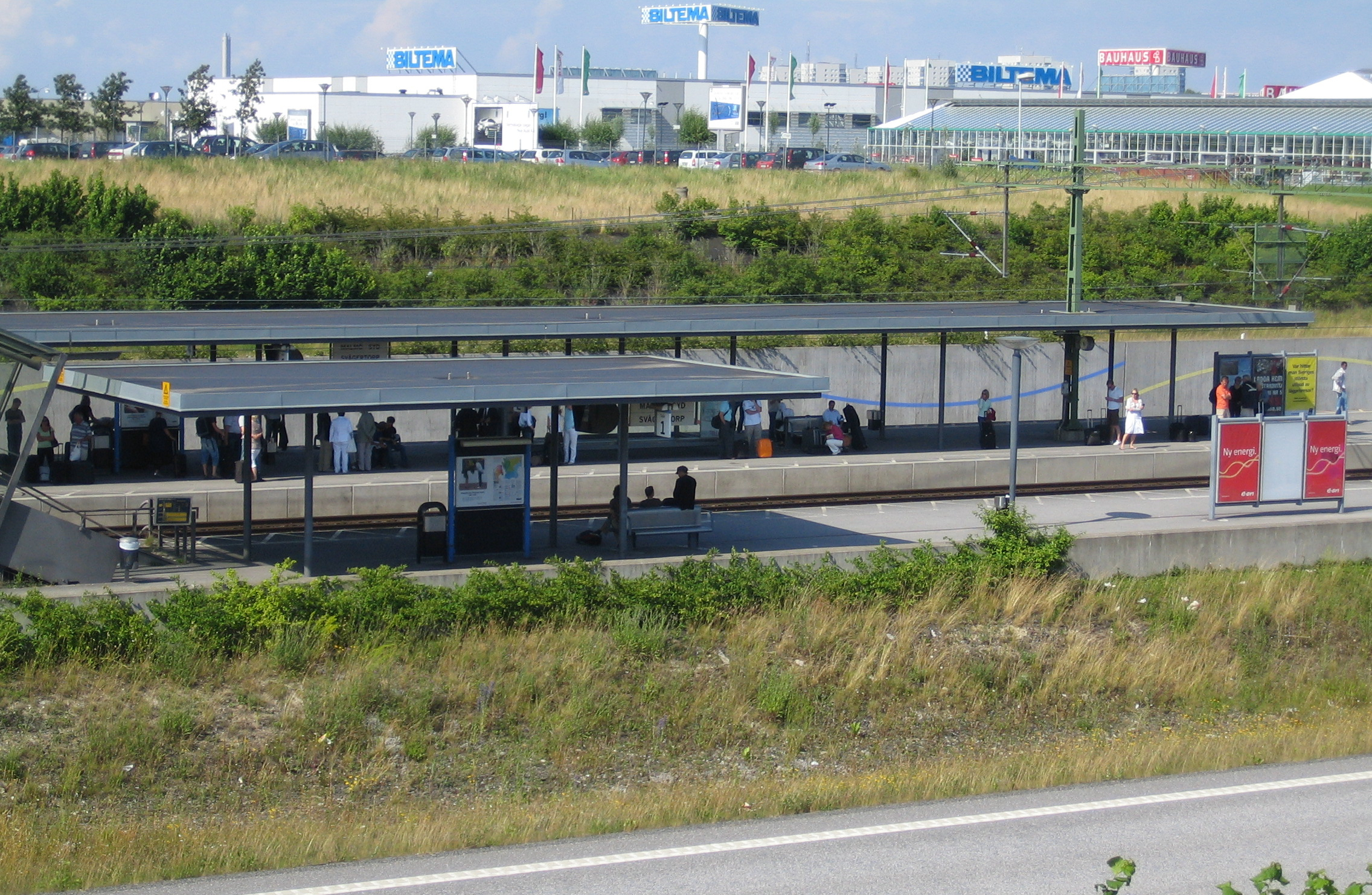
- Svågertorp railway station
- Interactive map of Svågertorp
- Coordinates: 55°33′00″N 12°59′29″E
- Country: Sweden
- Province: Skåne
- County: Skåne County
- Municipality: Malmö Municipality
- Borough of Malmö: Hyllie

Population (1 January 2011)
  - Total: 0
- Time zone: UTC+1 (CET)
  - Summer (DST): UTC+2 (CEST)

Svågertorp is a neighbourhood in Malmö, Sweden. Svågertorp contains the Svågertorp railway station and a large shopping area having IKEA, Siba, Bauhaus, Mediamarkt, and similar other stores. The IKEA store in Svågertorp is 44 000 square meters large.

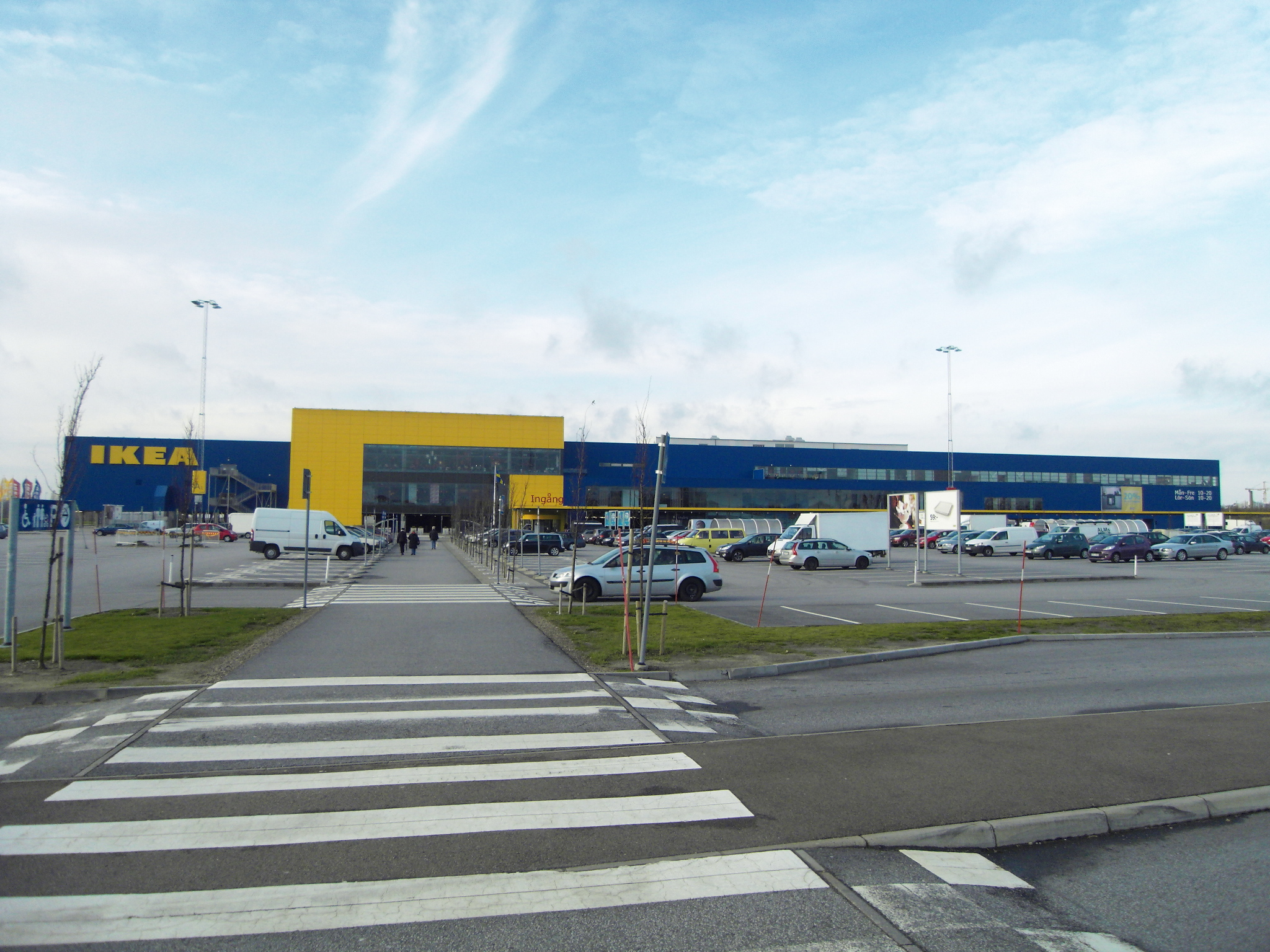
The IKEA store in Svågertorp.
