= Södervärn =

- Neighbourhood
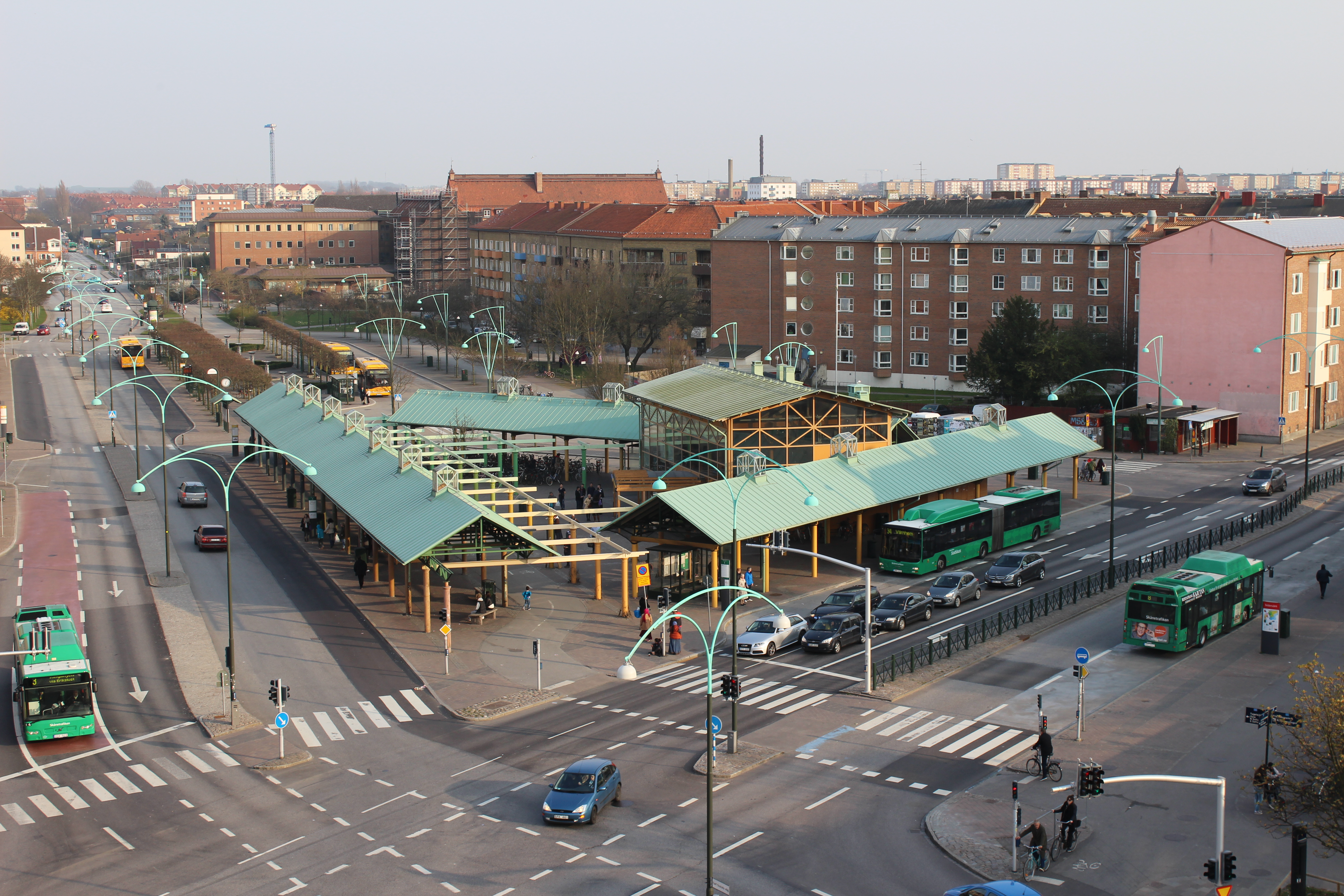
- Södervärn bus station
- Interactive map of Södervärn
- Coordinates: 55°35′13″N 13°00′29″E
- Country: Sweden
- Province: Skåne
- County: Skåne County
- Municipality: Malmö Municipality
- Borough of Malmö: Södra Innerstaden

Population (2021)
  - Total: 1,555
- Time zone: UTC+1 (CET)
  - Summer (DST): UTC+2 (CEST)

Södervärn (Swedish pronunciation: [sœdɛrˈvæːɳ]) is a neighbourhood of Malmö, situated in the Borough of Södra Innerstaden, Malmö Municipality, Skåne County, Sweden.

Södervärn is home to a bus station of the same name, serving as a major interchange for both regional and city buses.
