= Gustav Adolfs torg, Malmö =

Square in Sweden

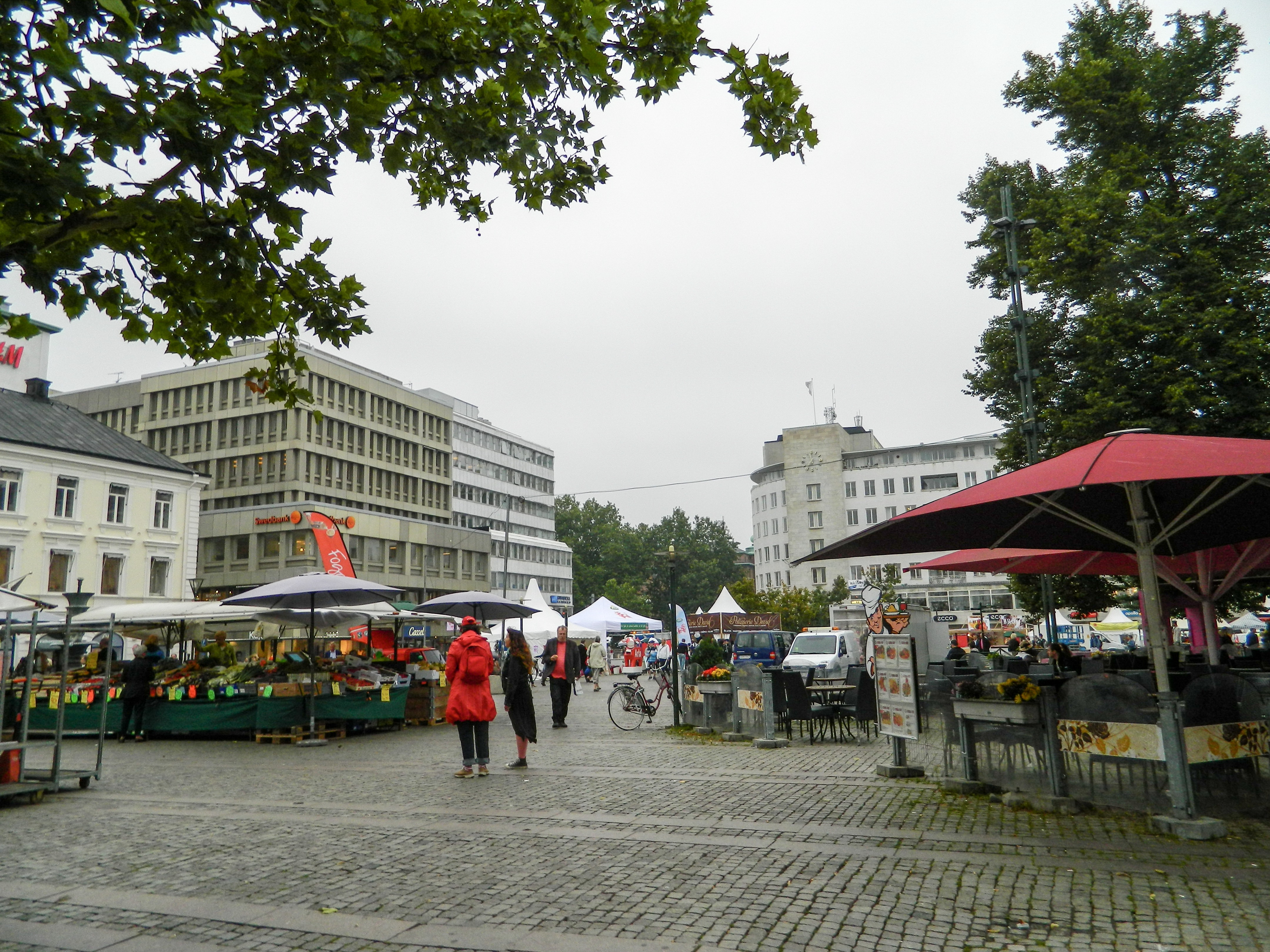
- Gustav Adolfs torg, Malmö. (2011)
- Interactive map of the Gustav Adolfs torg, Malmö area

General information
- Coordinates: 55°36′09″N 13°00′01″E

Gustav Adolfs torg is a public square located in Malmö, Sweden. It is a large park-like square (colloquially often called "Gustav") located in central Malmö between Stortorget and Triangeln. West of the square is the Old Cemetery where many prominent Malmö residents have their graves.

The square is named after Gustav IV Adolf who resided in Malmö between 11 November 1806 and 11 May 1807. The city functioned during that period as Sweden's capital.

Horsecar traffic began in 1887, passing by the square. When it was electrified in 1906–07, the center of tram traffic in the city was moved from Stortorget to Gustav Adolfs torg, within reach of most of the tram lines. The square has served as a central point for public transit ever since and it continues serving this purpose today for the city bus network of Malmö. The last tram line, line 4, Gustav Adolfs torg - Limhamn/Sibbarp, was closed in 1973.

One of the most famous buildings is the old Malmö Theater, of which only the facade is preserved. It is a neoclassical building, which now houses, among other things, H&M. Until 1972, the famous patisserie Brauns conditori was located on the square.

== History ==
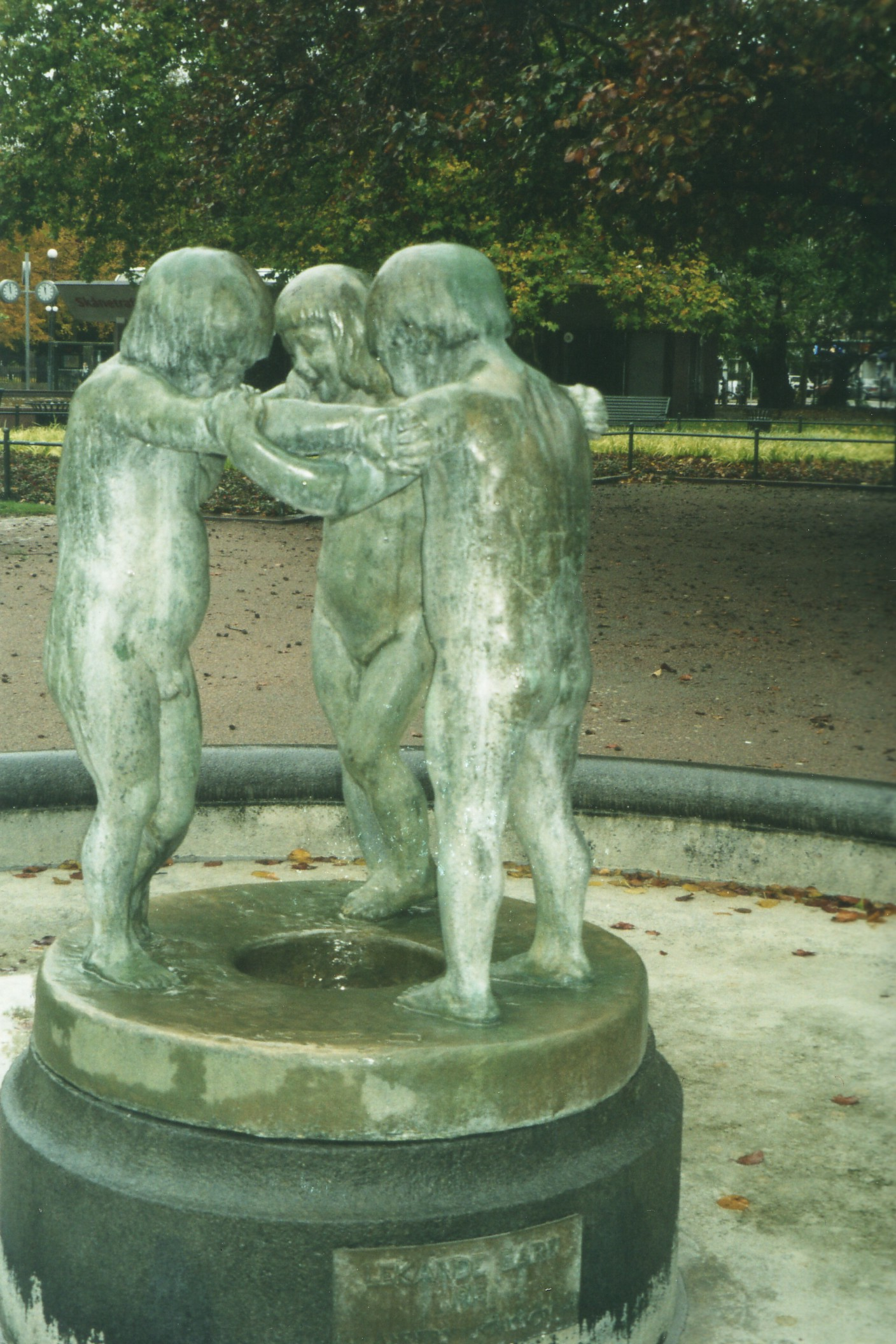
Lekande barn ("Playful Children "), sculpture by artist Anders Jönsson from 1913, .

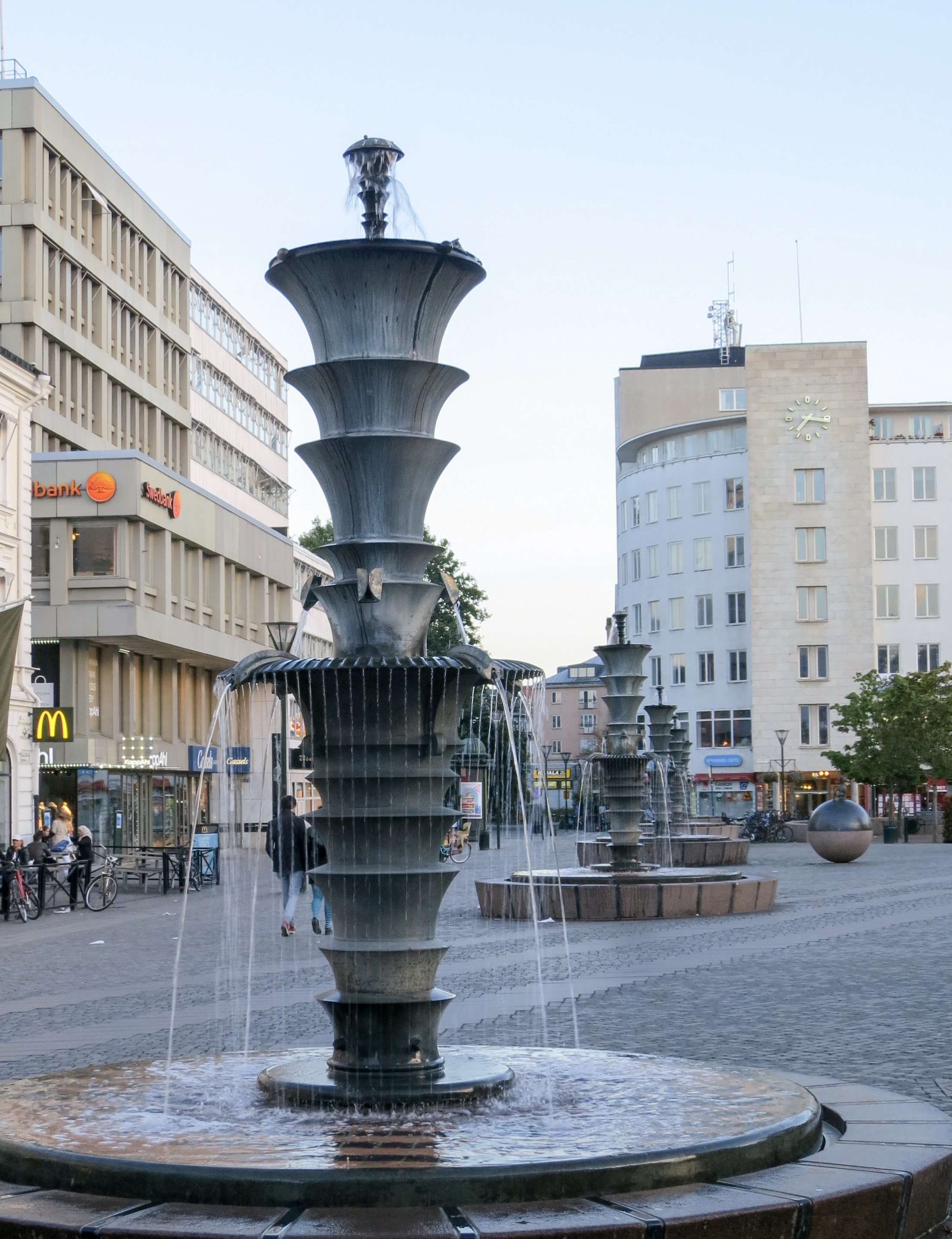
Fem fontäner och ett klot ("Five fountains and a sphere"), fountain by artist Sivert Lindblom from 1999–2000.

During the time of the Gustavians Malmö gained a more prominent position than the city had ever had under previous Swedish regents. Mainly thanks to Gustav IV Adolf, who was very committed to Malmö's development.

In 1804, Gustav IV Adolf decided that the fortifications around Malmö would be demolished. Nils Mannerskantz, who was the director of fortifications, drew up a plan for the demolition project. A lot changed. Canals were dug, wetlands were drained, altering the medieval scale of the city. City blocks were straightened and tree-lined promenades created, as well as two squares, Gustav Adolfs Torg and Drottningtorget. The idea with Gustav Adolfs torg was to create a central representative place for the new district, which was intended to grow from where the defense ramparts had been.

In the 1910s, Gustav Adolfs torg had no artistic decoration and the Malmö beautification and planting association received a gift from Malmö resident Eugen Wingård to find a suitable work of art. The choice fell on the artist Anders Jönsson's sculpture Lekande Barn (Playful Children), which was placed there in 1914. It stands today in the middle of the square and has over the years become one of Malmö's most beloved works of art.

West of the square is the Old Cemetery. It was included in Mannerskantz's plan, as the city's cemeteries had become too small. The square still retains its function, even though several changes have been made since it was first laid out. In the middle of the 19th century, a planting Rundning was arranged, which was characterized by the combination of square and park. From 1934, trees were planted on the square and the Öresund fountain (1926) in bronze by the Swedish-Danish sculptor Gerhard Henning (1880–1967) was erected in 1934 on the western part of the square.

The most recent change took place in 1997 and was designed by Sven-Ingvar Andersson, landscape architect. He placed low pillar lights and walls of granite in circles. It recreates the basic shape of the square into different spaces. A nice effect was achieved by making the walls level across the entire square.

Södergatan and Södra Förstadsgatan are connected over the paved eastern part of the square. There, too, is the sculptural group Fem fontäner och ett klot (Five fountains and a sphere) by Sivert Lindblom, as well as space for market stalls. A new bus office and a restaurant designed by Ib Rasmussen were also built.

Today, many of Malmö's oldest and largest buildings can be found around the square. At the northern part is a row of white houses called "Rivieran" (the Riviera) and was designed with the French Neo-Renaissance look. In the southern part of the square is another well-known building called the "Valhalla Palace" and was built at the beginning of the 20th century. The palace was designed by Alfred Arwidius, a Malmö architect who was inspired by North American architecture. One of Malmö's foremost modernist buildings is the so-called "Trygghuset", designed by Erik Lallerstedt in 1938. Just in front of the Trygghuset there is a planting with young trees. The place is called Kungalunden (The King's grove) and was a present to King Carl XVI Gustaf on his 50th birthday.

The 1992 UEFA European Football Championship was hosted by Sweden, and some of it by Malmö. Riots occurred, also in Gustav Adolfs torg. This caused the British Secretary of State for Culture, Media and Sport, David Mellor, to make a visit.

Renovations of the square and the surrounding area began in September 2022, with the final projects planned to be completed by April 2028.
