= Värnhem =

Neighbourhood of Malmö, Sweden

- Neighbourhood
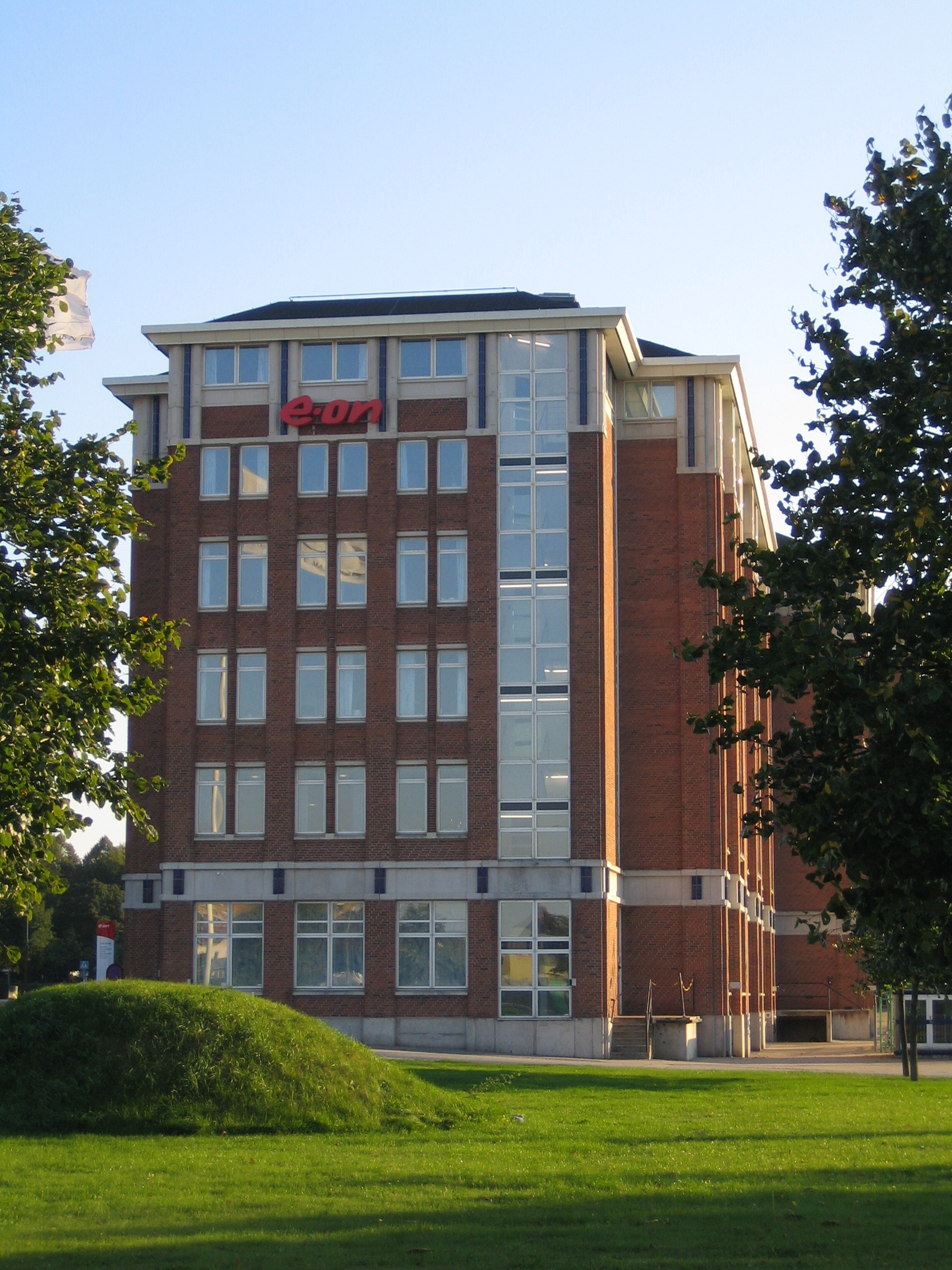
- E.ON office building in Värnhem
- Interactive map of Värnhem
- Coordinates: 55°36′07″N 13°01′21″E
- Country: Sweden
- Province: Skåne
- County: Skåne County
- Municipality: Malmö Municipality
- Borough of Malmö: Centrum

Population (2021)
  - Total: 3,886
- Time zone: UTC+1 (CET)
  - Summer (DST): UTC+2 (CEST)

Värnhem is a neighbourhood of Malmö, situated in the Borough of Centrum, Malmö Municipality, Skåne County, Sweden. The neighbourhood gives its name to Värnhemstorget, however the square is actually located in the adjacent neighbourhood Rörsjöstaden.
