= Kristineberg =

Kristineberg may refer to:

== Localities ==
- Kristineberg, Lycksele, a village in Lycksele Municipality, Sweden
- Kristineberg, Malmö, a village in Malmö Municipality, Sweden
- Kristineberg, Oskarshamn, a city district in Oskarshamn, Sweden
- Kristineberg, Stockholm, a city district in Stockholm, Sweden

== Constructions ==
- Kristineberg Palace, a former residence in Stockholm
- Kristineberg Metro Station, a metro station in Stockholm
