= Studvest =

Norwegian student newspaper

- Front page for 20 August 2007
- Type: Student newspaper
- Format: Tabloid (compact)
- Owner(s): Student Welfare Organisation Sammen
- Editor: Even Hammersvik
- Founded: 1945
- Headquarters: Bergen, Norway
- Circulation: 8,500
- Website: studvest.no

Studvest is a weekly student newspaper published in Bergen, Norway, with a circulation of 8,500.

The newspaper covers the University of Bergen, Bergen University College and the Norwegian School of Economics and Business Administration as well as small colleges such as Bergen National Academy of the Arts and Bergen School of Architecture. It is published by a volunteer editorial office subordinate to the Student Welfare Organisation Sammen.

The newspaper's first edition was published on 20 November 1945, under the name Ånd og Vilje. In 1961 it changed name to Stud.Vest, that was later shortened to the present Studvest. Ånd og Vilje was primarily a debate forum, and was first published in a regular newspaper format in 1973. It became a weekly publication in 1995.
