= Käglingeparken =

Park in Malmö, Sweden

Coordinates: 55°31′03″N 13°3′56″E

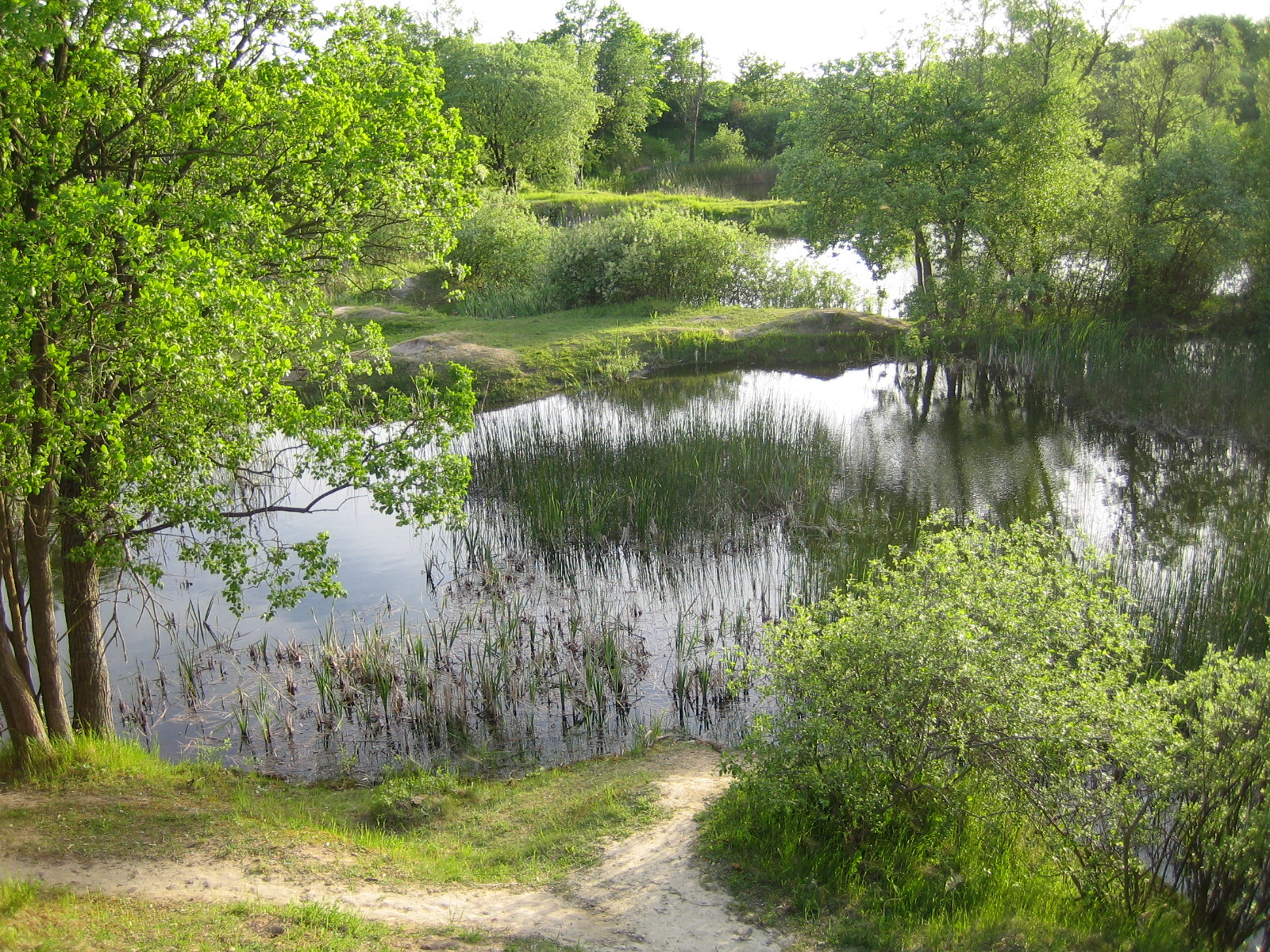
Käglingeparken

Käglingeparken is a park in Malmö, Sweden.

Käglingeparken ("Käglinge park") is a nature area at Käglinge on the outskirts of Malmö. The area is an old gravel pit that has been converted into a recreational area. Many of Scania's animal and plant species are represented. For example, there are nine different species of frog in ponds in the area. In the spring, the frogs' call drowns out the birdsong.
