= Lindängen =

- Neighbourhood
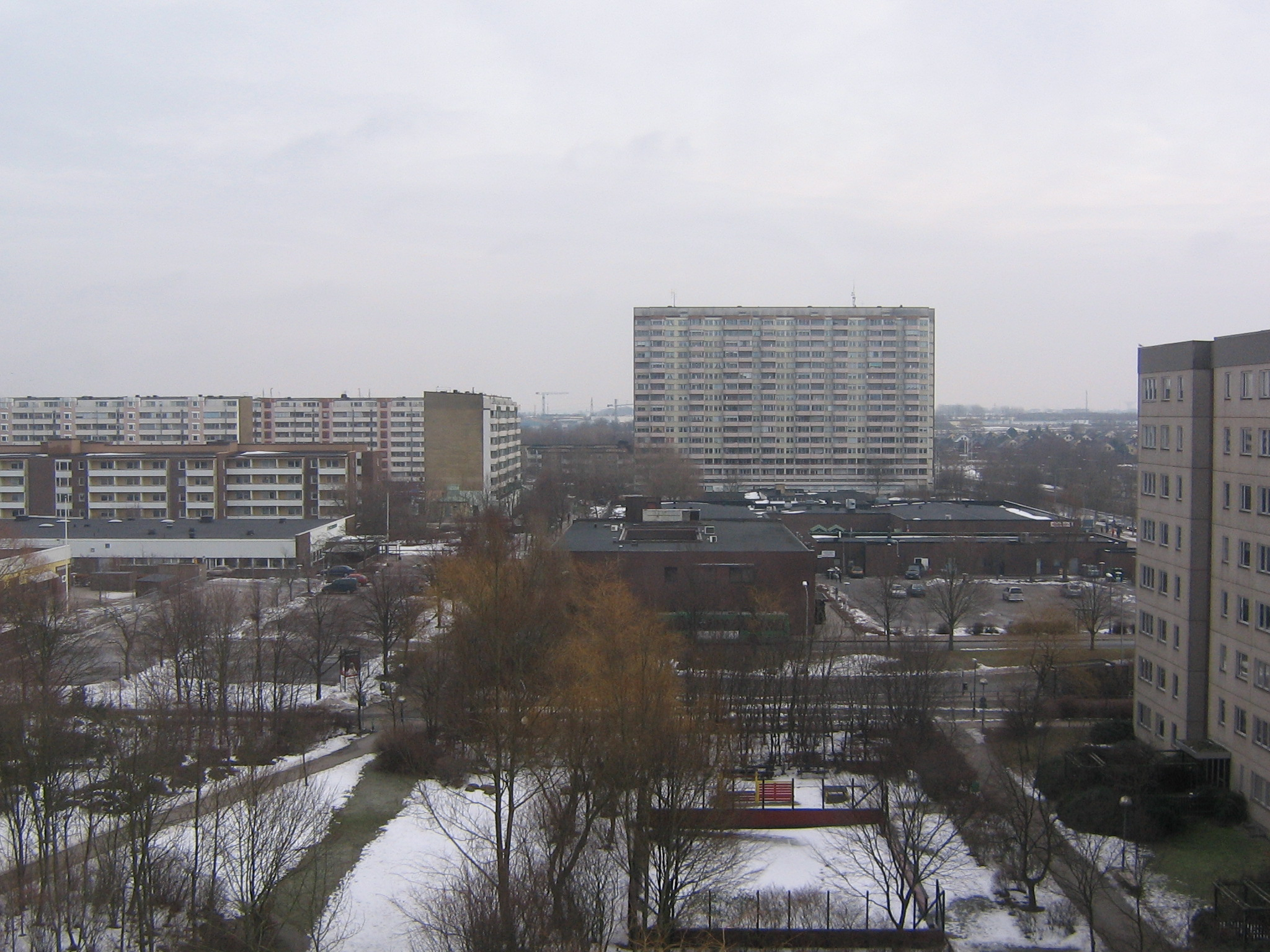
- Interactive map of Lindängen
- Coordinates: 55°33′33″N 13°00′56″E
- Country: Sweden
- Province: Skåne
- County: Skåne County
- Municipality: Malmö Municipality
- Borough of Malmö: Fosie

Population (2014)
  - Total: 6,874
- Time zone: UTC+1 (CET)
  - Summer (DST): UTC+2 (CEST)

Lindängen is a neighbourhood in Söder in Malmö, Sweden. It has 6,874 inhabitants. In its 2017 report, Police in Sweden placed the district in the most severe category of urban areas with high crime rates.

== Demographics ==
Lindängen had 5,958 inhabitants in 2007. It increased to 6,628 in 2011. As of 2014, 6,874 live in the neighbourhood.

== Sports ==
The following sports clubs are located in Lindängen:

- BK Olympic
- HK Malmö

== Notable people ==
The rapper Lazee is from Lindängen.
