= Oxie kyrkby =

- Neighbourhood
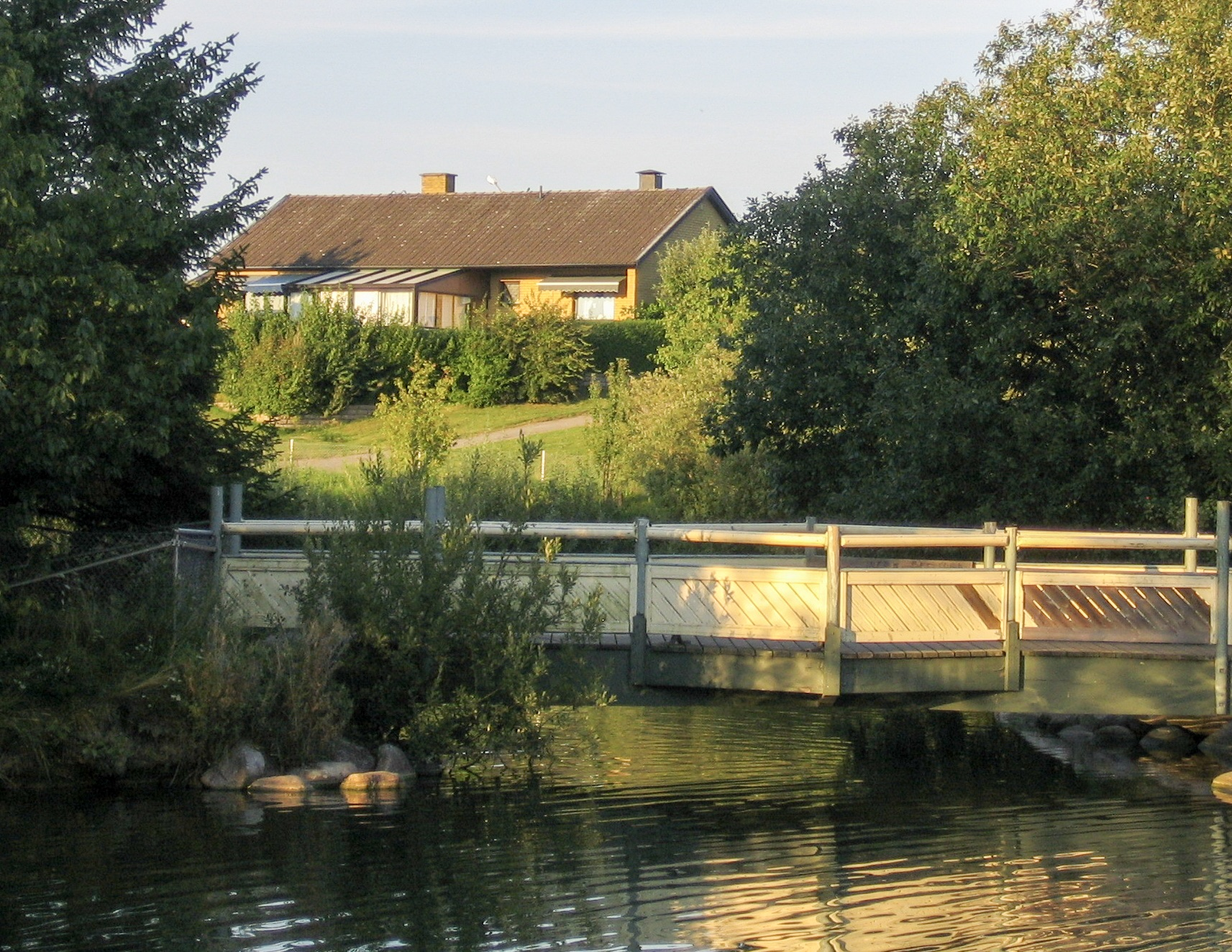
- Interactive map of Oxie kyrkby
- Coordinates: 55°32′55″N 13°05′55″E
- Country: Sweden
- Province: Skåne
- County: Skåne County
- Municipality: Malmö Municipality
- Borough of Malmö: Oxie

Population (1 January 2011)
  - Total: 4,130
- Time zone: UTC+1 (CET)
  - Summer (DST): UTC+2 (CEST)

Oxie kyrkby is a neighbourhood of the Borough of Oxie, Malmö Municipality, Skåne County, Sweden.
