= Toarp, Malmö =

Toarp
- Neighbourhood
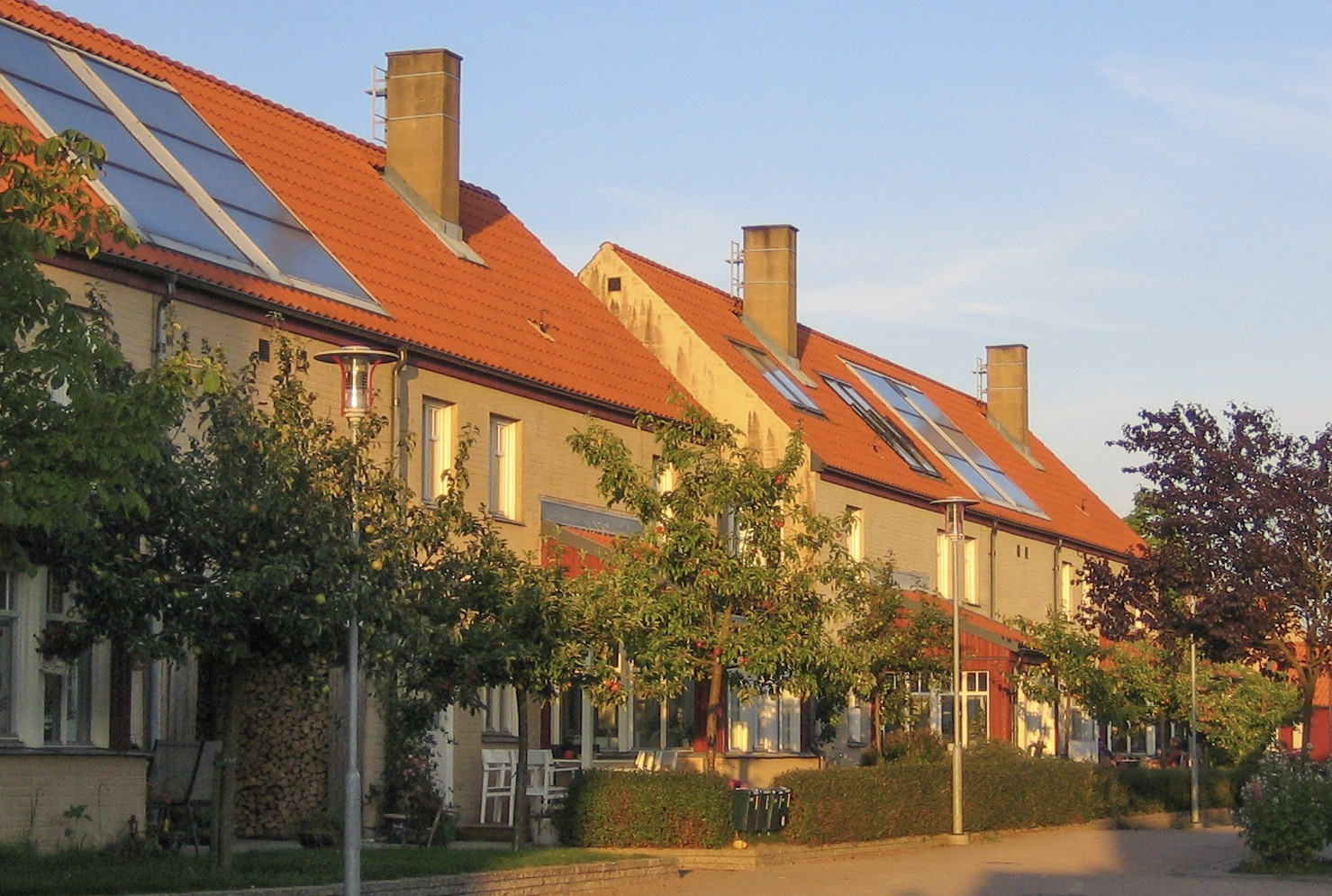
- Interactive map of Toarp
- Coordinates: 55°32′27″N 13°07′21″E
- Country: Sweden
- Province: Skåne
- County: Skåne County
- Municipality: Malmö Municipality
- Borough of Malmö: Oxie

Area
  - Urban: 0.13 km^{2} (0.050 sq mi)

Population (31 December 2010)
  - Neighbourhood: 378
  - Urban: 219
  - Urban density: 1,644/km^{2} (4,260/sq mi)
- Time zone: UTC+1 (CET)
  - Summer (DST): UTC+2 (CEST)

Toarp is a neighbourhood of the Borough of Oxie, Malmö Municipality, Skåne County, Sweden. It was a separate locality until 2015 and had 219 inhabitants in 2010.
