= Gullvik =

Neighbourhood of Malmö, Sweden

- Neighbourhood
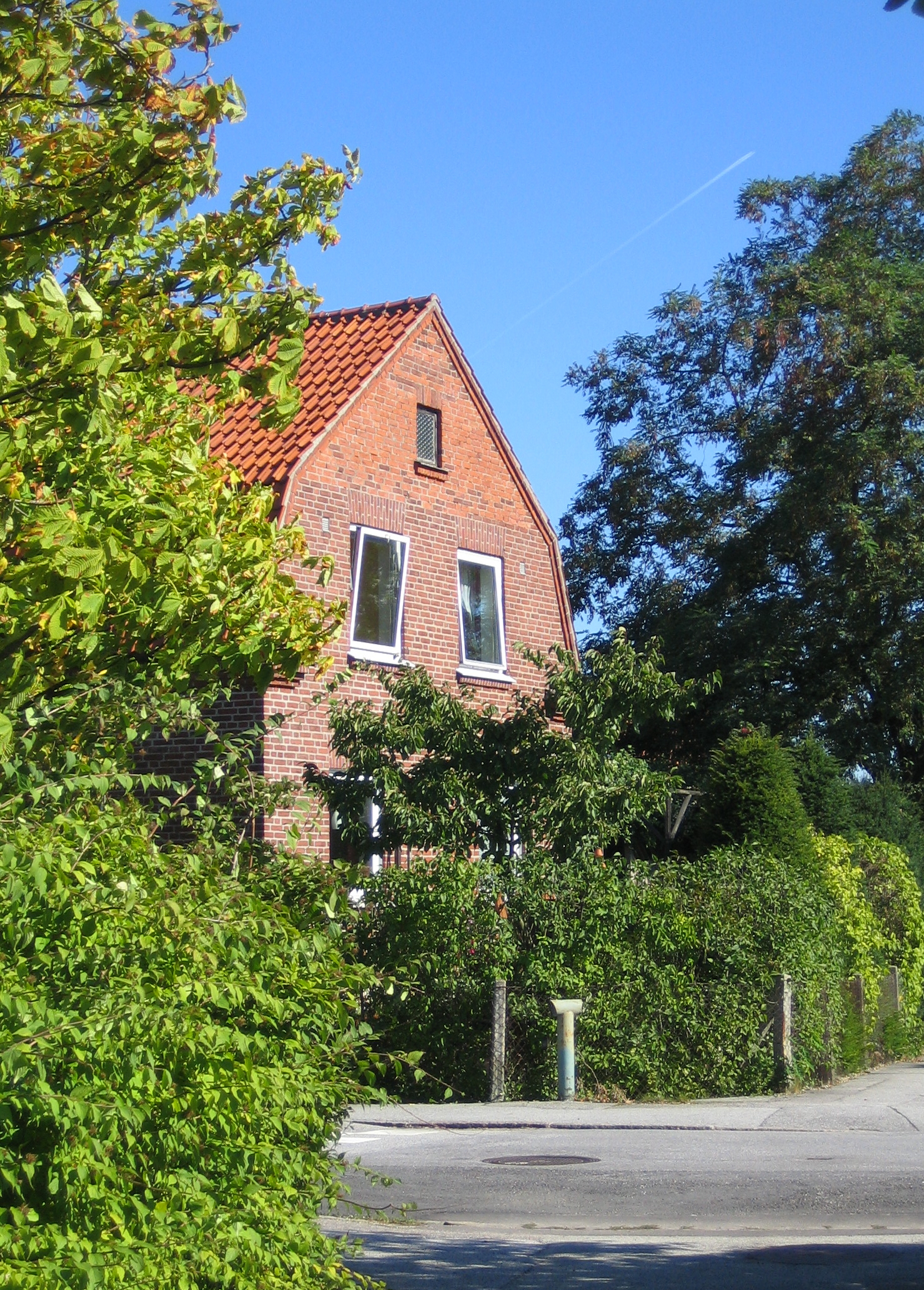
- Interactive map of Gullvik
- Coordinates: 55°34′11″N 13°02′07″E
- Country: Sweden
- Province: Skåne
- County: Skåne County
- Municipality: Malmö Municipality
- Borough of Malmö: Fosie

Population (1 January 2011)
  - Total: 1,353
- Time zone: UTC+1 (CET)
  - Summer (DST): UTC+2 (CEST)

Gullvik is a neighbourhood of Malmö, situated in the Borough of Fosie, Malmö Municipality, Skåne County, Sweden.
