= Fosie =

- Former city district
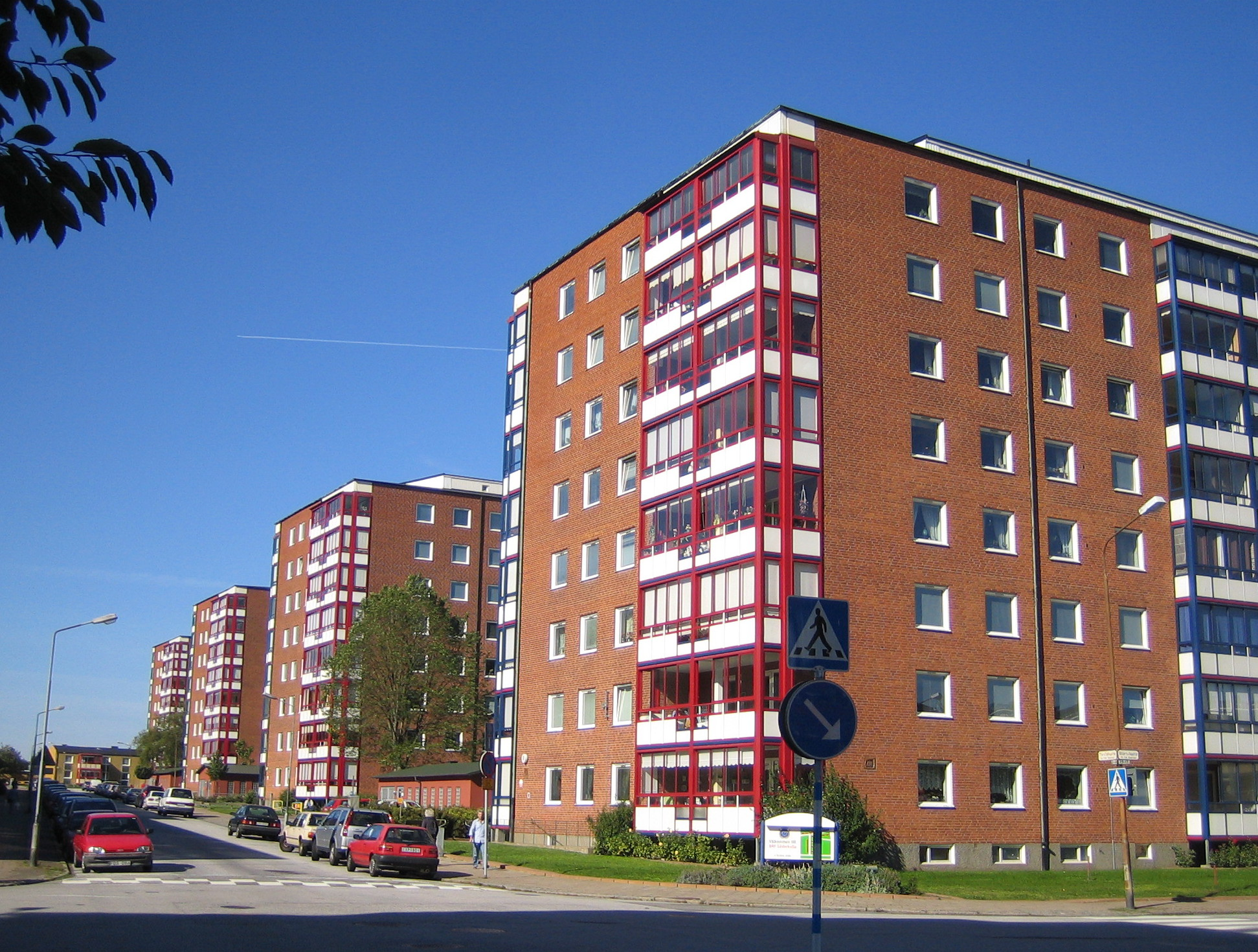
- Söderkulla

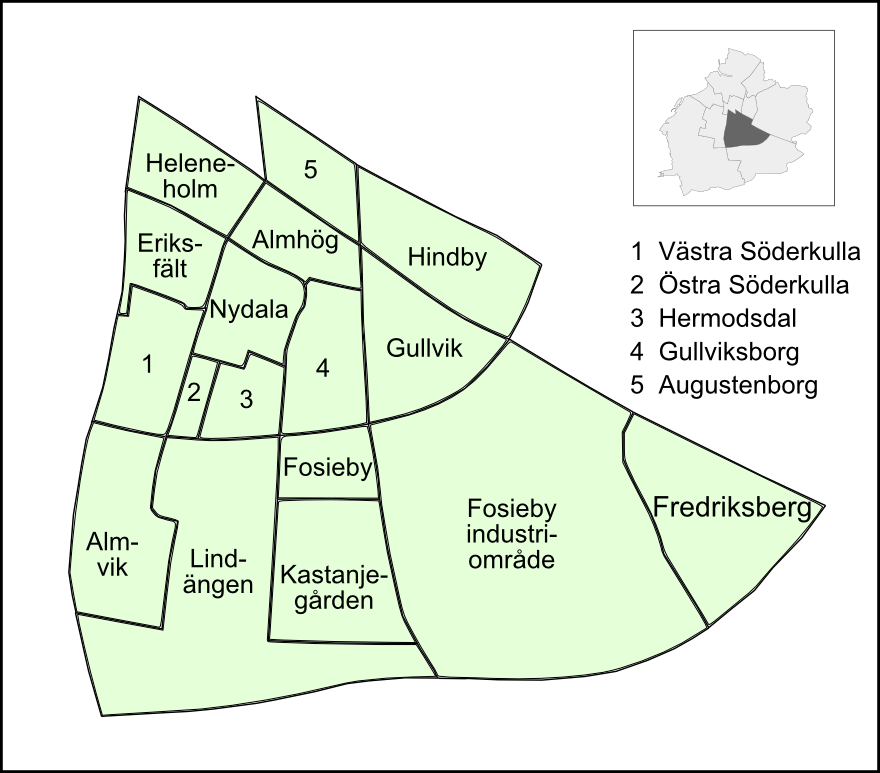
- Fosie's neighbourhoods
- Country: Sweden
- Province: Scania
- County: Skåne County
- Municipality: Malmö Municipality

Area
  - Total: 1,243 ha (3,070 acres)

Population (2012)
  - Total: 43,889
  - Density: 3,531/km^{2} (9,145/sq mi)
- Time zone: UTC+01:00 (CET)
  - Summer (DST): UTC+02:00 (CEST)

Fosie (Swedish pronunciation: [ˈfûːsɪɛ]) was a city district (Swedish: stadsdel) in the central of Malmö Municipality, Sweden. On 1 July 2013, it was merged with the city district of Oxie, forming Söder. In 2012, Fosie had a population of 43,889 of the municipality's 307,758. The area was 1,243 hectares.

The district is largely composed of apartment blocks built in the 1960s. The district covers most of Fosie parish which was incorporated in Malmö 1931. Fosie has many faces: tall buildings and industries, parks and houses with a long history and country houses. Fosie church, stone, and especially many of the housing estate names leads to the past. The future is symbolized by the green roofs at Augustenborg's eco-city of the future industries in Fosie företagarby (literally "Fosie company village") and proximity to new relations with Europe.

Inhabitants in Fosie originate from many countries. There are similar variations in the composition of the population and housing. An important element in the district is the Fosie industrial estate with some 10,000 jobs and 300 businesses.

== Neighbourhoods ==
The neighbourhoods of Fosie were:

- Almhög
- Almvik
- Augustenborg
- Eriksfält
- Fosieby
- Fosieby industriområde
- Fredriksberg
- Gullvik
- Gullviksborg
- Heleneholm
- Hermodsdal
- Hindby
- Kastanjegården
- Lindängen
- Nydala
- Västra Söderkulla
- Östra Söderkulla
