= Lockarp =

- Neighbourhood
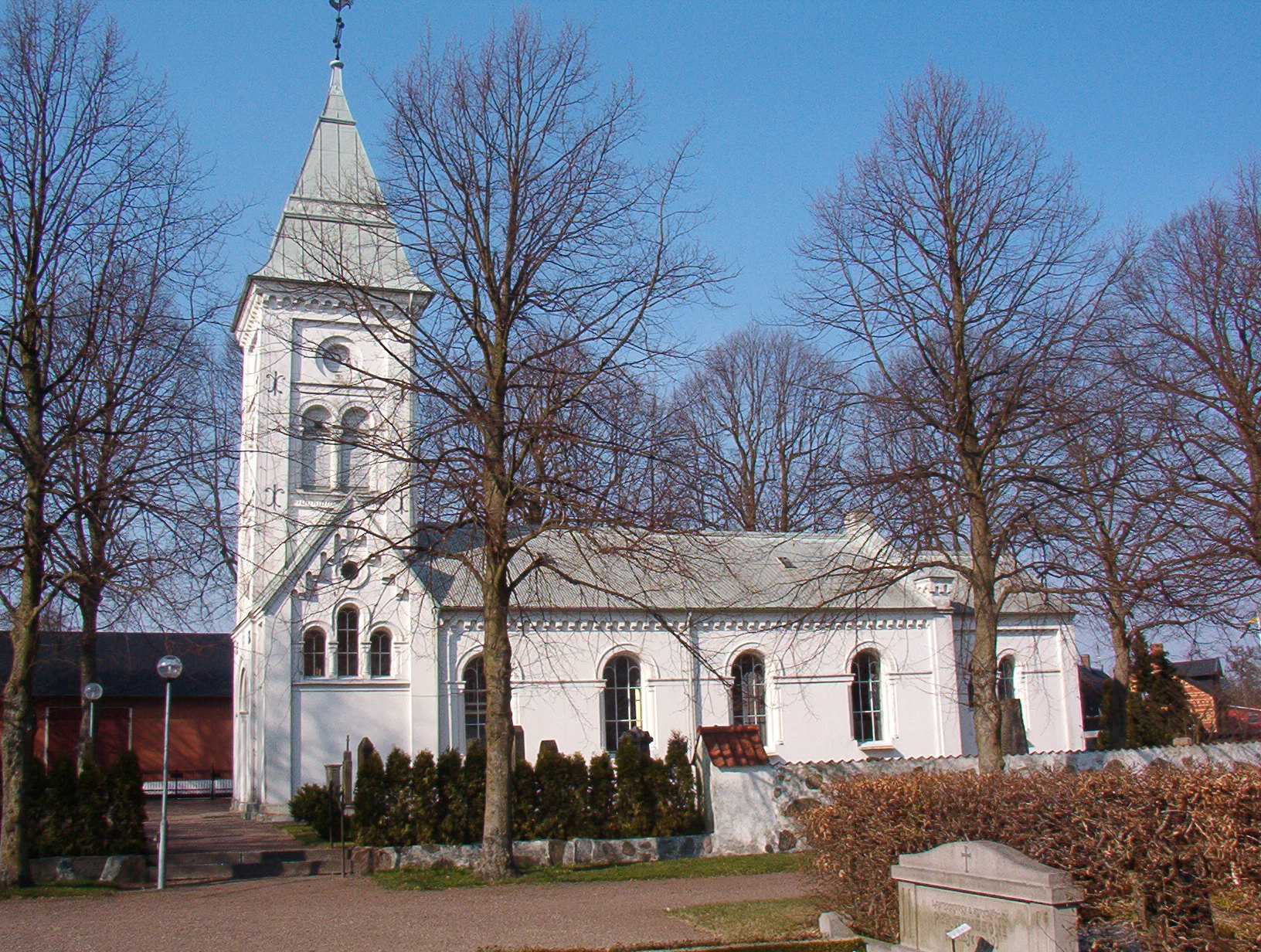
- Lockarp Church
- Interactive map of Lockarp
- Coordinates: 55°32′30″N 13°02′30″E
- Country: Sweden
- Province: Skåne
- County: Skåne County
- Municipality: Malmö Municipality
- Borough of Malmö: Oxie

Population (1 January 2011)
  - Total: 166
- Time zone: UTC+1 (CET)
  - Summer (DST): UTC+2 (CEST)

Lockarp is a neighbourhood of the Borough of Oxie, Malmö Municipality, Skåne County, Sweden.
