= Bergen School of Architecture =

Private architecture school in Bergen, Norway

Coordinates: 60°24′35″N 5°19′19.6″E

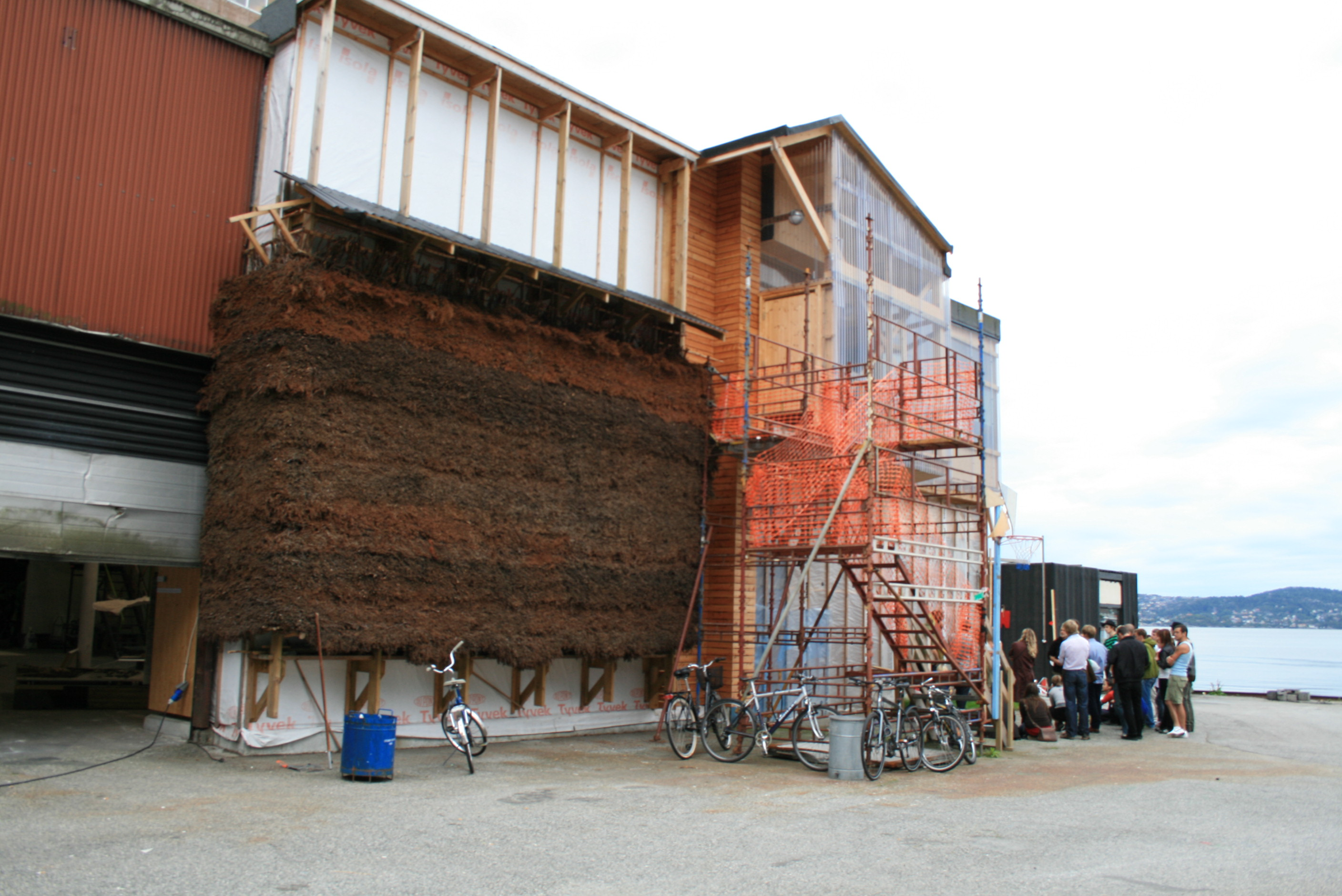

Bergen School of Architecture or BAS (Norwegian: Bergen Arkitekt Skole) is a private and academically independent school located in Bergen, Norway.

BAS offers two master's degree programs: Master of Architecture and Master of Architecture with specialization in Landscape. In the Norwegian context, these two programs stand as alternatives to those offered by the two public architecture schools in Norway (AHO in Oslo and NTNU in Trondheim). BAS programs are accredited by the European Union. BAS is protected by the National Norwegian Law of Alternative Private Education and receives much of its financial support from the Norwegian government.

BAS was formally founded in 1986 (40 years ago) by the initiative of Arch. Prof. Svein Hatløy and the support of the Bergen Association of Architects. S. Hatløy functioned as the academic and administrative principal until 31 August 2007. Architect and city planner Marianne Skjulhaug took over S. Hatløy as the school's academic and administrative principal on 1 September 2007.

The school has approximately 160 students divided into 5 grades. The 5-year-long master's degree programs are divided into two cycles. The first cycle ends with an examination of the works the students have done in the first three grades. The approval of this examination gives the students the right to continue on the second cycle. Even though the school does not offer bachelor's degrees, the approved first cycle at BAS usually is equivalent to a Bachelor of Architecture degree in the EU system. The second cycle at BAS consists of three full-time thematic semester courses and a final 7-months-long diploma project.

In September 2009, at a junction in Fredriksberg, Malmö, students performed an art project called A Sunny Day at Fredriksberg.

== Master courses ==
Amongst the Master courses offered at BAS is a course called "Architect in a foreign culture". These courses take the students to observe as architects in a culture very different from their own and the question is raised how an architect can meet the challenges of understanding foreign cultures and what sort of architectural response it will require. Previously BAS has been to China, India, Brazil and Chimundo in Mozambique.
