= Kungshög, Malmö =

Kungshög
- Neighbourhood
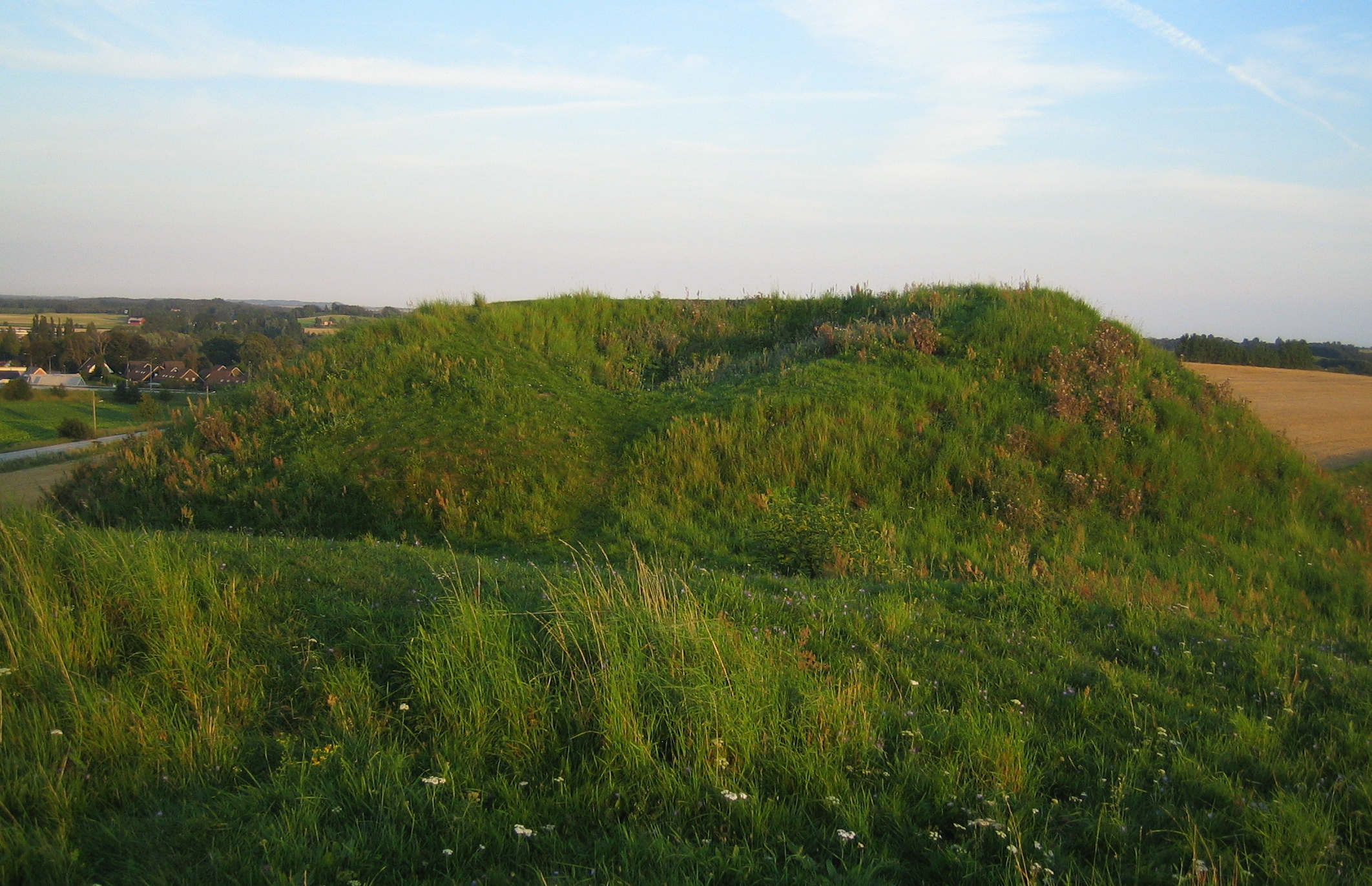
- Interactive map of Kungshög
- Coordinates: 55°33′14″N 13°04′53″E
- Country: Sweden
- Province: Skåne
- County: Skåne County
- Municipality: Malmö Municipality
- Borough of Malmö: Oxie

Population (1 January 2011)
  - Total: 7
- Time zone: UTC+1 (CET)
  - Summer (DST): UTC+2 (CEST)

Kungshög is a neighbourhood of the Borough of Oxie, Malmö Municipality, Skåne County, Sweden.
