= Heleneholm =

- Neighbourhood
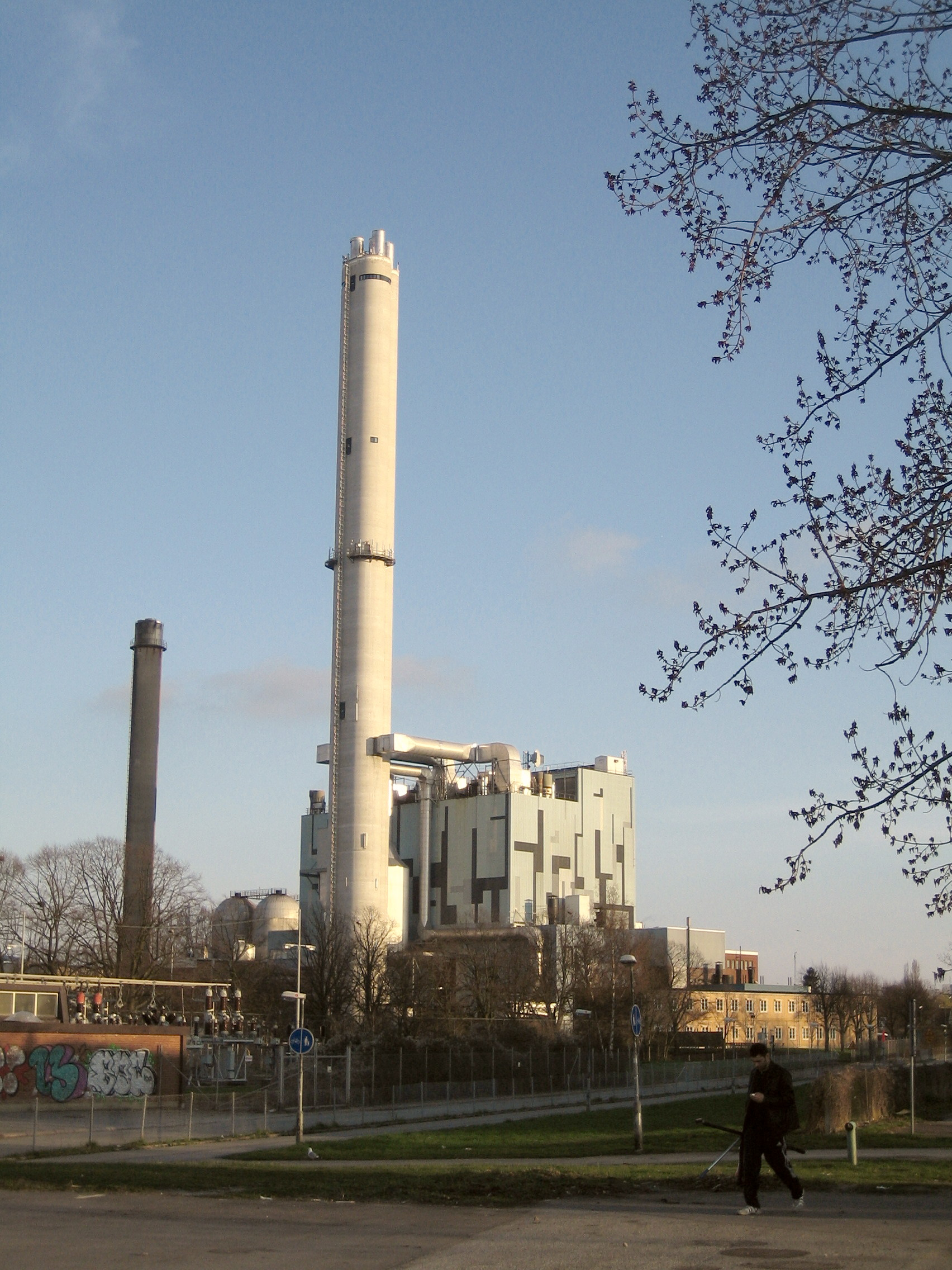
- Interactive map of Heleneholm
- Coordinates: 55°34′44″N 13°00′52″E
- Country: Sweden
- Province: Skåne
- County: Skåne County
- Municipality: Malmö Municipality
- Borough of Malmö: Fosie

Population (1 January 2011)
  - Total: 1,841
- Time zone: UTC+1 (CET)
  - Summer (DST): UTC+2 (CEST)

Heleneholm is a neighbourhood of Malmö, situated in the Borough of Fosie, Malmö Municipality, Skåne County, Sweden.
