= Oxie =

- Former city district
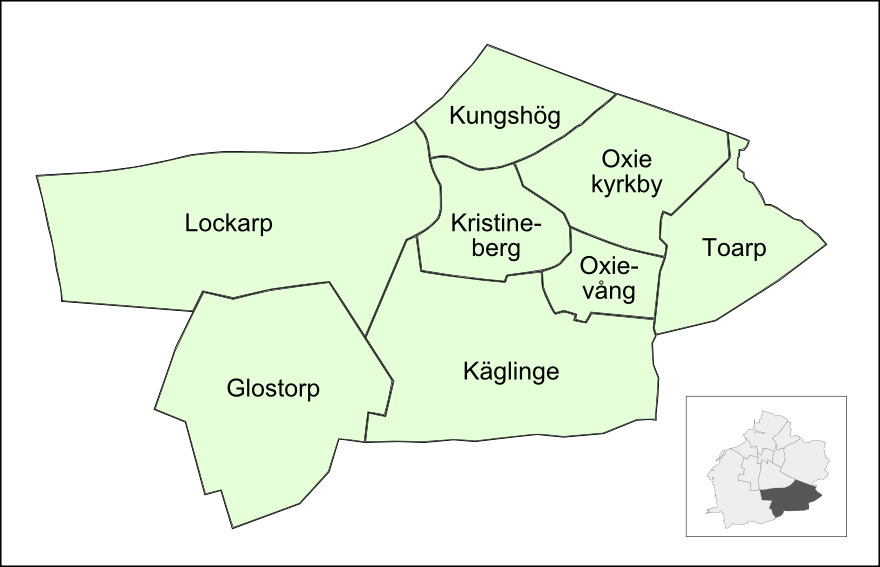
- Oxie's neighbourhoods
- Country: Sweden
- Province: Scania
- County: Skåne County
- Municipality: Malmö Municipality

Area
  - Total: 2,306 ha (5,700 acres)

Population (2012)
  - Total: 12,453
  - Density: 540.0/km^{2} (1,399/sq mi)
- Time zone: UTC+01:00 (CET)
  - Summer (DST): UTC+02:00 (CEST)

Oxie (Swedish pronunciation: [ˈʊ̂ksɪɛ]) is a locality and was a city district (Swedish: stadsdel) in the south-east of Malmö Municipality, Sweden. On 1 July 2013, the city district was merged with Fosie, forming Söder. In 2012, Oxie had a population of 12,453 of the municipality's 307,758. The area was 2,306 hectares.

Notable buildings include the medieval Oxie church (Oxie kyrka) and the water tower. From the railway station commuter trains proceed to Malmö and Ystad.

It is dominated by residential areas of single-family detached home and semi-detached houses. Oxie centrum is the center point of the town with a small square, several stores and service providers.

== History ==
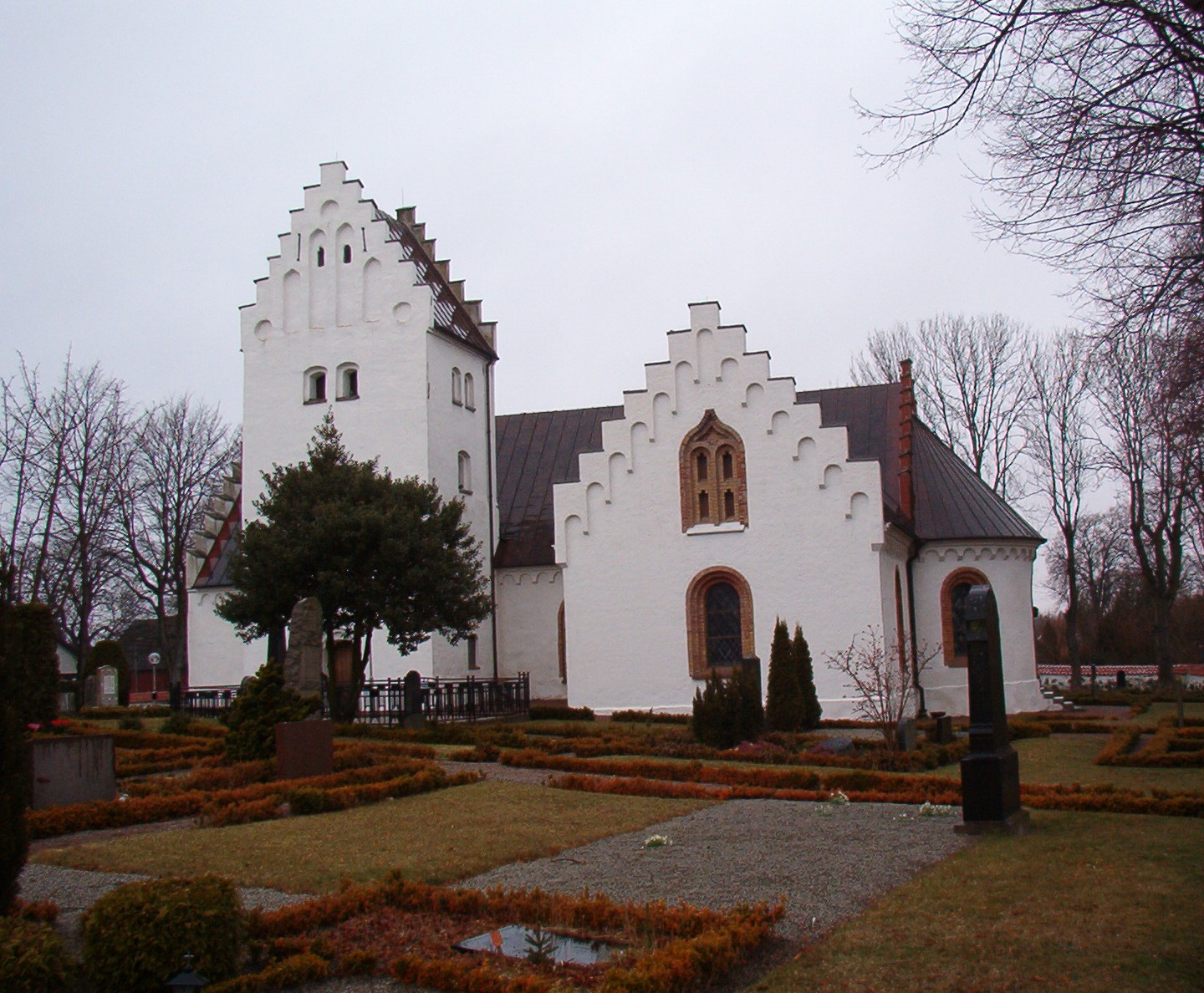
12th-century Oxie church.

The area around Oxie is rich in archaeological finds. Settlements from the Neolithic, Bronze Age and Iron Age have been discovered. The spectacular bronze-age burial mounds Kungshögarna (Mounds of the Kings) provides a monumental sight, overlooking the highway to Malmö. These mounds, at 60 m above sea level, are also the highest natural point in Malmö municipality.

Oxie is first mentioned in written sources 1130 as Oshögha, believed to mean the mound by the spring. As the center point of the church municipality Oxie hundred, Oxie was also the seat of the hundred thing (Häradstinget), which was held every spring and autumn. Local names such as Tingbacken (Thing hill) and Tingdammen (Thing pond) indicate the location of the things. Galjebacken (Gallow Hill) is another place, bearing witness to the judicial powers of the hundred thing. Galjebacken was used for executions well into the 19th century. The oldest building in Oxie is the church, originally built in 1160. It was heavily restored in 1848 by Carl Georg Brunius, but the walls of the nave, the southern gate and the Baptismal font are all remains from the original church. There are theories that a wooden church existed at the site prior to the 1160 stone construction.

In the late 19th and early 20th century, the village expanded with the establishment of several brick and gravel industries. Remains from this era can still be seen in the topography of Oxie. Like in many other small, rural communities this rapid industrialisation was facilitated by the establishment of railroad communications.

Oxie was a municipality of its own until it merged with Malmö in 1967. Today, Oxie is made up of the previously separate villages Oxie, Käglinge, Toarp and Kristineberg. In addition, Oxie district also included the villages Lockarp, Glostorp and Krumby.

== Neighborhoods ==
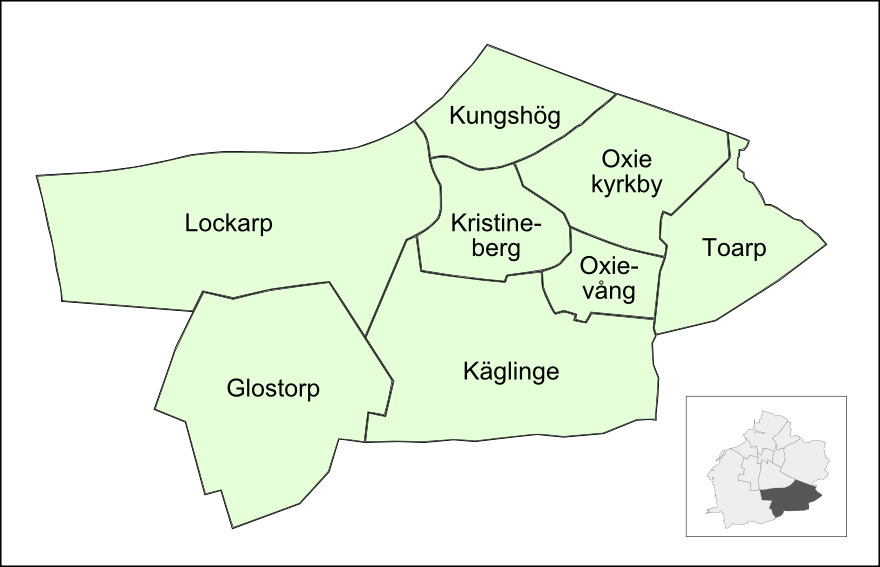
Neighbourhoods before July 2013.

The neighbourhoods of the city district of Oxie were:

- Glostorp
- Kristineberg
- Kungshög
- Käglinge
- Lockarp
- Oxie kyrkby
- Oxievång
- Toarp

== Demographics ==
During the later half of the 20th century, the population skyrocketed to more than 10,000 from 1,608 in 1957, as it became more attractive for families to move outside of the city. A major residential area, Oxievång, was built during the 1970s and 1980s.

During the 1990s and early 2000s, significant numbers of immigrants moved to Oxie.

The ten largest groups of foreign-born persons are:

1. Denmark (858)
2. Poland (220)
3. (Socialist Federal Republic of Yugoslavia) Former Yugoslavia (200)
4. Iraq (108)
5. Hungary (95)
6. Iran (91)
7. Pakistan (84)
8. Germany (78)
9. Bosnia and Herzegovina (77)
10. Finland (66)

The construction of the Øresund Bridge, combined with the high cost of living in Denmark, has led to large numbers of Danish people settling in Oxie recently. The proximity to Copenhagen and good communications make Oxie an attractive alternative for those who commute to the Danish side. In 2006, there were 451 Danish-born persons, the figure increased to 602 in 2007 and in 2009, 858 Danes lived in Oxie.

== Education ==
There are nine public preschools/kindergartens as well as four schools in Oxie today. Blankebäcksskolan, Kungshögsskolan and Tingdammsskolan are primary schools, while Oxievångsskolan is a secondary school. Oxie is the location of a flower school named Ingvar Strandhs Blomsterskola. It is the leading florist school in Sweden, with students coming from as far as Japan to participate in courses.

== Sports ==
The following sports clubs are located in Oxie:

- Oxie IF
- Rönnebäcks GK, a golf club

== Flower business ==
In addition to hosting the florist school, Oxie is the number one flower transit point in Sweden. Several flower importing companies have facilities in Oxie, receiving shipments of flowers from all over Europe. As much as 80% of the imported cut flowers coming to Sweden pass through here.
