= Chimundo =

Village in Mozambique

- Village
- Location within Mozambique
- Coordinates: 24°31′0.1″S 33°48′43.62″E
- Country: Mozambique
- Province: Gaza
- District: Chibuto
- Time zone: UTC+2:00 (CAT)

Chimundo is a village in Mozambique. It is located in the Chibuto District in the province of Gaza.

In 2009, 19 students on a trip from the Bergen School of Architecture built a school building for a daycare center for disadvantaged children in Chimundo in a span of 12 days.
