= Östra Söderkulla =

- Neighbourhood
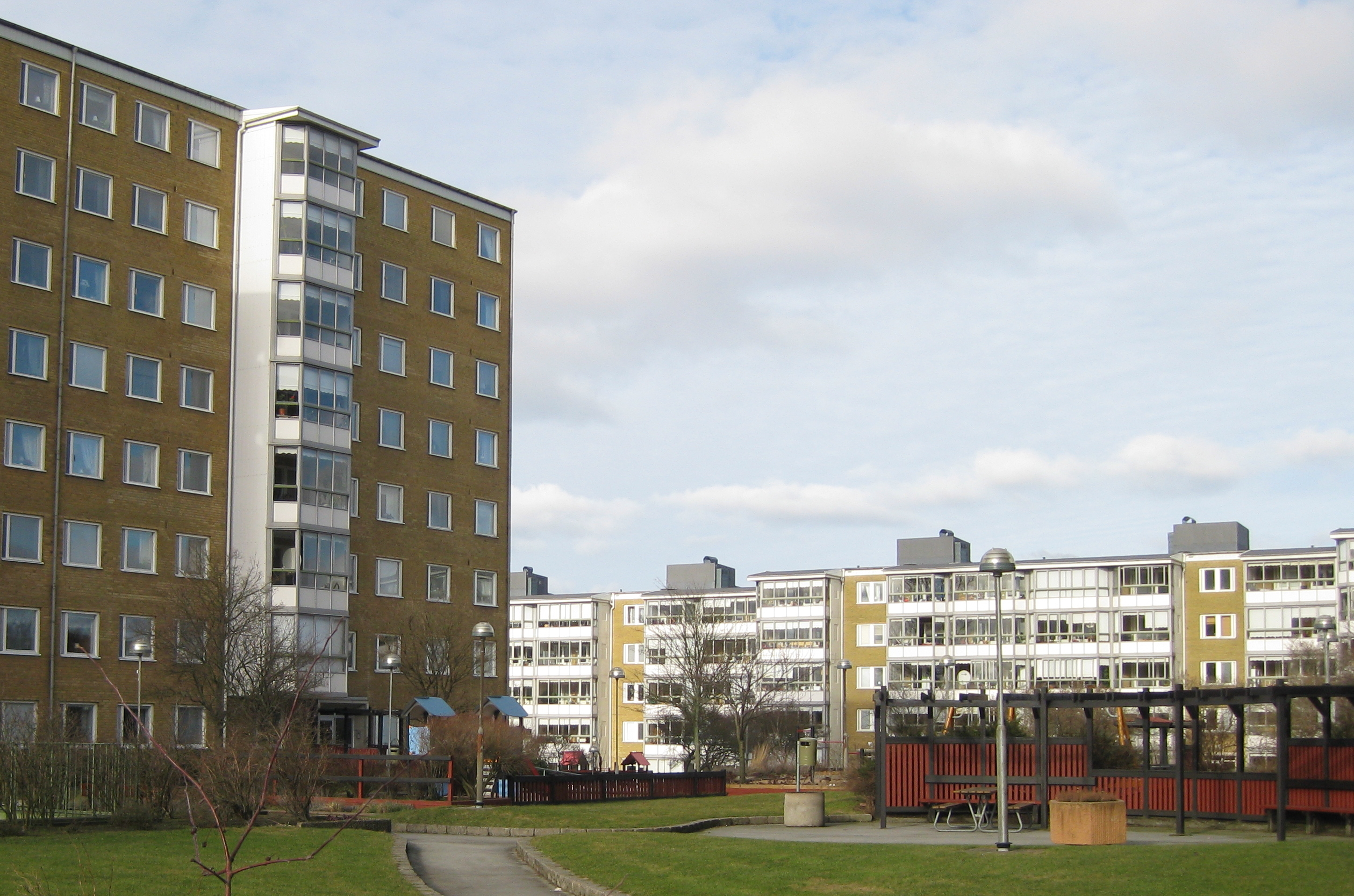
- Interactive map of Östra Söderkulla
- Coordinates: 55°34′4″N 13°0′28″E
- Country: Sweden
- Province: Skåne
- County: Skåne County
- Municipality: Malmö Municipality
- Borough of Malmö: Fosie

Population (1 January 2011)
  - Total: 1,138
- Time zone: UTC+1 (CET)
  - Summer (DST): UTC+2 (CEST)

Östra Söderkulla is a neighbourhood of Malmö, situated in the Borough of Fosie, Malmö Municipality, Skåne County, Sweden.
