= Svein Hatløy =

Norwegian architect (1940–2015)

Svein Hatløy (12 May 1940 – 5 July 2015) was a Norwegian architect, professor and founder of the Bergen School of Architecture.

He was born in Årdal Municipality. Hatløy was the principal of the Bergen School of Architecture from its foundation in 1986 until August 2007. After his retirement as the school's principal, he still works as professor for the institution. He was educated as an architect at the Norwegian Institute of Technology in 1964 and later studied at the Warsaw Academy of Fine Arts.

He was given the Norwegian National Association of Architects' Honorable Membership in 2001 because of his long work with BAS. He died in 2015.

Academic offices
New title	Principal of the Bergen School of Architecture; 1986–2007	Succeeded by Marianne Skjulhaug
