= Söder, Malmö =

City district of Malmö, Sweden

Söder
- City district
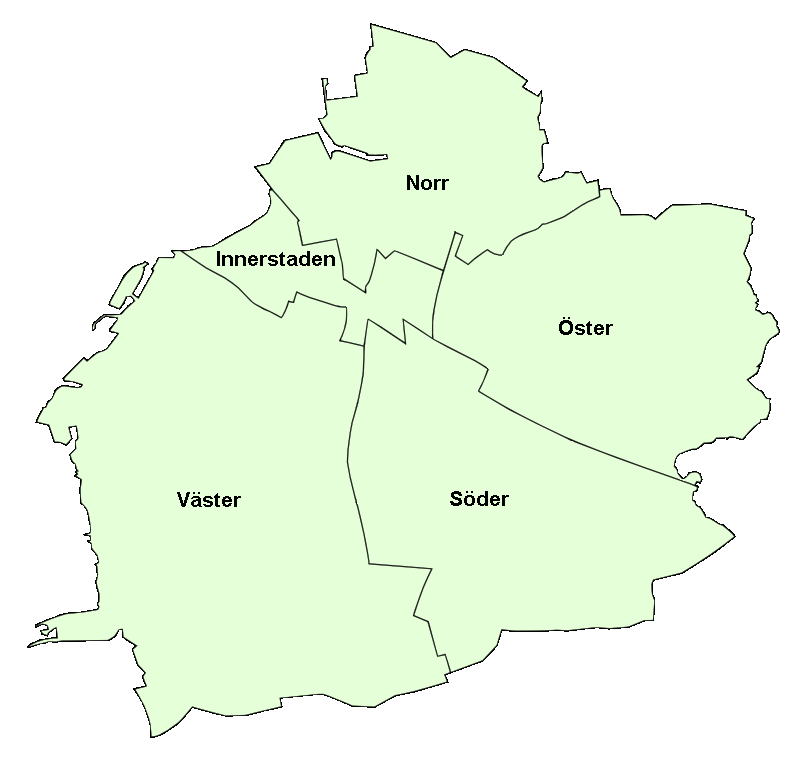
- Malmö's city districts
- Country: Sweden
- Province: Scania
- County: Skåne County
- Municipality: Malmö Municipality

Population (2013)
  - Total: 56,300
- Time zone: UTC+01:00 (CET)
  - Summer (DST): UTC+02:00 (CEST)
- Website: www.malmo.se/soder

Söder (lit. 'South') is a city district (Swedish: stadsområde) in Malmö Municipality, Sweden. It was established on 1 July 2013 after the merger of Fosie and Oxie. It has a population of 56,300.
