= Fredriksberg, Malmö =

Neighbourhood of Malmö, Sweden

Fredriksberg
- Neighbourhood
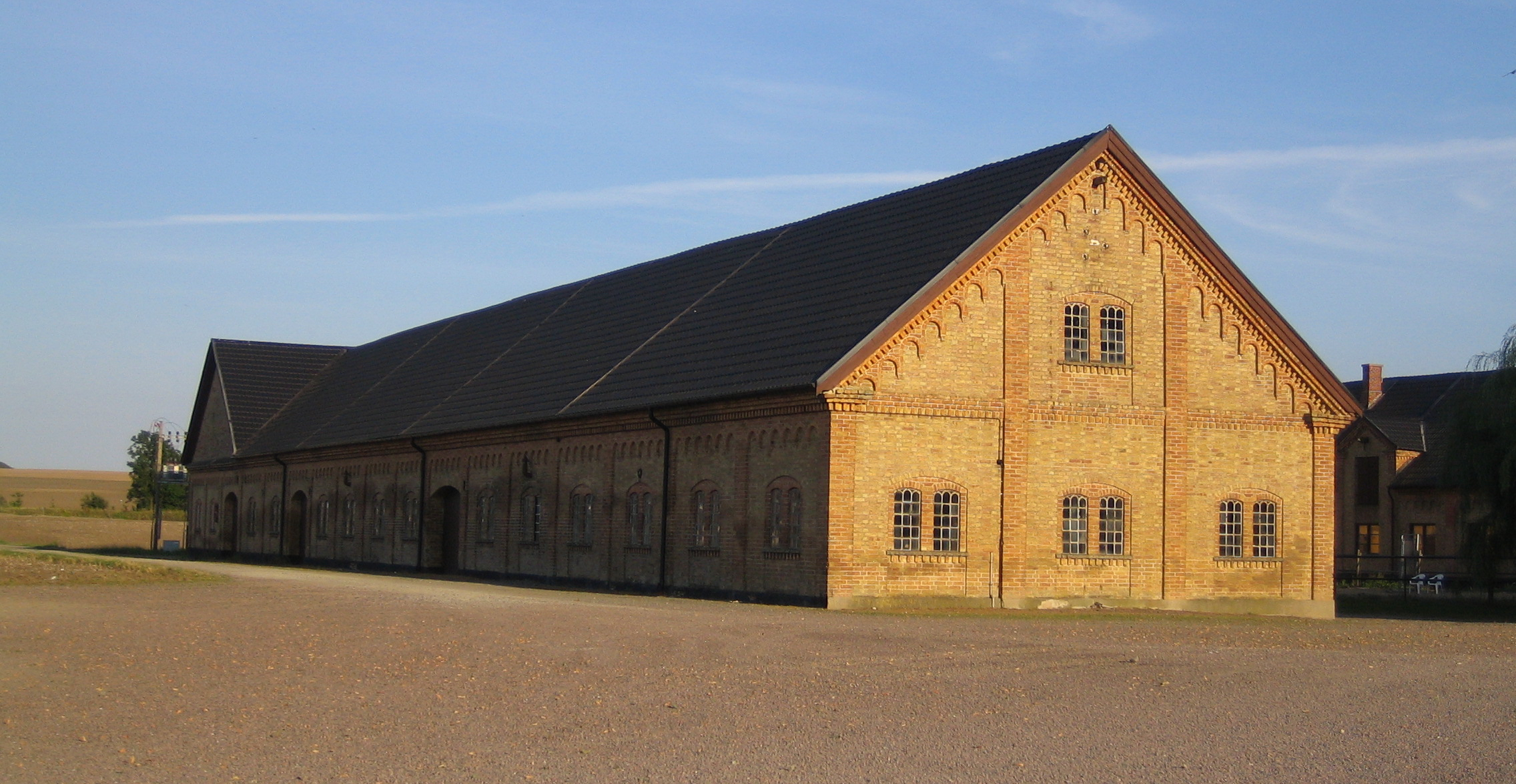
- Interactive map of Fredriksberg
- Coordinates: 55°33′34″N 13°03′57″E
- Country: Sweden
- Province: Skåne
- County: Skåne County
- Municipality: Malmö Municipality
- Borough of Malmö: Fosie

Population (1 January 2011)
  - Total: 23
- Time zone: UTC+1 (CET)
  - Summer (DST): UTC+2 (CEST)

Fredriksberg is a neighbourhood of Malmö, situated in the Borough of Fosie, Malmö Municipality, Skåne County, Sweden.
