= Kristineberg, Malmö =

Kristineberg
- Neighbourhood
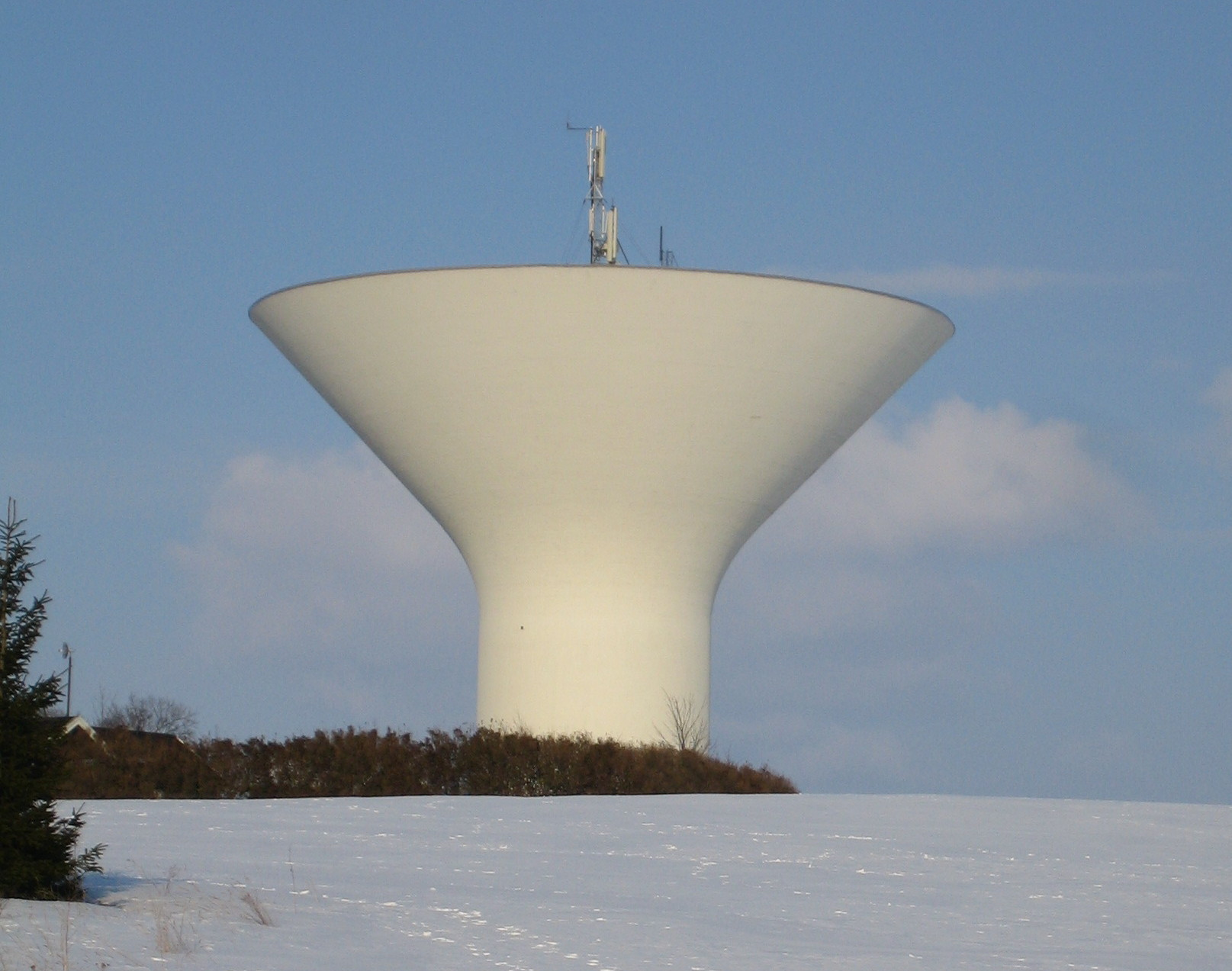
- Interactive map of Kristineberg
- Coordinates: 55°32′40″N 13°04′30″E
- Country: Sweden
- Province: Skåne
- County: Skåne County
- Municipality: Malmö Municipality
- Borough of Malmö: Oxie

Population (1 January 2011)
  - Total: 1,687
- Time zone: UTC+1 (CET)
  - Summer (DST): UTC+2 (CEST)

Kristineberg is a neighbourhood of the Borough of Oxie, Malmö Municipality, Skåne County, Sweden.
