= Kristineberg, Oskarshamn =

Kristineberg
- Location within Kalmar Location within Sweden
- Coordinates: 57°14′54.2″N 16°27′59.1″E
- Country: Sweden
- Province: Småland
- County: Kalmar County
- Municipality: Oskarshamn Municipality

Area
  - Total: 1.83 km^{2} (0.71 sq mi)

Population (13 November 2013)
  - Total: 3,048
  - Density: 1,657/km^{2} (4,290/sq mi)
- Time zone: UTC+1 (CET)
  - Summer (DST): UTC+2 (CEST)

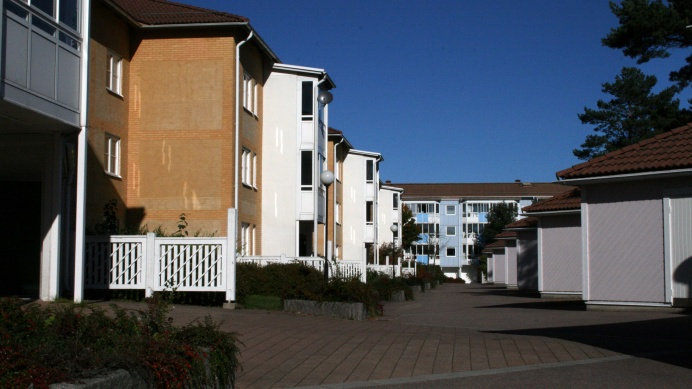
Apartment house on Arkitektvägen

Kristineberg is a City District in Oskarshamn, Kalmar County, Sweden. The population is 3,048 in 2013.

The first apartment house in Kristineberg was built in December 1966 and the last house was completed in 1979. Kristineberg consists of three areas, Lyckan, Karlsborg and Marieborg.

School, libraries, supermarket, veterinary, church and pizzeria is located in Kristineberg center.

== See also ==
- Oskarshamn
- Oskarshamn Municipality
