= Aanestad =

Aanestad is a surname. Notable people with the surname include:

- Sam Aanestad (1946–2018), American physician, surgeon, and politician
- Vegard Aanestad (born 1987), Norwegian professional football player

== See also ==
- Annestad
