= Södra Klagshamn =

- Location within Skåne Location within Sweden
- Coordinates: 55°31′N 12°55′E
- Country: Sweden
- Province: Skåne
- County: Skåne County
- Municipality: Malmö Municipality

Area
  - Total: 0.45 km^{2} (0.17 sq mi)

Population (31 December 2010)
  - Total: 1,367
  - Density: 3,056/km^{2} (7,920/sq mi)
- Time zone: UTC+1 (CET)
  - Summer (DST): UTC+2 (CEST)

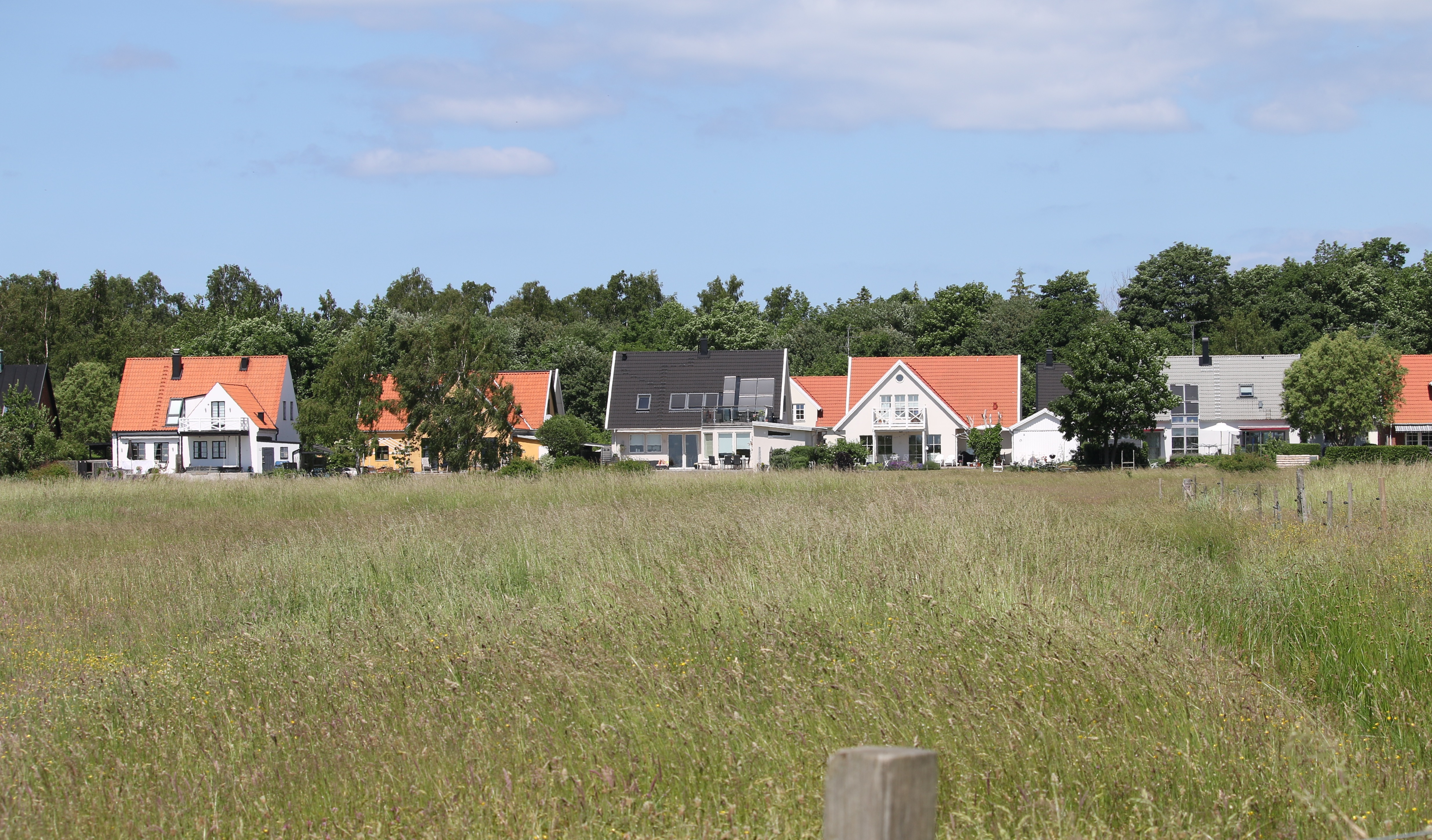
Villas in Sodra Klagshamn

Södra Klagshamn was a locality situated in Malmö Municipality, Skåne County, Sweden with 1,367 inhabitants in 2010. It has grown together with Bunkeflostrand locality by 2015.
