= Annestad =

Neighbourhood in Malmö, Sweden

Coordinates: 58°16′N 12°43′E

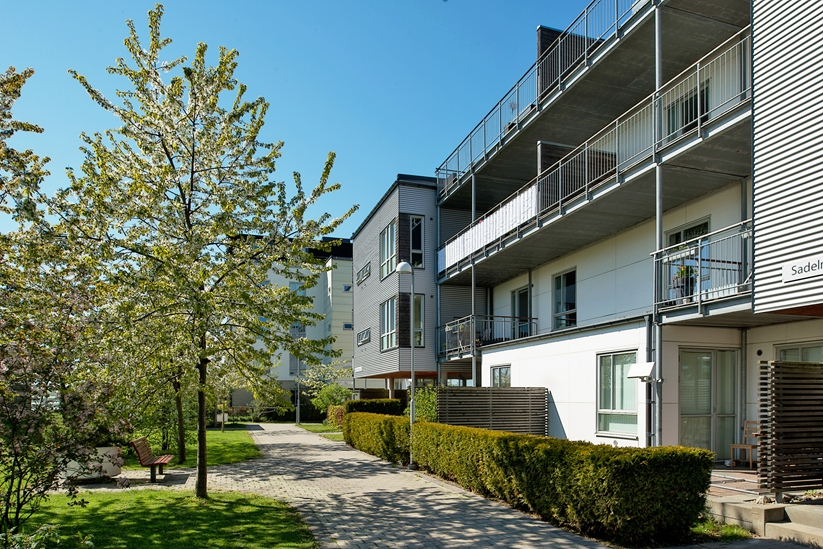
Apartment building in Annestad.

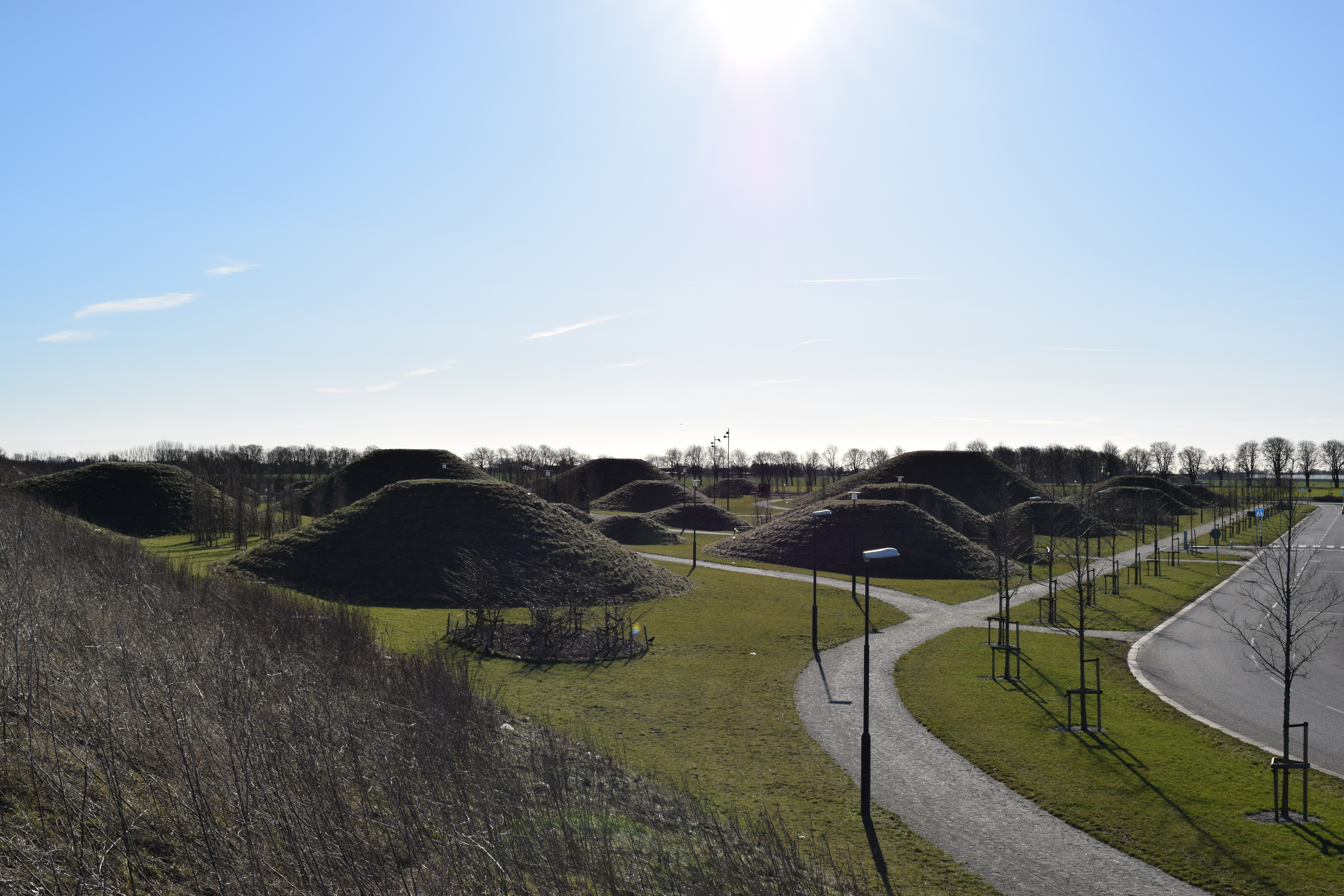
Annestad's children's winter park

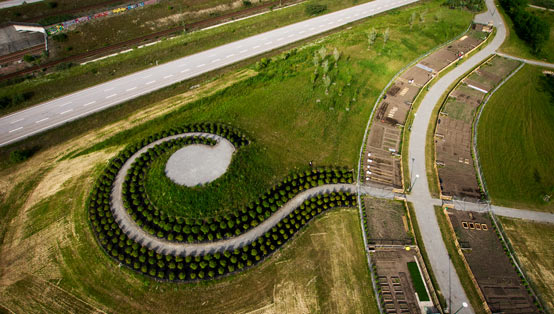
Viewpoint at Annestad's allotment gardens seen from above.

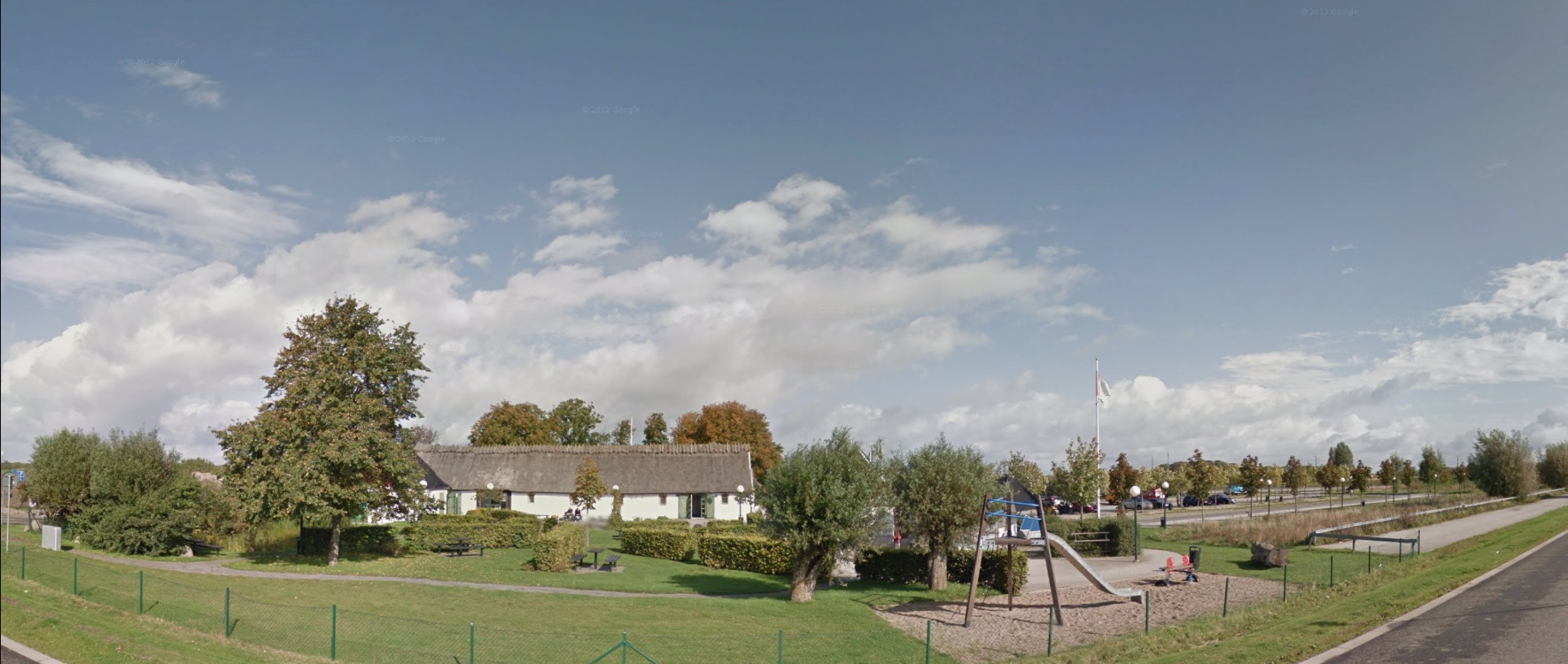
Skånegården tourism centre and cafe

Annestad is an area in the eastern part of Bunkeflostrand, a suburb of Malmö, Sweden. The area is situated just south of the Outer ring road and Limhamns kalkbrott.

== Buildings ==
In Annestad, there are about 1,200 apartments in buildings 2-4 stories high. In the eastern part there is a collective housing called BoAktiv Landgången. In the centre, there is a grocery store, a hairdresser and a pizza place. There is also a Capio Citykliniken medical centre in the area. At Annestad's northern end there is a cafe and tourism centre called Skånegården. In the spring of 2013, the city of Malmö completed an area of allotment gardens situated west of Skånegården. In the eastern part, there is a winter park for children with hills for riding sledges. In the western end, there are parks, a playground and soccer fields. In this part of Annestad, there is also a pre-school, which opened in 2007.

== Transport ==
The area is served by city bus number 6 which goes between Klagshamn/Bunkeflostrand and Videdal/Toftanäs, which stops at Hyllie railway station/Emporia (shopping mall). It is also served by bus 999, a commuter bus to Copenhagen and Copenhagen airport. The Outer ring road passes by just north of Annestad with Vintrie interchange being the closest, which is also the last interchange in Sweden before going on the Öresund bridge.
