= Lucas Hägg-Johansson =

Swedish footballer (born 1994)

Personal information
- Full name: Åke Hugo Lucas Hägg-Johansson
- Date of birth: 11 July 1994 (age 32)
- Place of birth: Riseberga, Sweden
- Height: 1.89 m (6 ft 2 in)
- Position: Goalkeeper

Team information
- Current team: IF Elfsborg
- Number: 30

Youth career
- Husie IF
- –2012: FC Rosengård
- 2012–2013: Kalmar FF

Senior career*
Years	Team	Apps	(Gls)
2014–2021	Kalmar FF	129	(0)
2014–2015	→ Oskarshamn (loan)	34	(0)
2022–2023	Vejle	13	(0)
2023–2025	Brommapojkarna	15	(0)
2025–	IF Elfsborg	1	(0)
- * Club domestic league appearances and goals as of 7 May 2025

Åke Hugo Lucas Hägg-Johansson (born 11 July 1994) is a Swedish footballer who plays as a goalkeeper for Allsvenskan club IF Elfsborg.

== Career ==
=== Club career ===
Raised in Riseberga, Malmö, Hägg-Johansson started playing football as a young junior in Husie IF. At the age of 15, Lucas then joined FC Rosengård. In Rosengård, he trained with the first team under manager Mats Larsson. During 2011, Hägg-Johansson also sat on the bench in 11 games for Rosengård in the Swedish Division 1. At this time Hägg-Johansson had offers from among others Lunds BK and Malmö FF.

However, In 2012, 17-year old Hägg-Johansson decided to join Kalmar FF. Here he had the opportunity to be the third goalkeeper behind Petter Wastå and Etrit Berisha. Yet to have get his debut for Kalmar, Hägg-Johansson spent the 2014 and 2015 seasons on loan at Oskarshamns AIK as part of a partnership between the two clubs, where he played in Division 1.

Returning to Kalmar FF, Hägg-Johansson made his debut in the Swedish top-tier, Allsvenskan, on 14 August 2016 when he was given a chance in the 1-1 match against Malmö FF. From the 2017 season and onwards, Hägg-Johansson established himself as the starting goalkeeper, playing 25 league games throughout the season and 30 in the 2018 season. After two slightly less good seasons - when he was even dropped from the team for a few matches in the 2021 season - it was confirmed on 4 January 2022, that Hägg-Johansson had left the club.

On 12 January 2022, Hägg-Johansson joined Danish Superliga club Vejle Boldklub.

== Career statistics ==
As of match played 10 November 2024

Appearances and goals by club, season and competition
Club	Season	League			National cup (Note: Includes Svenska Cupen, Danish Cup)		Continental		Other		Total	
Club	Season	Division	Apps	Goals	Apps	Goals	Apps	Goals	Apps	Goals	Apps	Goals
Kalmar FF	2012	Allsvenskan	0	0	0	0	0	0	—		0	0
Kalmar FF	2013	Allsvenskan	0	0	0	0	—		—		0	0
Kalmar FF	2015	Allsvenskan	0	0	0	0	—		—		0	0
Kalmar FF	2016	Allsvenskan	1	0	3	0	—		—		4	0
Kalmar FF	2017	Allsvenskan	25	0	0	0	—		—		25	0
Kalmar FF	2018	Allsvenskan	30	0	3	0	—		—		33	0
Kalmar FF	2019	Allsvenskan	30	0	0	0	—		2 (Note: Appearance(s) in Allsvenskan Promotion/Relegation play-offs)	0	32	0
Kalmar FF	2020	Allsvenskan	17	0	3	0	—		2	0	22	0
Kalmar FF	2021	Allsvenskan	26	0	3	0	—		—		29	0
Kalmar FF	Total		129	0	12	0	0	0	4	0	145	0
Oskarshamn	2014	Division 1	13	0	0	0	—		—		13	0
Oskarshamn	2015	Division 1	21	0	0	0	—		—		21	0
Oskarshamn	Total		34	0	0	0	—		—		34	0
Vejle	2021-22	Danish Superliga	1	0	0	0	—		—		1	0
Vejle	2022-23	Danish 1st Division	12	0	1	0	—		—		13	0
Vejle	Total		13	0	1	0	—		—		14	0
IF Brommapojkarna	2023	Allsvenskan	7	0	0	0	—		0	0	7	0
IF Brommapojkarna	2024	Allsvenskan	8	0	0	0	—		—		8	0
IF Brommapojkarna	Total		15	0	0	0	—		0	0	15	0
Career total			191	0	13	0	0	0	4	0	208	0

== Honours ==
Vejle

- Danish 1st Division: 2022–23
