= Husie =

- Former city district
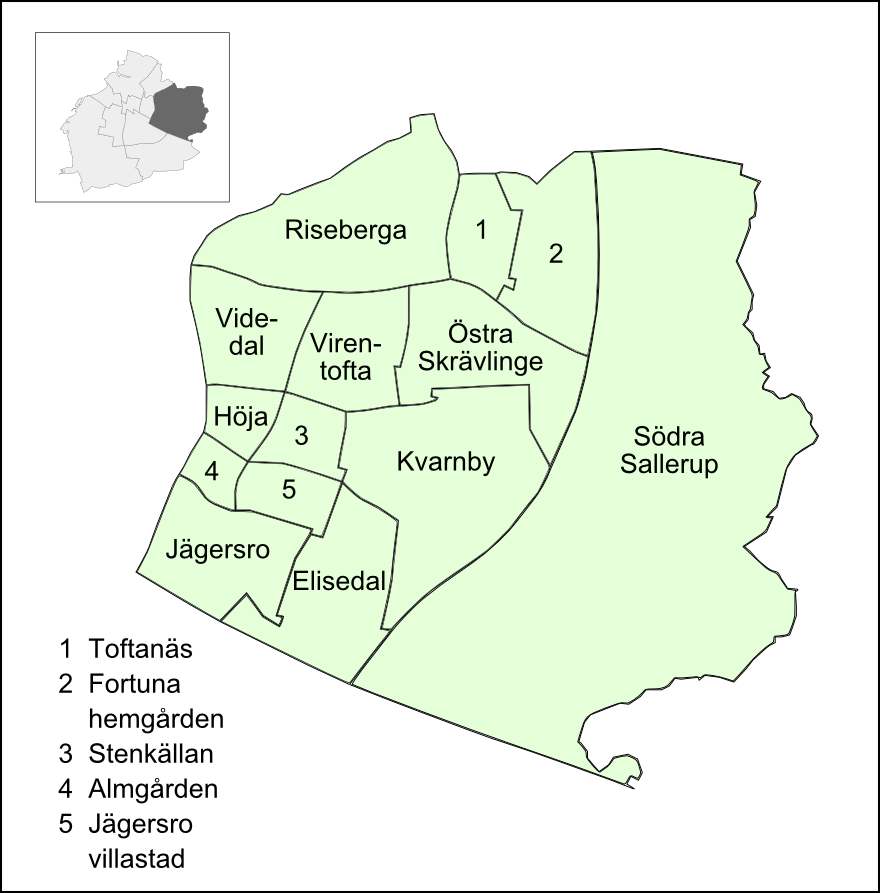
- Husie's neighbourhoods
- Country: Sweden
- Province: Scania
- County: Skåne County
- Municipality: Malmö Municipality

Area
  - Total: 2,984 ha (7,370 acres)

Population (2012)
  - Total: 20,769
  - Density: 696.0/km^{2} (1,803/sq mi)
- Time zone: UTC+01:00 (CET)
  - Summer (DST): UTC+02:00 (CEST)

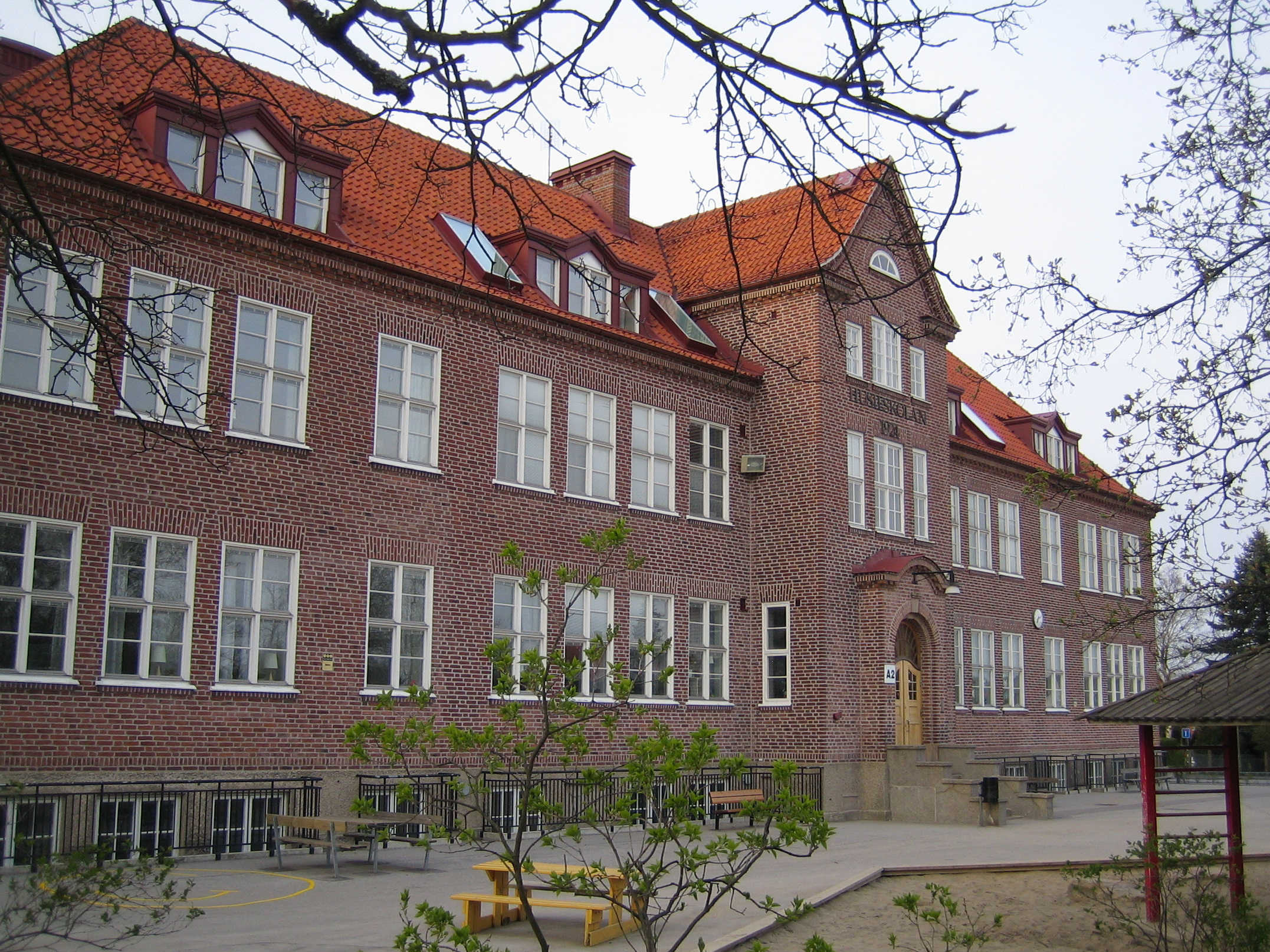
School in Husie.

Husie (Swedish pronunciation: [ˈhʉ̂ːsɪɛ]) was a city district (Swedish: stadsdel) in the north-east of Malmö Municipality, Sweden. On 1 July 2013, it was merged with Rosengård, forming Öster. In 2012, Husie had a population of 20,769 of the municipality's 307,758. The area was 2,984 hectares.

The population consists primarily of middle-income families living in single-family homes. It has been called "the green city district" due to its many recreational areas, among them Bulltofta field and Husie mosse and its proximity to the countryside. Husie is also home to the Jägersro derby track, a large stadium for horse racing that is famous for its annual derby. Husie has the highest life expectancy rate in Malmö and one of the highest in Sweden. Husie is the home to two football clubs: Kvarnby IK and Husie IF.

== History ==
Husie was primarily built in the 1960s. Half of the population lives in villa residential areas and the other half in apartment residential areas.

== Neighbourhoods ==
The neighbourhoods of Husie were:

- Almgården
- Elisedal
- Fortuna Hemgården
- Höja
- Jägersro
- Jägersro villastad
- Kvarnby
- Riseberga
- Stenkällan
- Södra Sallerup
- Toftanäs
- Videdal
- Virentofta
- Östra Skrävlinge

== Demographics ==
19% of the population is born abroad.

The ten largest groups of foreign-born persons in 2010 were:

1. (Socialist Federal Republic of Yugoslavia) Former Yugoslavia (565)
2. Denmark (432)
3. Poland (423)
4. Iraq (297)
5. Bosnia and Herzegovina (215)
6. Iran (144)
7. Germany (99)
8. (North Macedonia) Macedonia (97)
9. Hungary (93)
10. Finland (90)
