= Elisedal =

Neighbourhood of Malmö, Sweden

- Neighbourhood
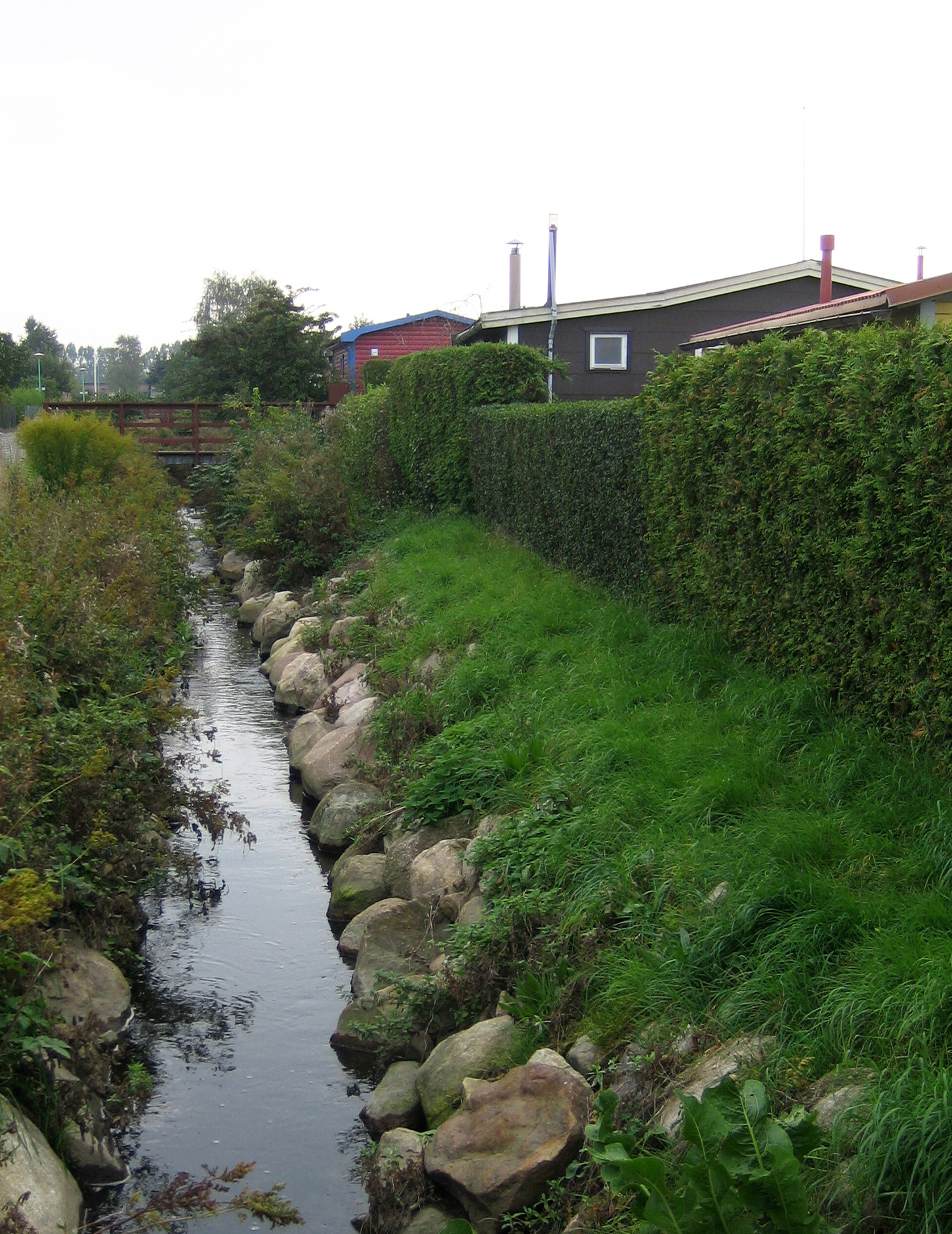
- Interactive map of Elisedal
- Coordinates: 55°34′01″N 13°04′28″E
- Country: Sweden
- Province: Skåne
- County: Skåne County
- Municipality: Malmö Municipality
- Borough of Malmö: Husie

Population (1 January 2011)
  - Total: 9
- Time zone: UTC+1 (CET)
  - Summer (DST): UTC+2 (CEST)

Elisedal is a neighbourhood of Malmö, situated in the Borough of Husie, Malmö Municipality, Skåne County, Sweden.
