= Södra Sallerup =

- Neighbourhood
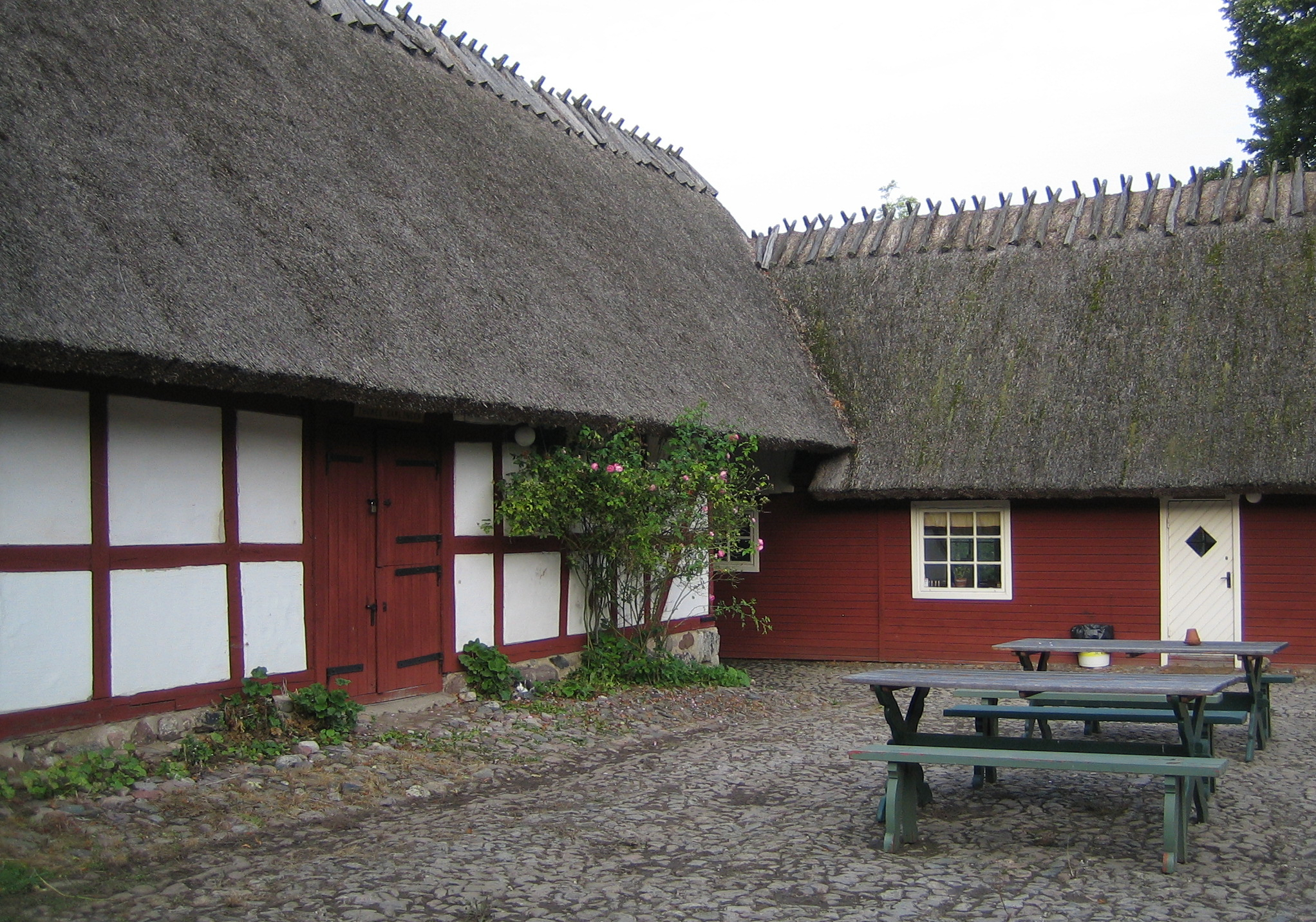
- Interactive map of Södra Sallerup
- Coordinates: 55°35′06″N 13°07′13″E
- Country: Sweden
- Province: Skåne
- County: Skåne County
- Municipality: Malmö Municipality
- Borough of Malmö: Husie

Population (1 January 2011)
  - Total: 331
- Time zone: UTC+1 (CET)
  - Summer (DST): UTC+2 (CEST)

Södra Sallerup is a neighbourhood of Malmö, situated in the Borough of Husie, Malmö Municipality, Skåne County, Sweden.
