= Kvarnby =

- Neighbourhood
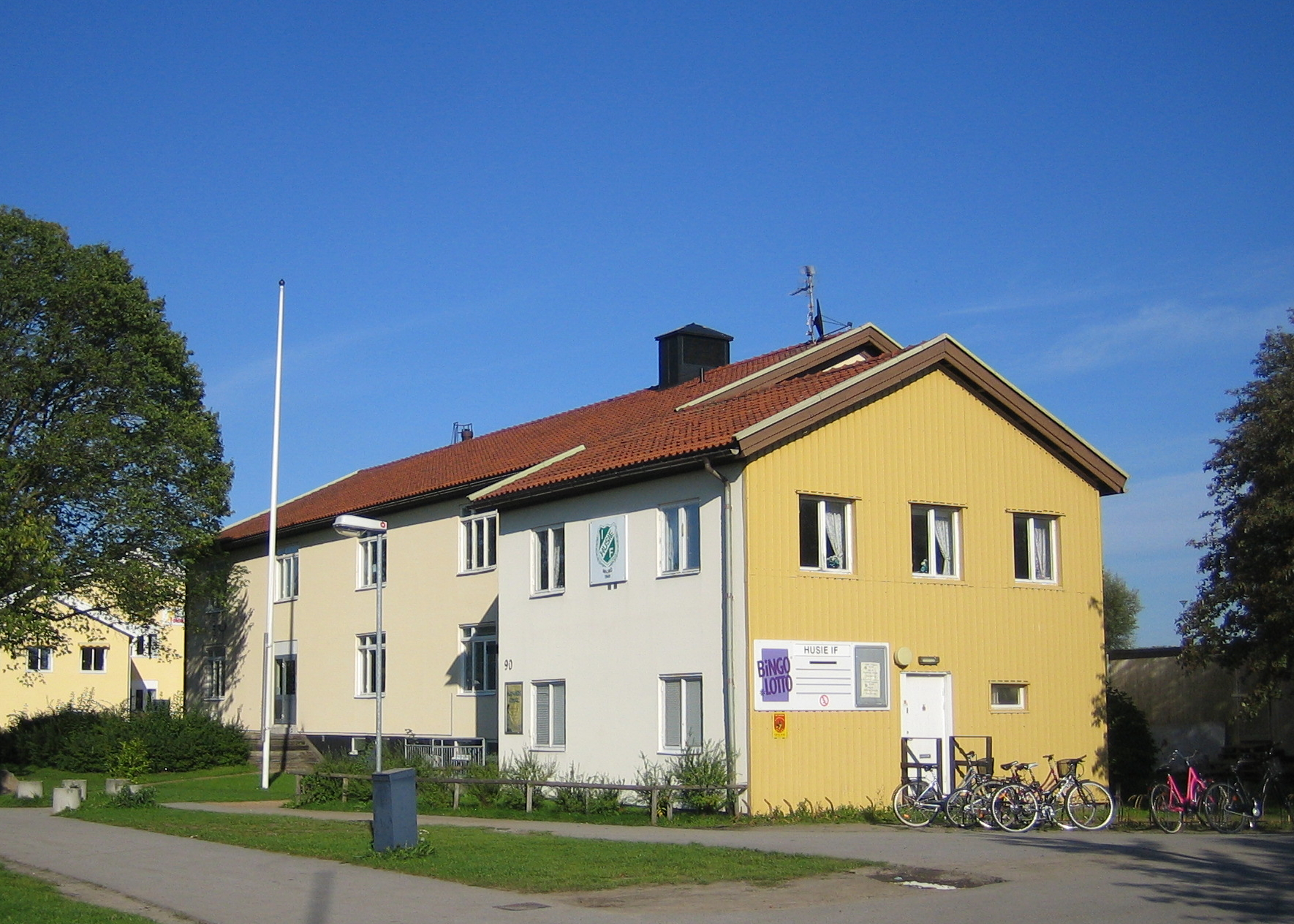
- Interactive map of Kvarnby
- Coordinates: 55°34′33″N 13°05′58″E
- Country: Sweden
- Province: Skåne
- County: Skåne County
- Municipality: Malmö Municipality
- Borough of Malmö: Husie

Population (1 January 2011)
  - Total: 779
- Time zone: UTC+1 (CET)
  - Summer (DST): UTC+2 (CEST)

Kvarnby is a neighbourhood of Malmö, situated in the Borough of Husie, Malmö Municipality, Skåne County, Sweden.

== Sports ==
The following sports clubs are located in Kvarnby:

- Kvarnby IK
- Kvarnby Golfklubb
