= Almgården, Malmö =

Neighbourhood in Sweden

Almgården
- Neighbourhood
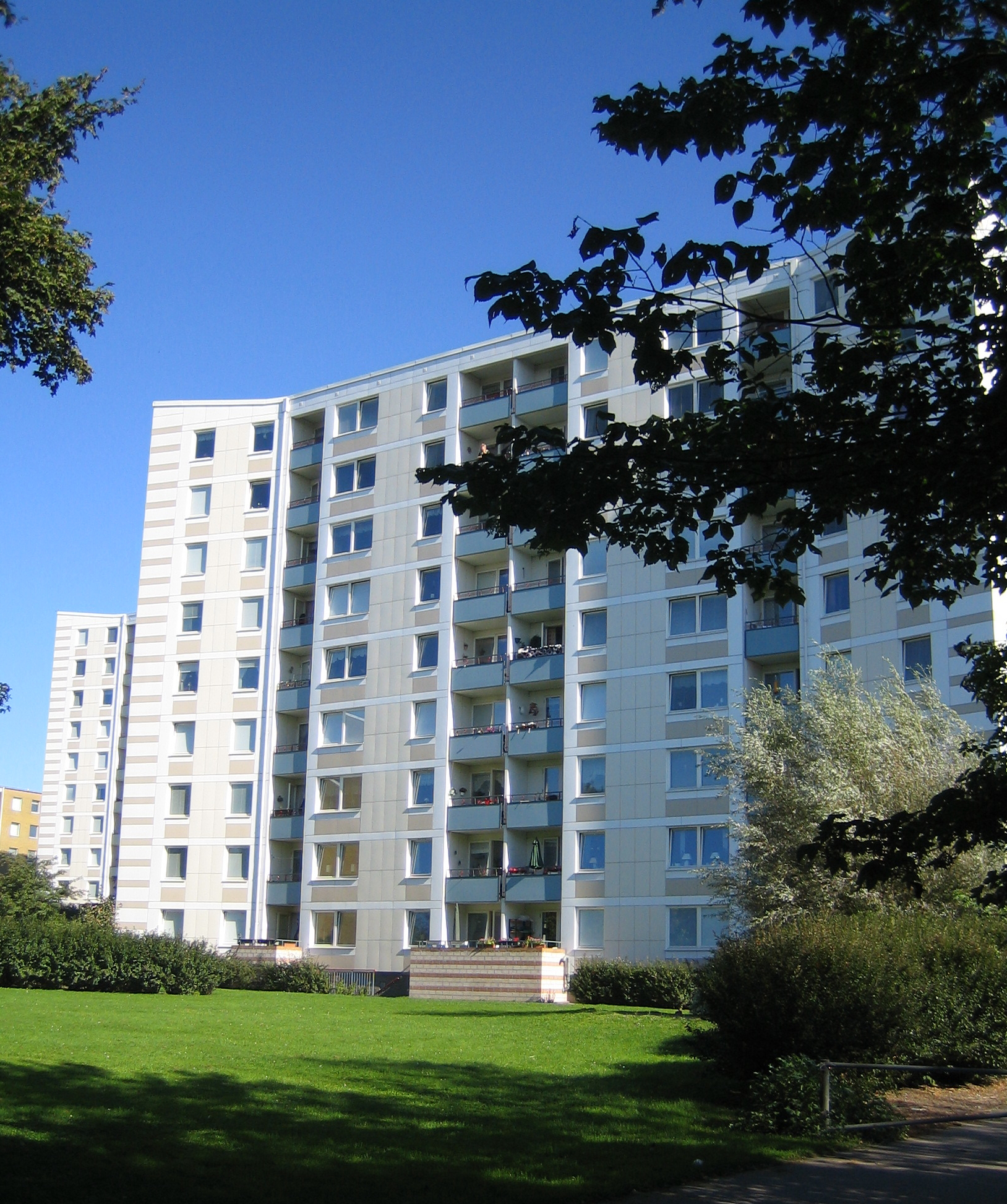
- Almgården
- Interactive map of Almgården
- Coordinates: 55°34′15″N 13°03′54″E
- Country: Sweden
- Province: Skåne
- County: Skåne County
- Municipality: Malmö Municipality
- Borough of Malmö: Husie

Population (1 January 2011)
  - Total: 1,687
- Time zone: UTC+1 (CET)
  - Summer (DST): UTC+2 (CEST)

Almgården is a neighbourhood, situated in the Borough of Öster, Malmö, Malmö Municipality, Skåne County, Sweden.
