= Bunkeflostrand =

Suburb of Malmö, Sweden

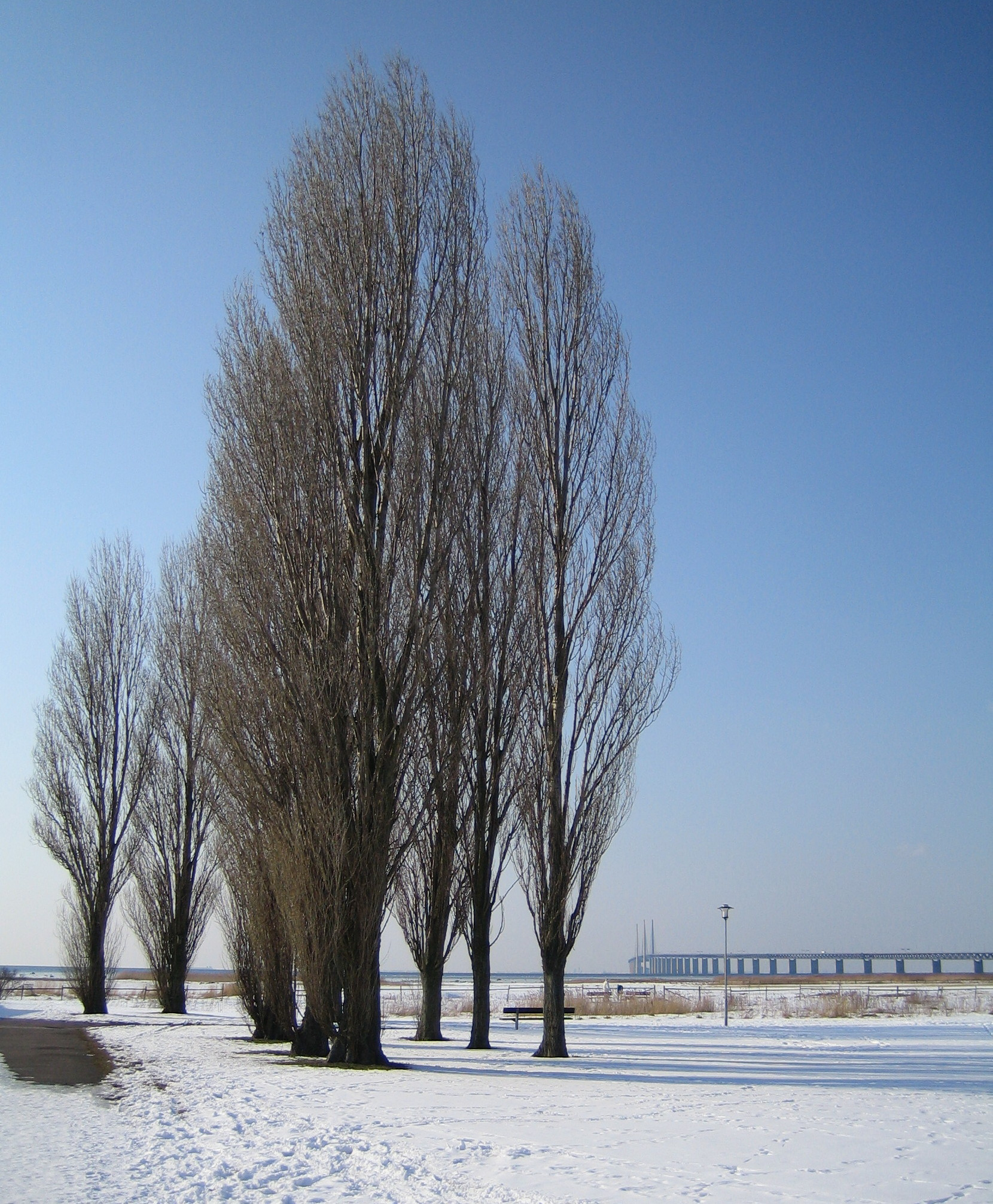
- Bunkeflostrand with the Öresund Bridge in the background

- Location within Skåne Location within Sweden
- Coordinates: 55°33′N 12°55′E
- Country: Sweden
- Province: Skåne
- County: Skåne County
- Municipality: Malmö Municipality

Area
  - Total: 5.02 km^{2} (1.94 sq mi)

Population (2020)
  - Total: 15,212
  - Density: 3,030/km^{2} (7,850/sq mi)
- Time zone: UTC+1 (CET)
  - Summer (DST): UTC+2 (CEST)

Bunkeflostrand is a suburb of Malmö and a locality situated in Malmö Municipality, Skåne County, Sweden with 15,212 inhabitants in 2021.

Bunkeflostrand is situated near the Öresund Bridge, 7.74 km south of Malmö City Centre, with which it is nearly, but not completely, conjoined. The eastern part of Bunkeflostrand consists of Annestad, an area with apartments.
