= Kvarnby IK =

Swedish football club

- Full name: Kvarnby Idrottsklubb
- Founded: 1906
- Ground: Bäckagårds IP, Malmö
- Capacity: 1000
- Chairman: Ann Åhman
- Manager: Ulf Jansson
- League: Division 3 Södra Götaland
Home colours	Away colours

Kvarnby IK is a Swedish football club from the residential area of Kvarnby in Malmö. The club plays in Division 2 Östra Götaland which is the fourth tier of Swedish football.

== Background ==
The club was founded in 1906, making it the second oldest football club in Malmö after IFK Malmö. Since their foundation Kvarnby IK has participated mainly in the lower divisions of the Swedish football league system. The club has experienced a period of glory in the last few years being promoted three times in the last three years, from Division 5 in 2007 to Division 2 in 2010. They play their home matches at the Bäckagårds IP in Malmö.

Kvarnby IK are affiliated to the Skånes Fotbollförbund.

== Season to season ==
Season	Level	Division	Section	Position	Movements
1999	Tier 8	Division 7	Skåne Sydvästra A	4th	
2000	Tier 8	Division 7	Skåne Sydvästra A	2nd	
2001	Tier 8	Division 7	Skåne Sydvästra B	3rd	Promotion Playoffs – Promoted
2002	Tier 7	Division 6	Skåne Sydvästra B	9th	
2003	Tier 7	Division 6	Skåne Sydvästra B	2nd	Promotion Playoffs – Promoted
2004	Tier 6	Division 5	Skåne Mellersta	11th	Relegated
2005	Tier 7	Division 6	Skåne Sydvästra B	3rd	Promotion Playoffs – Promoted
2006*	Tier 7	Division 5	Skåne Sydvästra	6th	
2007	Tier 7	Division 5	Skåne Mellersta	3rd	Promotion Playoffs – Promoted
2008	Tier 6	Division 4	Skåne Västra	2nd	Promotion Playoffs – Promoted
2009	Tier 5	Division 3	Södra Götaland	1st	Promoted
2010	Tier 4	Division 2	Södra Götaland	4th	
2011	Tier 4	Division 2	Södra Götaland	6th	
2012	Tier 4	Division 2	Södra Götaland	8th	
2013	Tier 4	Division 2	Södra Götaland	10th	
2014	Tier 4	Division 2	Östra Götaland	9th	
2015	Tier 4	Division 2	Södra Götaland	3rd	
2016	Tier 4	Division 2	Södra Götaland	9th	
2017	Tier 4	Division 2	Östra Götaland	10th	
2018	Tier 4	Division 2	Västra Götaland	12th	Relegation Playoffs – Relegated

== Players ==
=== Kvarnby IK squad ===
As of 2018-08-18 Note: Flags indicate national team as defined under FIFA eligibility rules; some limited exceptions apply. Players may hold more than one non-FIFA nationality.

No.	Pos.	Nation	Player
1	GK	(Sweden) SWE	Kevin Alin
2	DF	(Sweden) SWE	Simon Thoresson
3	DF	(Sweden) SWE	Alexander Friberg
5	DF	(Sweden) SWE	Philip Tran
6	MF	(Sweden) SWE	Emil Grimbe
7	MF	(Sweden) SWE	Ludvig Johansson
8	MF	(Sweden) SWE	Sebastian Lundin
9	MF	(Sweden) SWE	Edrisa Jallow
10	FW	(Sweden) SWE	Alexander Engbe
11	DF	(Sweden) SWE	Francis Mensah
12	FW	(Sweden) SWE	Terry Adadevoh Svensson
14	MF	(Sweden) SWE	Oskar Zubac

No.	Pos.	Nation	Player
15	DF	(Sweden) SWE	Jesper Örnberg
16	MF	(Sweden) SWE	Mirlind Mejzinolli
17	FW	(Sweden) SWE	John Ekeh
18	MF	(Sweden) SWE	Tim Hansson
19	FW	(Sweden) SWE	Samir Zadran
20	DF	(Sweden) SWE	Max Andersson Sääf
22	GK	(Sweden) SWE	Tobias Elofsson
23	DF	(Sweden) SWE	Oscar Vilas Nilsson
24	DF	(Sweden) SWE	Axel Olin
99	GK	(Sweden) SWE	Martin Hultman

=== Reserve team squad ===
As of 2011-04-20 Note: Flags indicate national team as defined under FIFA eligibility rules; some limited exceptions apply. Players may hold more than one non-FIFA nationality.

No.	Pos.	Nation	Player
55	GK	(Sweden) SWE	Viktor Nilsson
2	DF	(Sweden) SWE	Joakim Järpell
-	MF	(Sweden) SWE	Robin Kristoffersson
3	DF	(Sweden) SWE	Niklas Olausson
5	DF	(Sweden) SWE	Petter Landén
6	MF	(Sweden) SWE	Dominique Egli
7	MF	(Sweden) SWE	Antonio Almeida
8	FW	(Sweden) SWE	Robin Bylund
9	DF	(Sweden) SWE	Christoffer Andersson
-	FW	(Sweden) SWE	André Andersson
-	MF	(Sweden) SWE	Omar Aldulaimi
10	MF	(Sweden) SWE	Johan Sonesson

No.	Pos.	Nation	Player
-	MF	(Sweden) SWE	Robin Andersson
-	MF	(Sweden) SWE	Per Bengtsson
16	FW	(Sweden) SWE	Rasmus Norin
-	MF	(Sweden) SWE	Vedat Latifov
-	DF	(Sweden) SWE	Nawid Rahmanzai
19	MF	(Sweden) SWE	Jonas Lindskog
20	FW	(Sweden) SWE	Martin Körner
-	MF	(Sweden) SWE	Shamir Zabbar
-	FW	(Sweden) SWE	Patrik Hilveus
-	GK	(Sweden) SWE	Michel Malmström
-	MF	(Sweden) SWE	Marcus Fernlid

== Technical staff ==
As of 18 April 2018

Name	Role
(Sweden) Ulf Jansson	Manager
(Sweden) Torbjörn Sjöholm	Assistant Manager
(Sweden) Peter Andersson	Assistant Manager
(Sweden) Per Runfors	Goalkeeping coach
(Sweden) Lasse Göransson	First team coach
(Sweden) Filip Qvist	Physiotherapist
(Sweden) Robert Petrow	Kit Man
