= Old town =

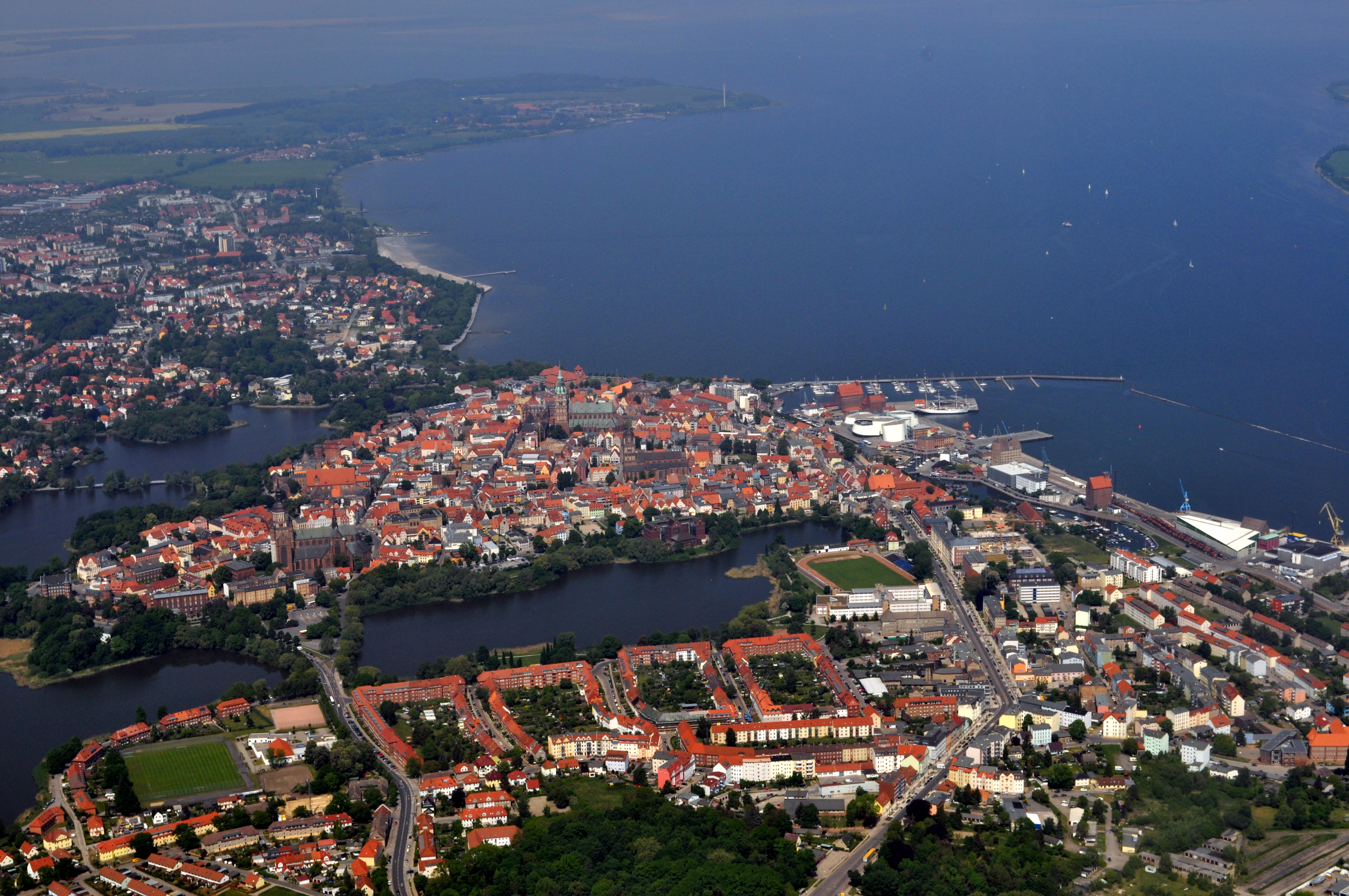
Stralsund in Germany, an old town designated a World Heritage Site by UNESCO. European old towns are often recognizable by their density, small alleys and buildings of different eras.

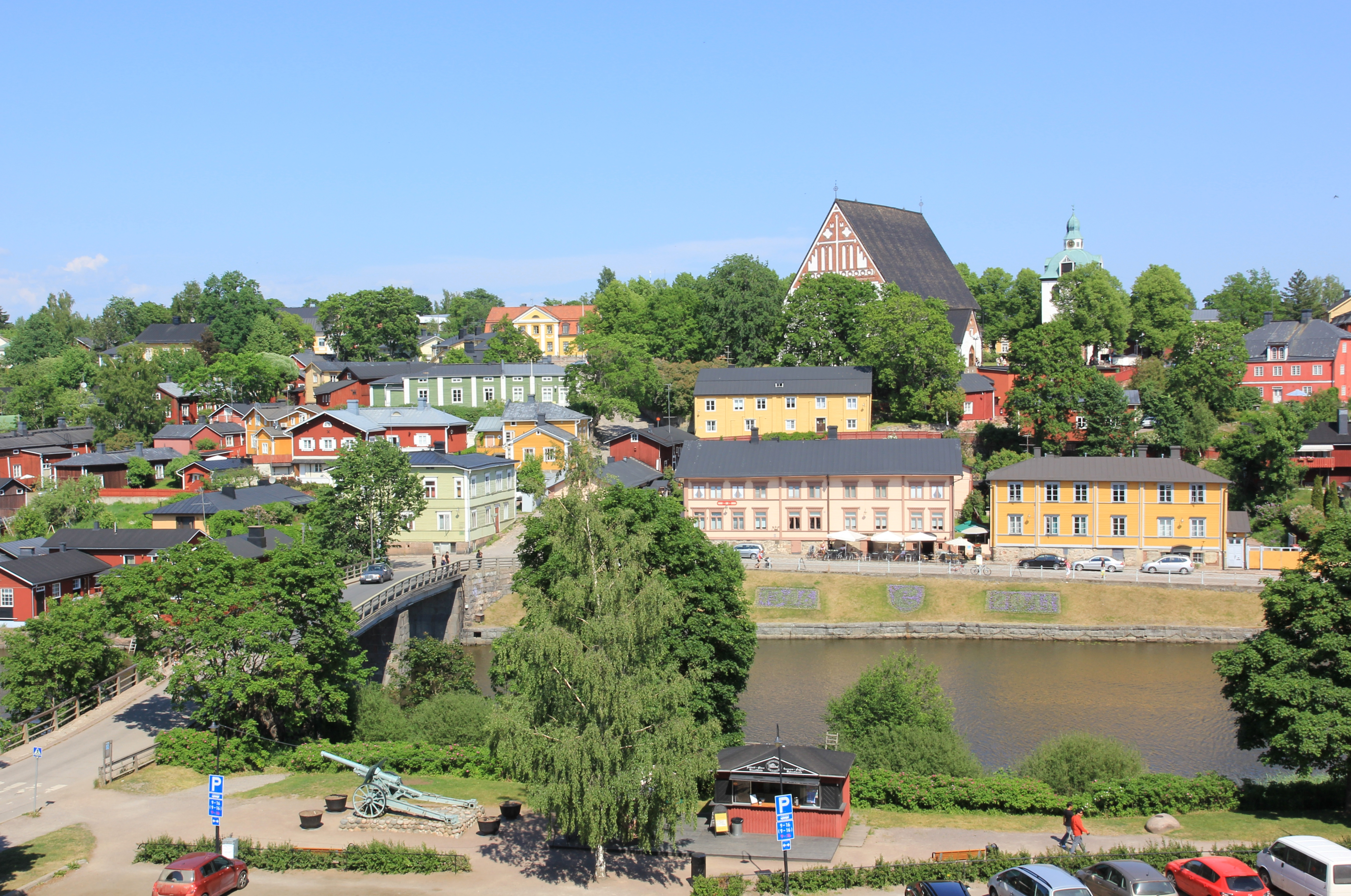
The medieval old town of Porvoo on the Porvoonjoki river, Finland

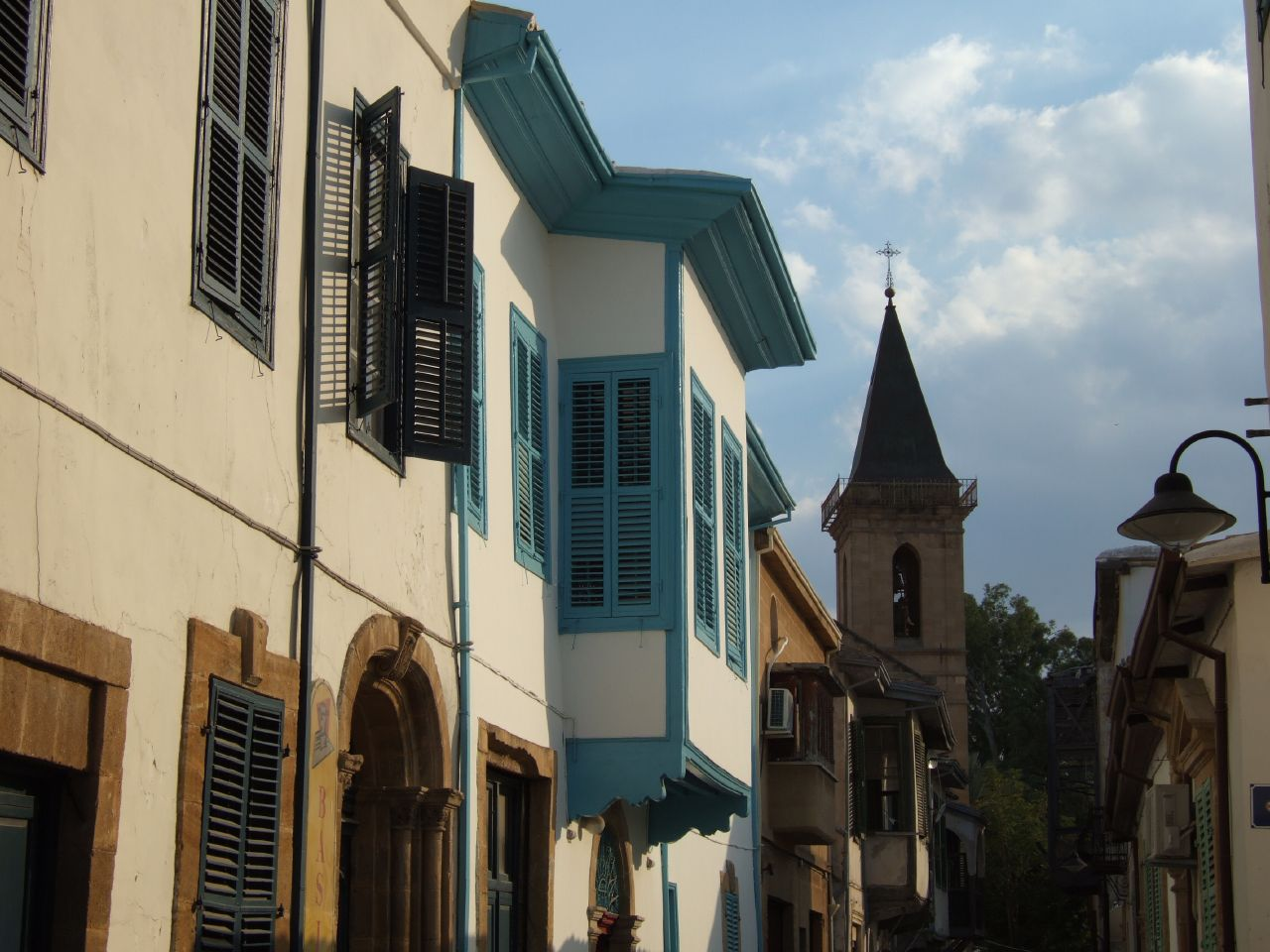
Traditional houses, with the Roman Catholic Church of the Holy Cross in the background, in the walled city of Nicosia, Cyprus

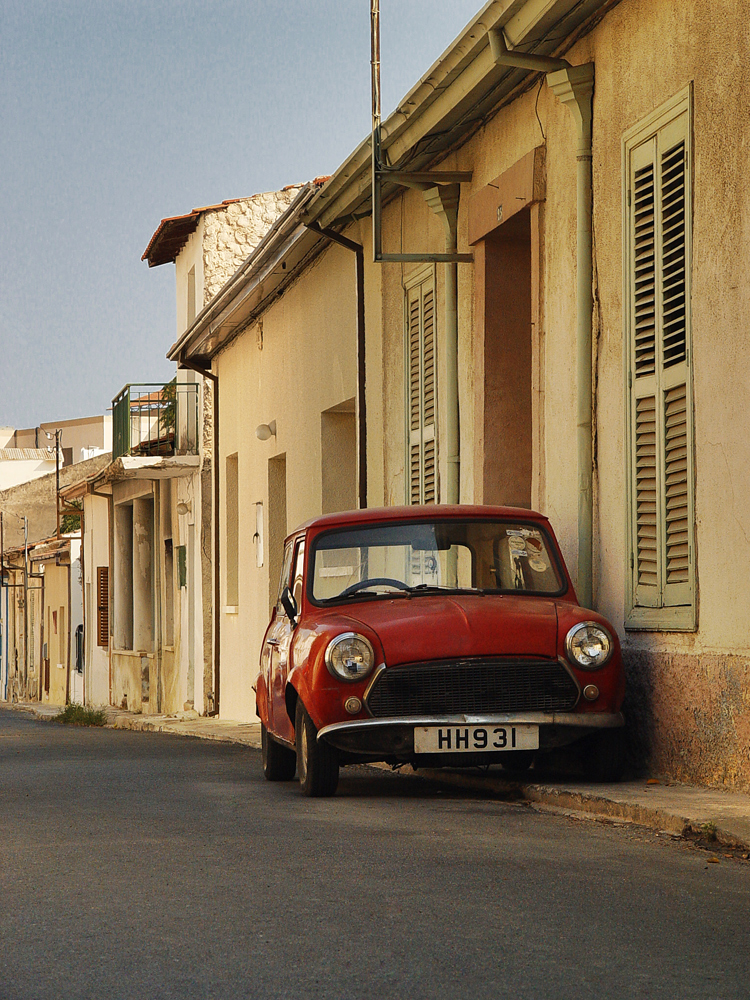
A street in the old town of Limassol, Cyprus

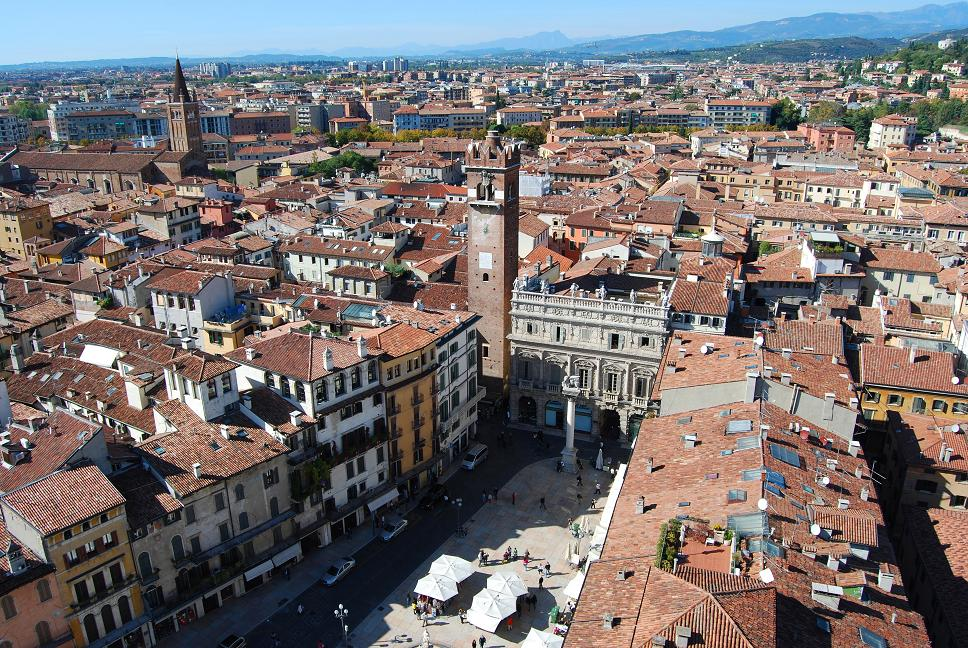
Historical centre of Verona, Italy

In a city or town, the old town is its historic or original core. Although the city is usually larger in its present form, many cities have redesignated this part of the city to commemorate its origins. In some cases, newer developments on the periphery of the original settlement may have become the town's principal commercial, administrative or residential hub, leaving the historic "old town" as a secondary focus. There are many places throughout the world referred to as the old town (sometimes construed as a proper noun and capitalized). This is a list of some famous old towns:

== Africa ==
=== Algeria ===
- Casbah of Algiers, UNESCO World Heritage Site
- Old Town of Constantine
- Old Town of Oran
- Old Béjaïa
- Old Tlemcen

=== Egypt ===
- Medieval Cairo, in Cairo, UNESCO World Heritage Site
- Old Rashid
- Old Town of Alexandria

=== Ethiopia ===
- Old Town of Harar, UNESCO World Heritage Site

=== Ivory Coast ===
- Historic Town of Grand-Bassam, UNESCO World Heritage Site

=== Kenya ===
- Lamu Old Town, UNESCO World Heritage Site
- Mombasa Old Town

=== Libya ===
- Old Town of Ghadamès, UNESCO World Heritage Site
- Old Tripoli
- Old Misrata

=== Mali ===
- Historic Center of Timbuktu, UNESCO World Heritage Site

=== Morocco ===
- Old Meknes, UNESCO World Heritage Site
- Old Essaouira, UNESCO World Heritage Site
- Old Fes, UNESCO World Heritage Site
- Old Marrakesh, UNESCO World Heritage Site
- Tétouan, UNESCO World Heritage Site
- El Jadida, UNESCO World Heritage Site
- Old Tangier
- Old Rabat
- Old Asilah
- Chefchaouen

=== Niger ===
- Historic Center of Agadez, UNESCO World Heritage Site

=== Senegal ===
- Historic Center of Saint-Louis, UNESCO World Heritage Site

=== Tanzania/Zanzibar ===
- Stone Town in Zanzibar City, UNESCO World Heritage Site

=== Tunisia ===
- Old Kairouan, UNESCO World Heritage Site
- Medina of Sousse, UNESCO World Heritage Site
- Medina of Tunis, UNESCO World Heritage Site
- Old Sfax

== Asia and the Pacific ==
=== Australia ===
- Old Town of Ballarat
- Old Beechworth
- Old Town of Fitzroy
- Historic center of Sydney (The Rocks, Newtown)
- Historic center of Melbourne (CBD)
- Historic center of Hobart
- Historic center of Adelaide

=== Bangladesh ===
- Old Town in Dhaka, Old Dhaka
- Sonargaon

=== Cambodia ===
- French Quarter of Phnom Penh
- French Quarter of Siem Reap
- French Quarter of Kampot

=== China ===
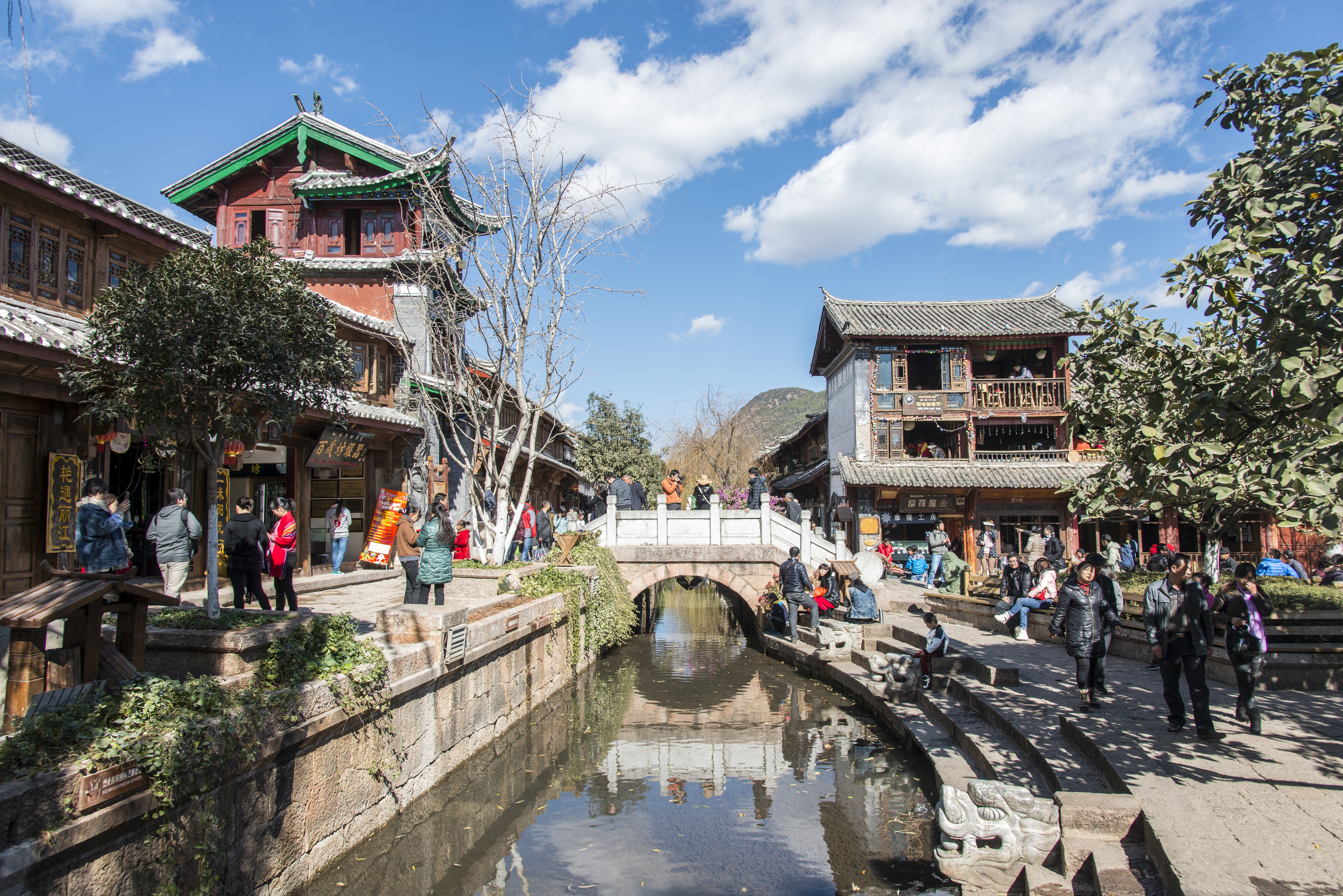
Old Town of Lijiang

==== UNESCO World Heritage Sites ====
- Historical centers of Xidi and Hongcun
- Forbidden City and Old Town remnants of Beijing
- Mountain Resort temple town in Chengde
- Old Town of Pingyao
- Old Town of Lijiang
- Old Town of Qufu
- Old Town of Kaiping
- Historic Centre of Macau
- Gulangyu

==== East China ====
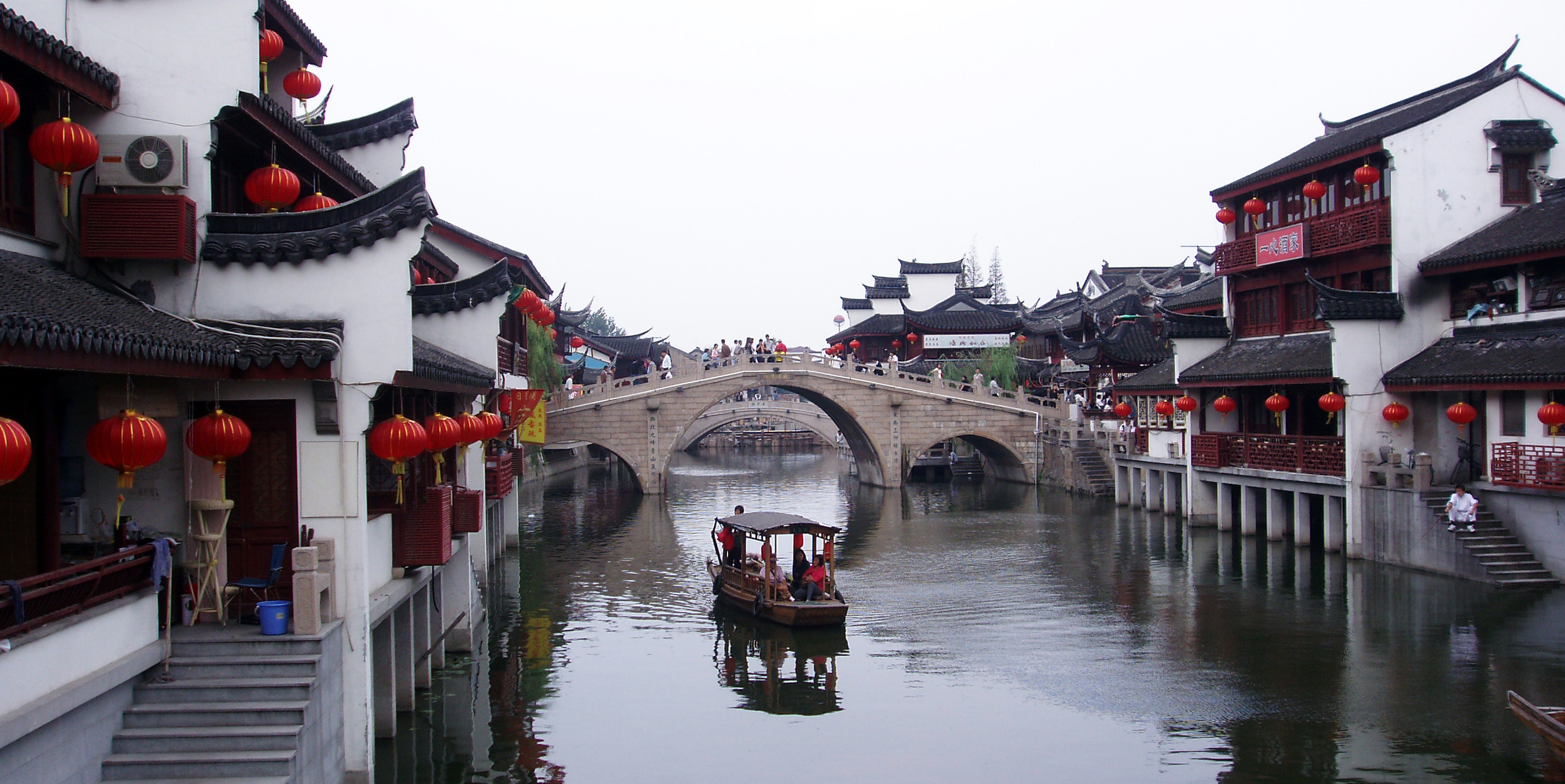
Old Town of Qibao

- Old Sanfang Qixiang
- Old Town of Yongding
- Ancient Town of Shaoxing
- Ancient Town of Wuzhen
- Ancient Town of Qibao
- Ancient Town of Fengjing
- Ancient Town of Nanxun
- Ancient Town of Xitang
- Ancient Town of Zhujiajiao
- Ancient Town of Qiandeng
- Ancient Town of Jinxi
- Ancient Town of Luzhi
- Ancient Town of Zhouzhuang
- Ancient Town of Tongli
- Ancient Town of Mudu
- Ancient Town of Suzhou
- Ancient Town of Tunxi
- Walled old town area of Nanjing

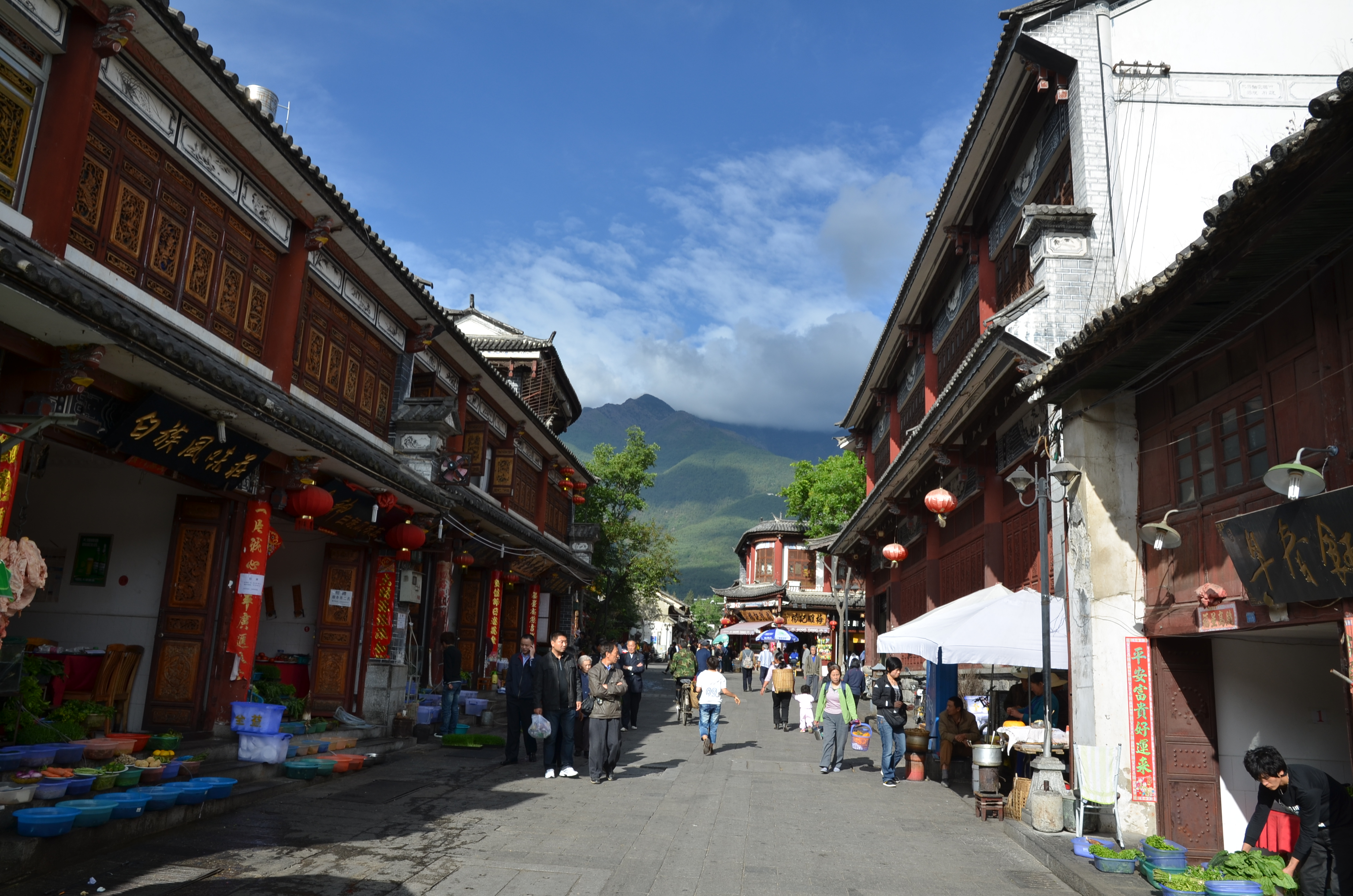
Street in the Dali Ancient City

==== Southwestern China ====
- Old Town and Potala Palace of Lhasa
- Dali Ancient City
- Pingle Ancient Town
- Heshun
- Ancient Town of Zhenyuan
- Ancient Town of Ciqikou
- Ancient Town of Lizhuang
- Ancient Town of Liujiangzhen
- Ancient Town of Shangli
- Ancient Town of Luodai
- Ancient Town of Jiezi

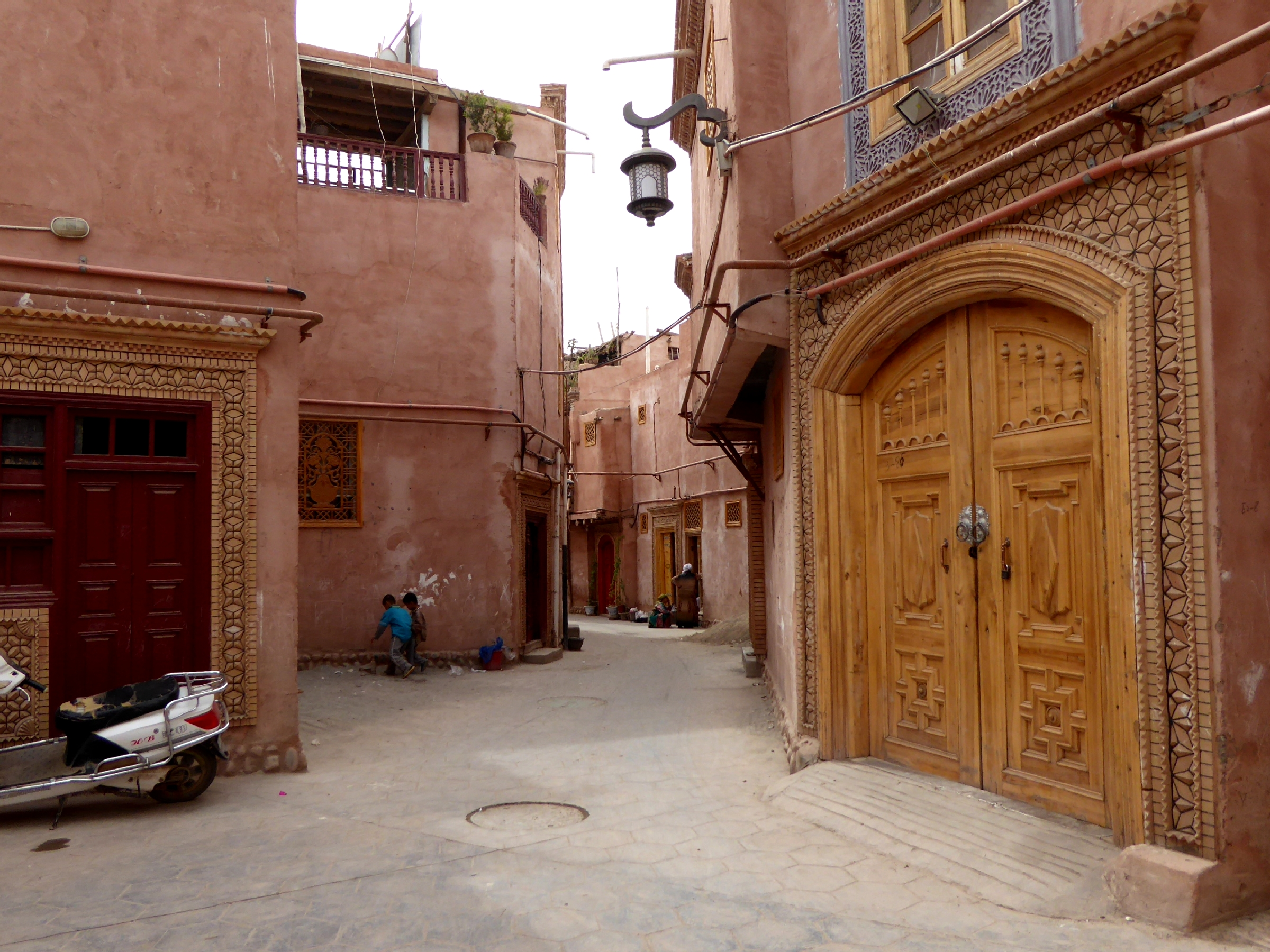
Street in the Old Town of Kashgar

==== Northwestern China ====
- Qingmuchuan Ancient Town
- Old Town of Kashgar

==== South Central China ====
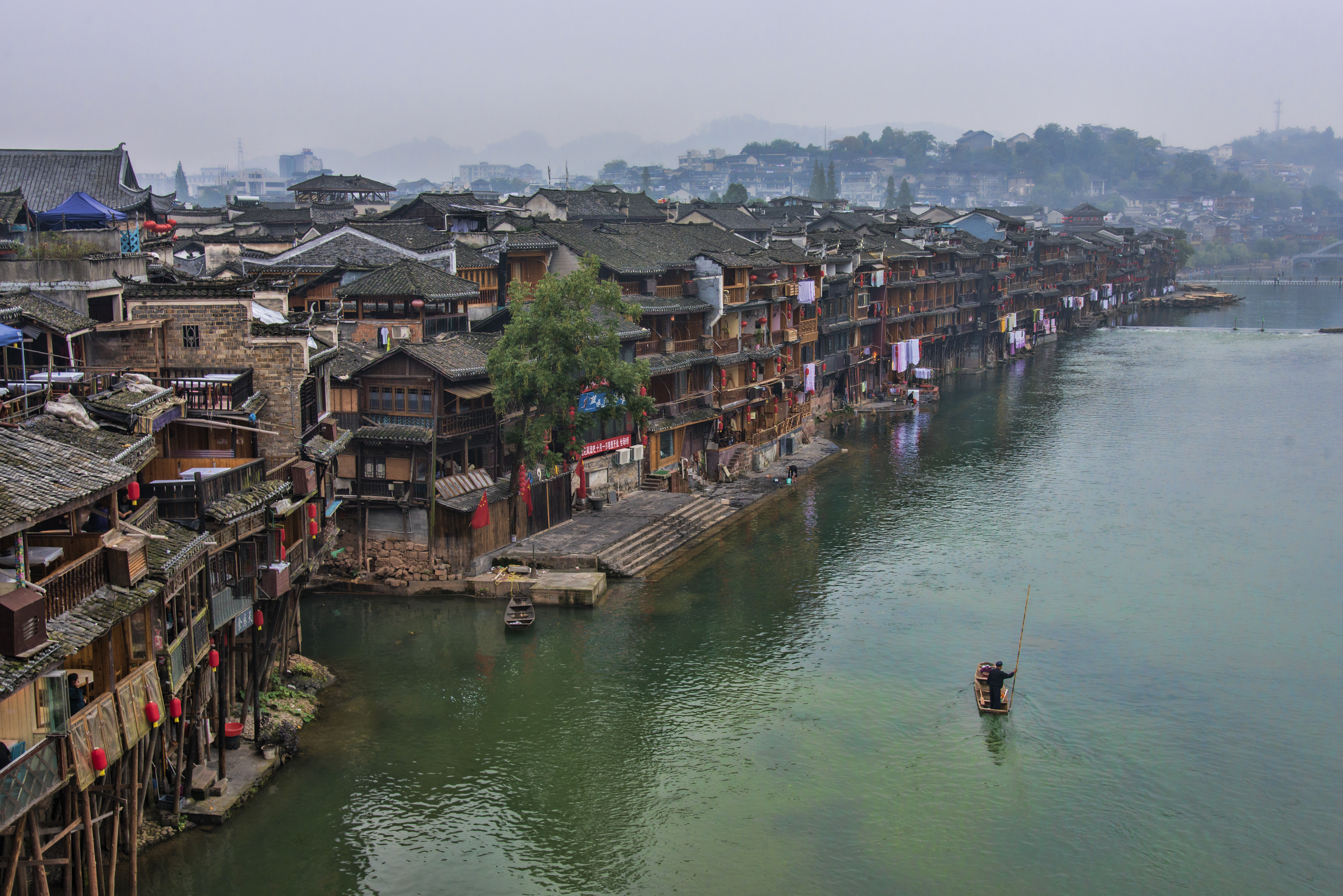
Fenghuang Ancient Town

- Old Town of Dengfeng
- Yangmei Ancient Town
- Huangyao Ancient Town
- Fenghuang Ancient Town
- Ancient Town of Liye
- Ancient Town of Furong
- Ancient Town of Luoyang
- Ancient Town of Xijiang

==== Northeast China ====
- Old Town of Harbin

=== Fiji ===
- Levuka

=== India ===
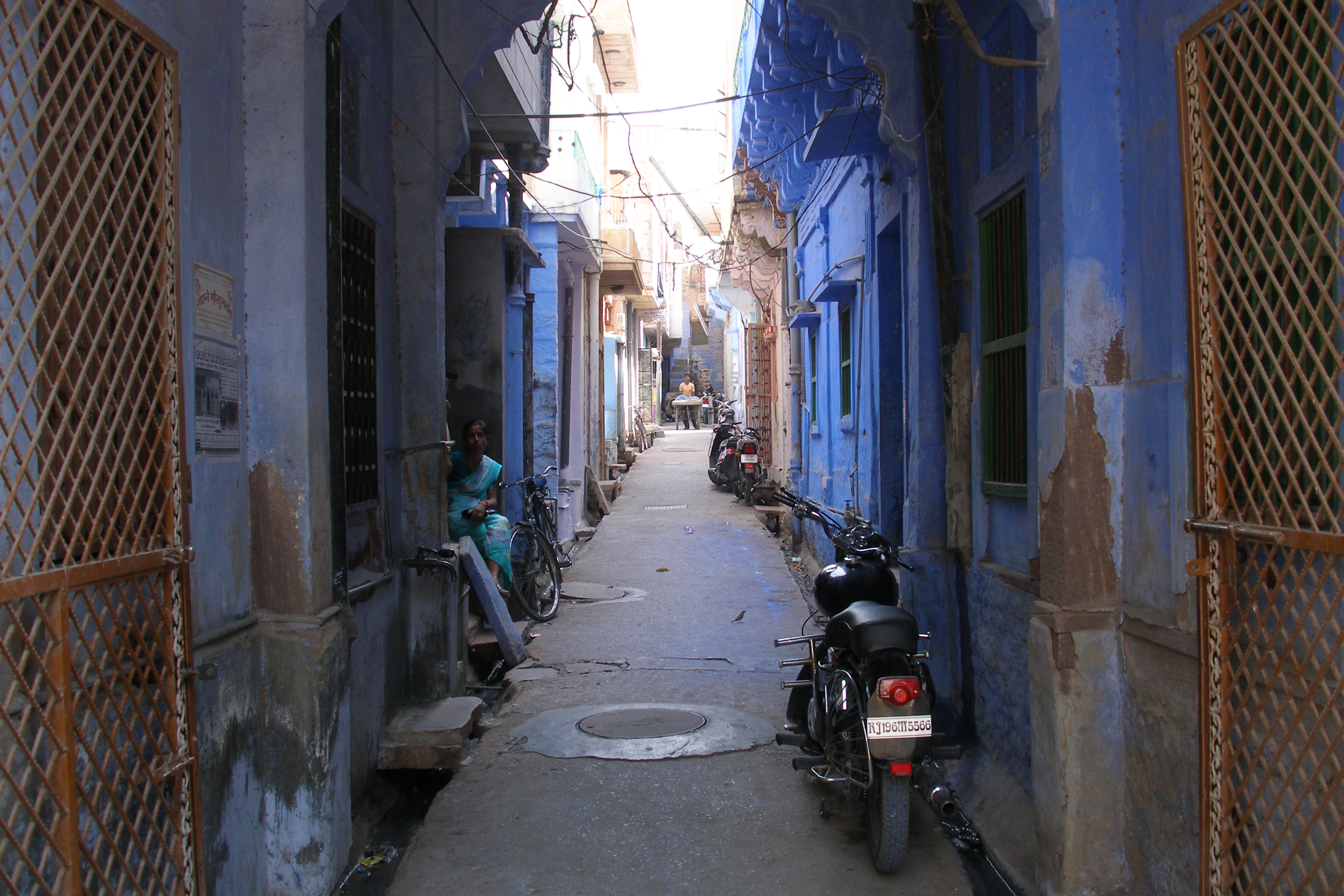
Streets of Jodhpur, India

- Old Town and monuments of Agra
- Historic City of Ahmadabad, UNESCO World Heritage Site
- Historical center of Alchi
- Historical center of Amritsar
- Budaun
- Havelis of Bundi
- Havelis of Bikaner
- Champaner, UNESCO World Heritage Site
- Old Delhi
- Fatehpur Sikri, UNESCO World Heritage Site
- Old Goa, UNESCO World Heritage Site
- Historical center of Gwalior
- Hampi
- Historical center of Hyderabad
- Old Town of Jaipur, UNESCO World Heritage Site
- Jaisalmer Fort
- Old Town of Jaunpur, Uttar Pradesh
- Old Town of Jodhpur
- Kalna City
- Kanadukathan and other towns of Chettinad
- Historical center of Kochi
- Originally from the Lal Dighi to the Hooghly River in the historic B. B. D. Bagh of Kolkata
- Kuldhara
- Kumbakonam
- Leh Old Town
- Old Town of Lucknow
- Havelis of Mandawa
- Maheshwar
- Old Town of Murshidabad
- Havelis of Nawalgarh
- Orchha
- Osian, Jodhpur
- Historic districts of Patna
- Havelis of Phalodi
- Pushkar
- Historical center of Puducherry
- Historical ruined center of Mandu
- Historical centre and Fort of Mumbai
- Siddhpur
- Old Town of Srinagar
- Old Town and palace of Udaipur
- Old Town of Varanasi

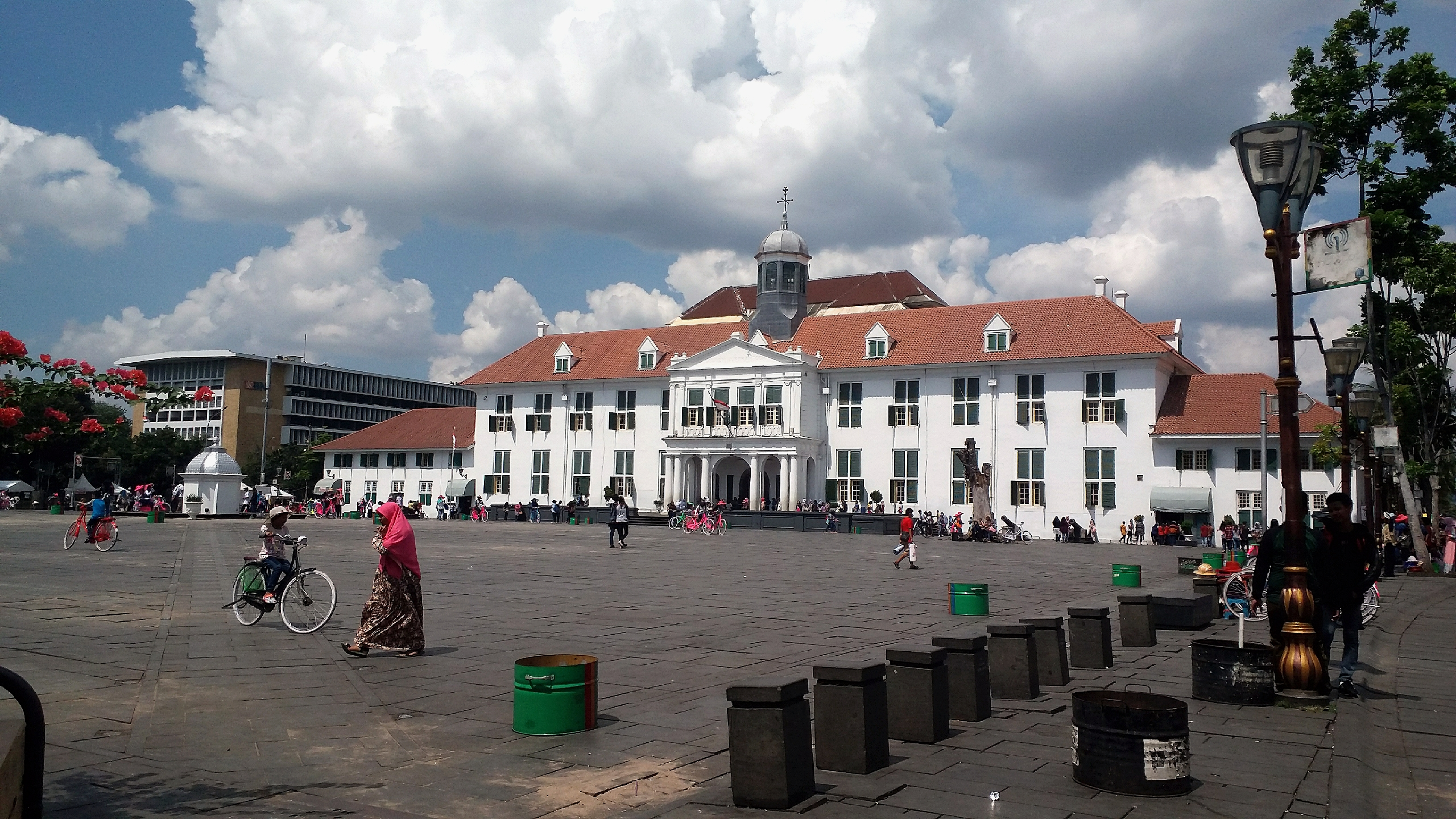
The Stadhuis is an old building in Jakarta Old Town

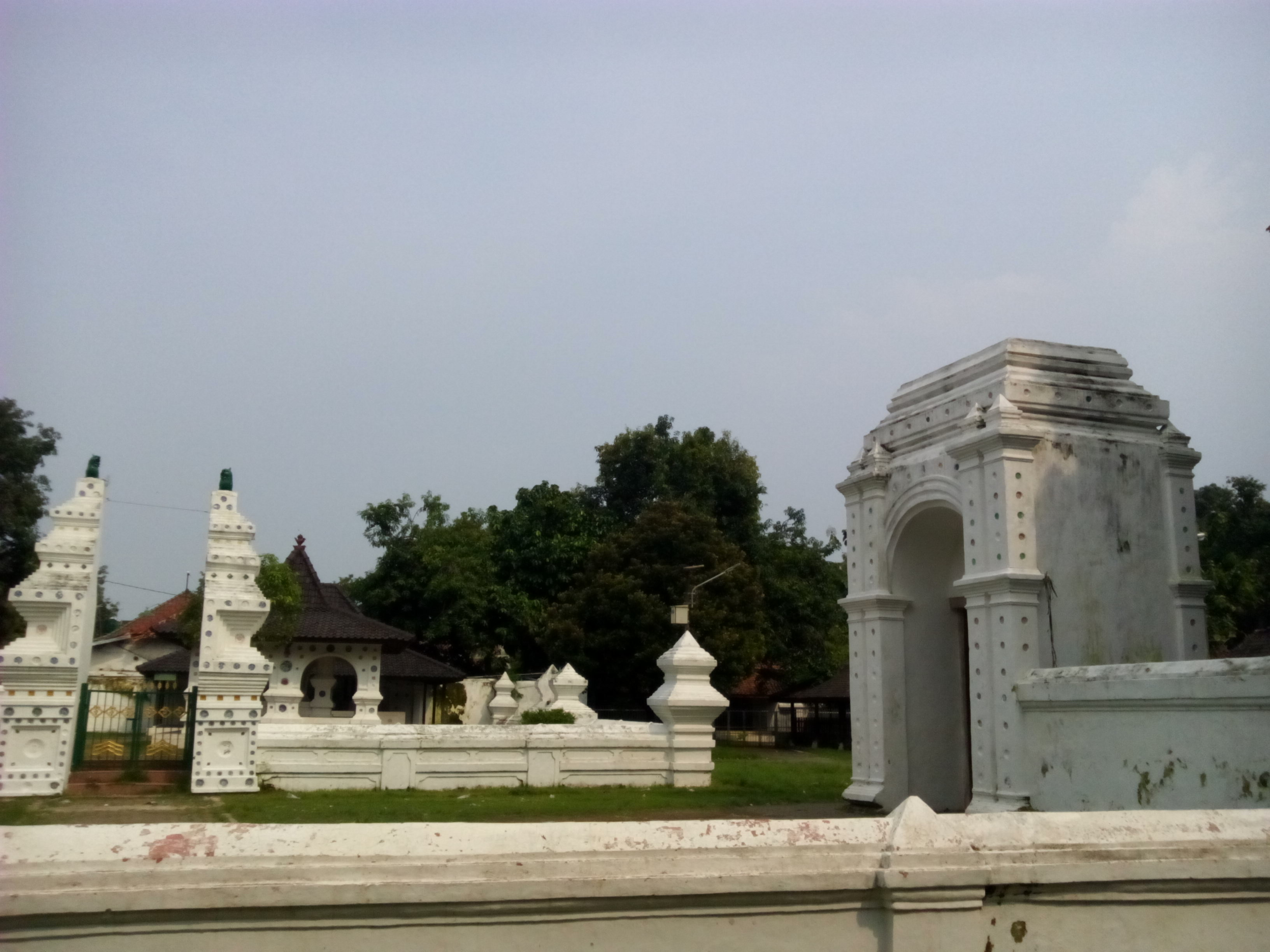
Keraton Kanoman is one of the oldest buildings in the historic town of Cirebon

=== Indonesia ===
- Ancient City of Banten
- Old Town of Jakarta, within and 4 Outlying Islands (Onrust, Kelor, Cipir dan Bidadari)
- Old Town of Semarang
- Old Town of Padang
- Depok Lama (Old Town of Depok)
- Historic City of Surabaya
- Historic City of Bandung
- Historic City of Medan
- Historic City of Malang
- Historical Monuments of City of Ternate
- Historical Monuments of Banda Neira
- Historical Monuments of Padalarang
- Historical Monuments of City Tidore
- Historical City Center of Yogyakarta
- Historical City Center of Tegal
- Old Mining Town Of Sawahlunto
- Old City of Banyumas
- Old City of Banjarmasin
- Old City of Bukittinggi
- Old City of Jambi
- Historical District of Lasem
- Historical District of Ampenan
- Historic Center of Solo (Surakarta)
- Historic Town of Cirebon
- Historic Center of Palembang
- Historic Town of Bogor
- Chinatown of Bengkulu (Kampung Cina Bengkulu)

=== Japan ===
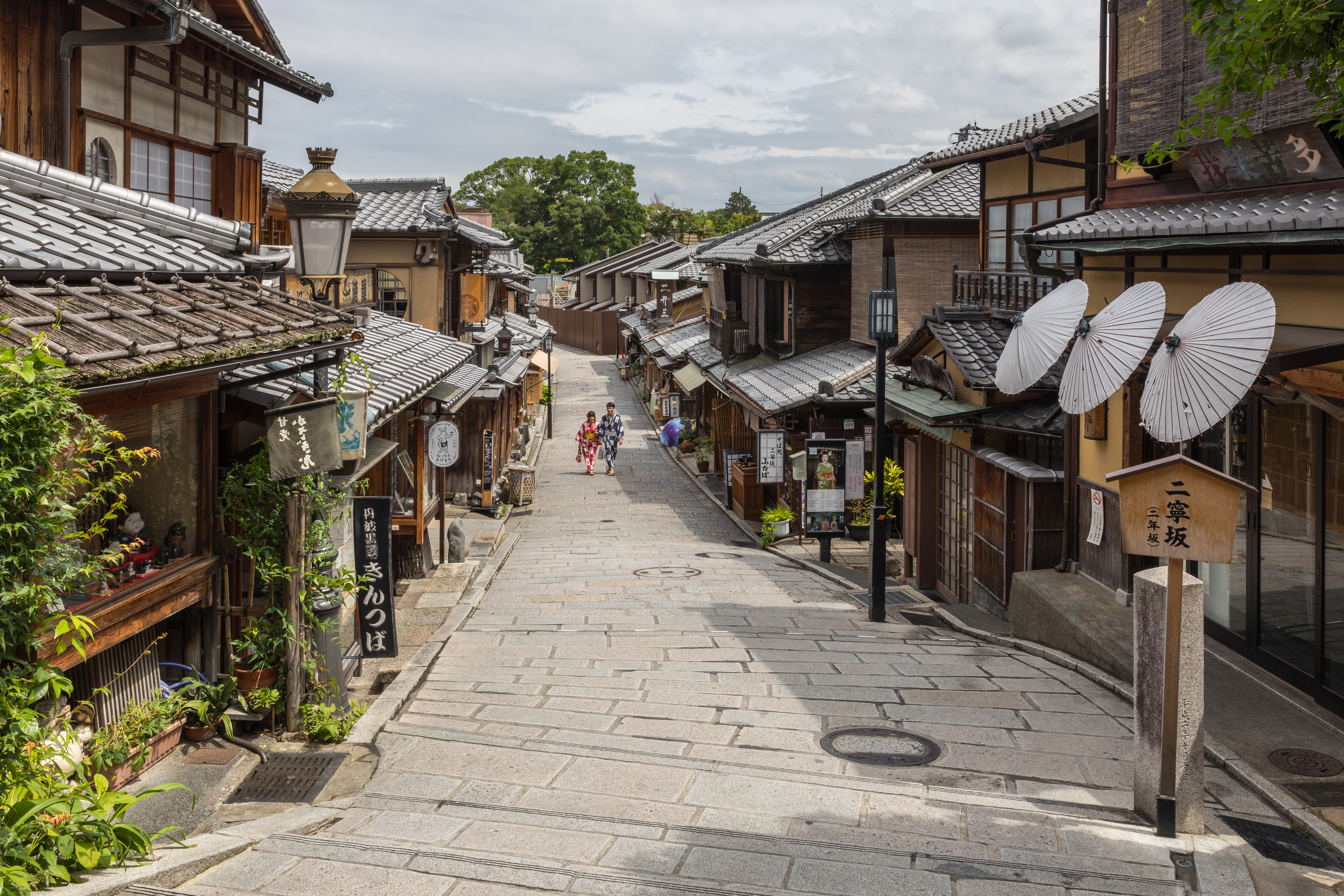
Old Kyoto

==== UNESCO World Heritage Sites ====
- Historic center of Kyoto (Gion and Higashiyama districts)
- Historic centers of Shirakawa-gō and Gokayama

==== Chūbu ====
- Samurai district of Kanazawa (Nagamachi)
- Geisha district of Kanazawa (Higashi Chaya)
- Magome Post Town
- Matsumoto Nakamachi Merchant District
- Narai Post Town
- Tsumago Post Town
- Takayama Merchant District

==== Chūgoku ====
- Hagi Former Castle Town
- Mitarai Historic Townscape
- Kurashiki Bikan Historical Quarter
- Tomonoura Port Town
- Fukiya Merchant District
- Matsue Samurai District
- Yunotsu Onsen Port Town

==== Kansai ====
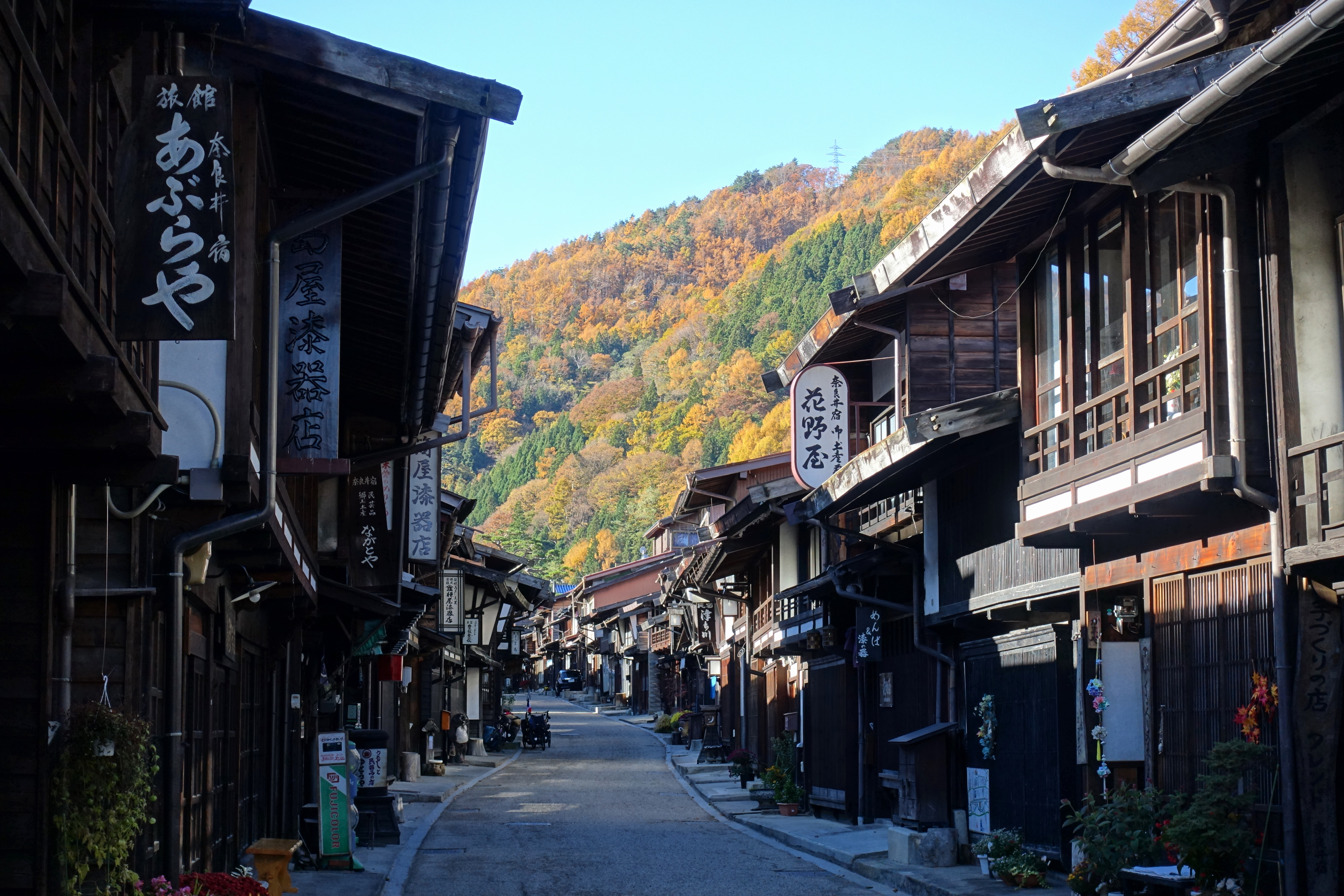
Post town of Narai

- Imaicho Merchant Town
- Naramachi Merchant District
- Miyama Farming Town
- Ine Port Town
- Omihachiman
- Oharaimachi

==== Kantō ====
- Sawara Merchant District
- Kawagoe Warehouse District

==== Kyushu ====
- Kitsuki Samurai District
- Usuki Samurai District
- Taketomi Island
- Misumi West Port Town

==== Shikoku ====
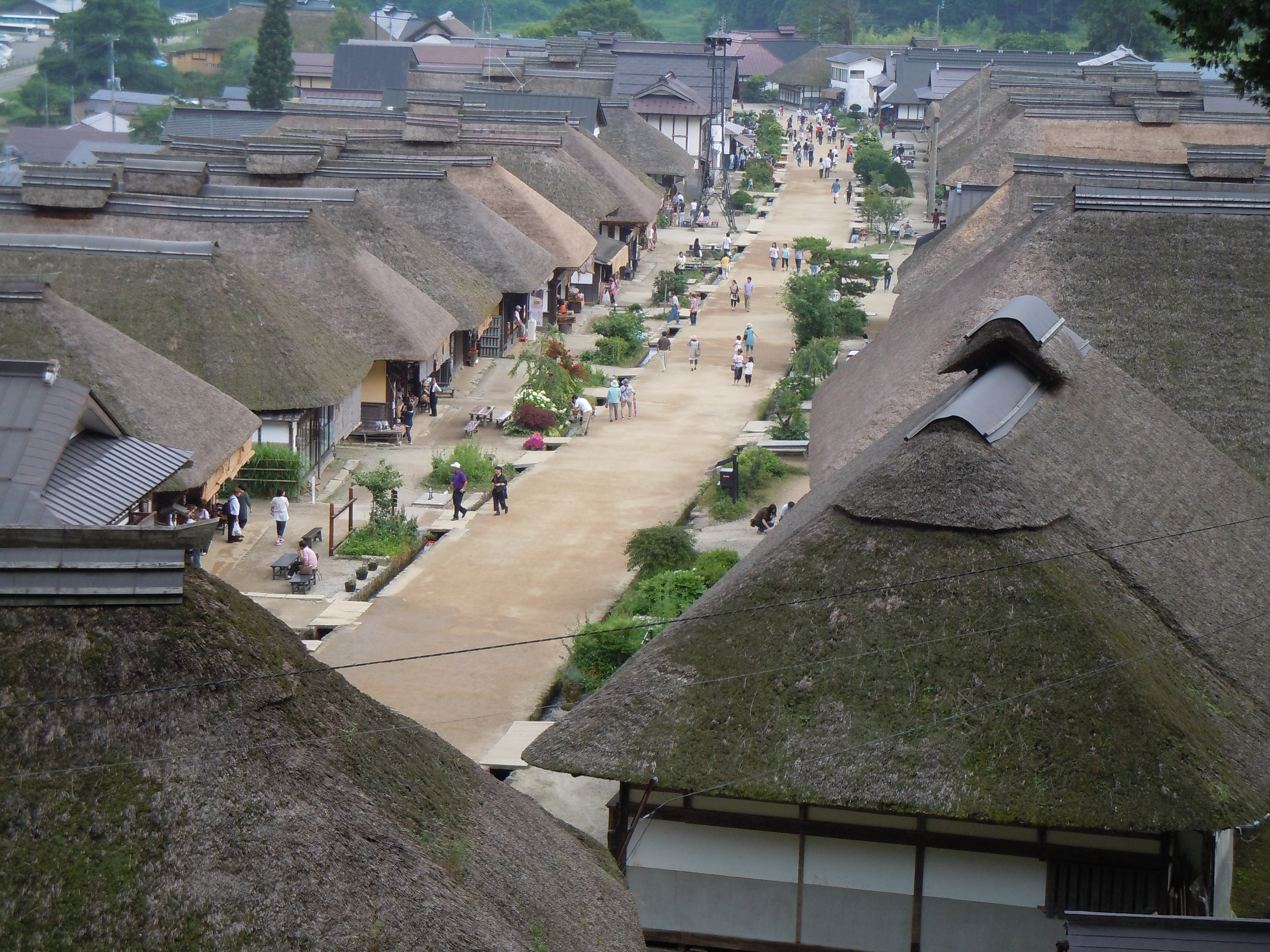
View on Ouchijuku from above

- Yokaichi Merchant District
- Kasashima Port Town

==== Tōhoku ====
- Ouchijuku Post Town
- Kakunodate Samurai District

=== Malaysia ===
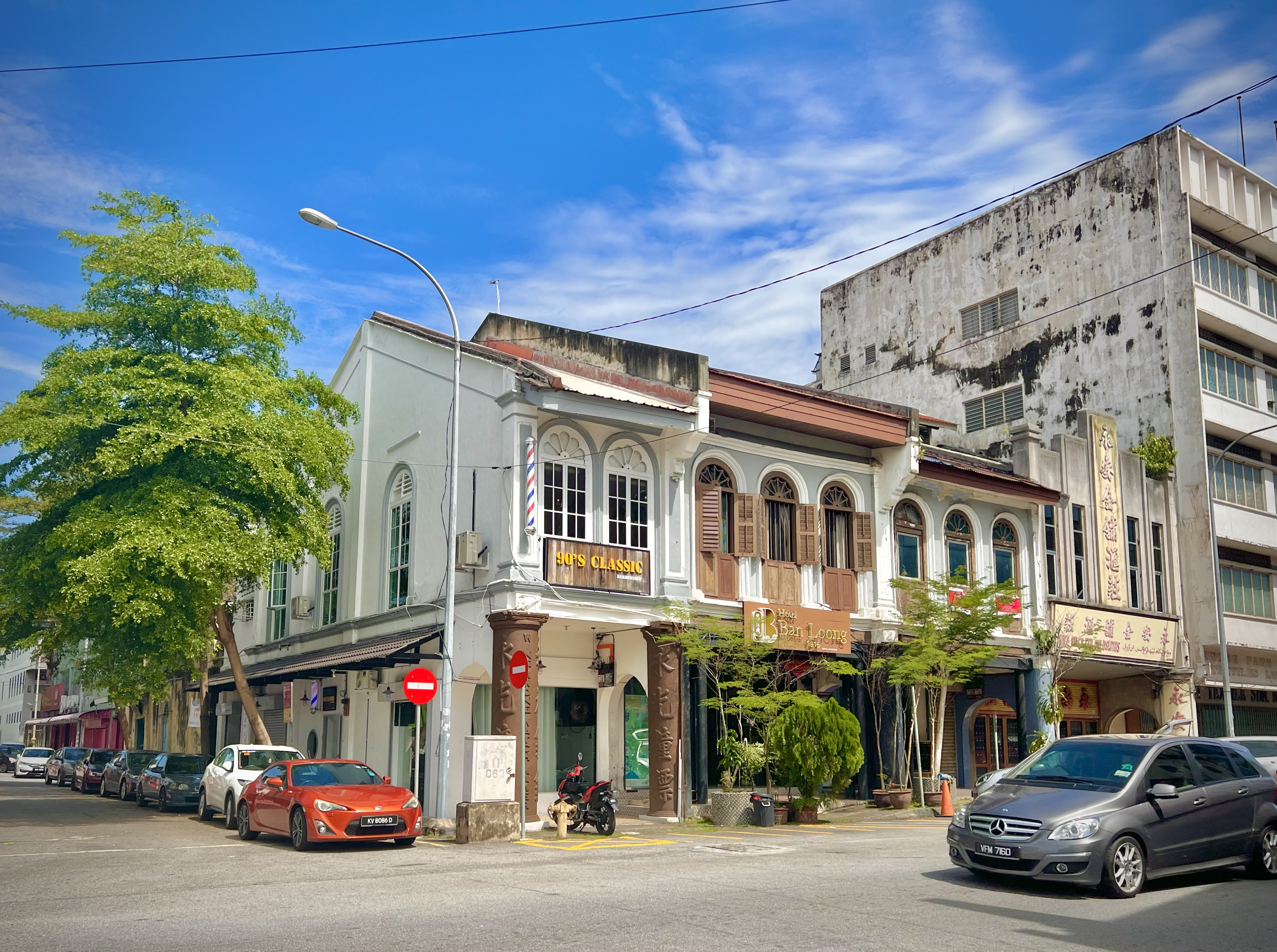
Old Town of Ipoh

- Historic center of George Town, UNESCO World Heritage Site
- Historic center of Malacca, UNESCO World Heritage Site
- Old Town of Kuala Lumpur
- Old Town of Alor Setar
- Old Town of Ipoh
- Old Town of Petaling Jaya
- Old Town of Miri
- Old Town of Taiping
- Old Town of Kuala Kangsar
- Old Town of Bentong
- Old Town of Gopeng
- Old Town of Kuala Terengganu
- Old Town of Muar
- Old Town of Batu Pahat
- Old Town of Kuala Kubu Bharu
- Old Town of Kuala Selangor
- Old Town of Lumut
- Chinatown of Kuching

=== Myanmar ===
- Historic center of Yangon
- Old Bagan, UNESCO World Heritage Site

=== Nepal ===
- Old Town and Durbar Square of Kathmandu, UNESCO World Heritage Site
- Old Town and Durbar Square of Bhaktapur
- Old Town and Durbar Square of Lalitpur
- Kirtipur

=== New Zealand ===
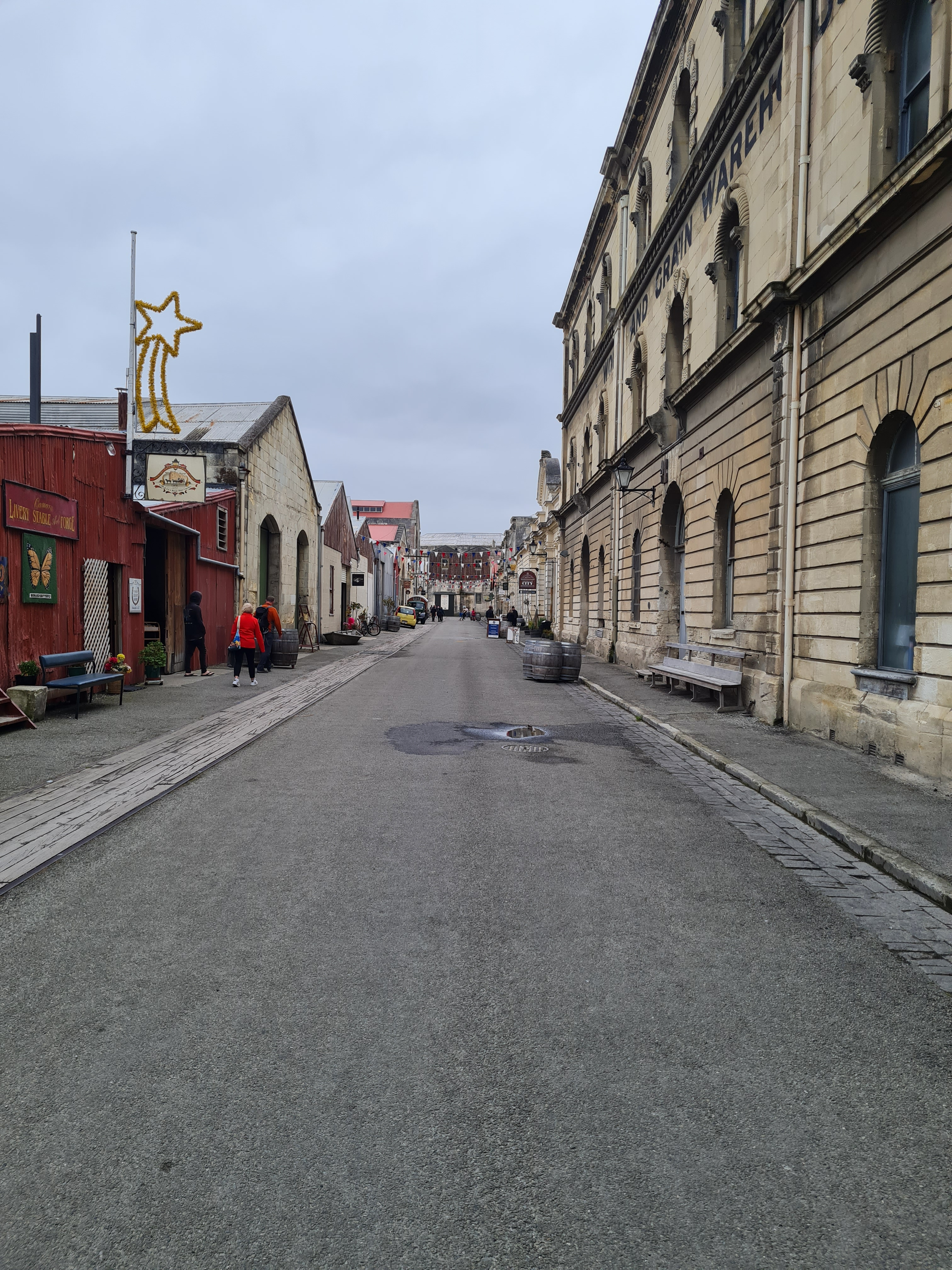
Oamaru historic district

- Old Town of Napier
- Historic center of Wellington
- Historic town of Feilding
- Historic town of Russell
- Historic town of Arrowtown
- Old Oamaru

=== Pakistan ===
- Walled City of Lahore, Punjab
- Sethi Mohallah of Peshawar, Khyber Pakhtunkhwa
- Old City of Multan, Punjab

=== Philippines ===
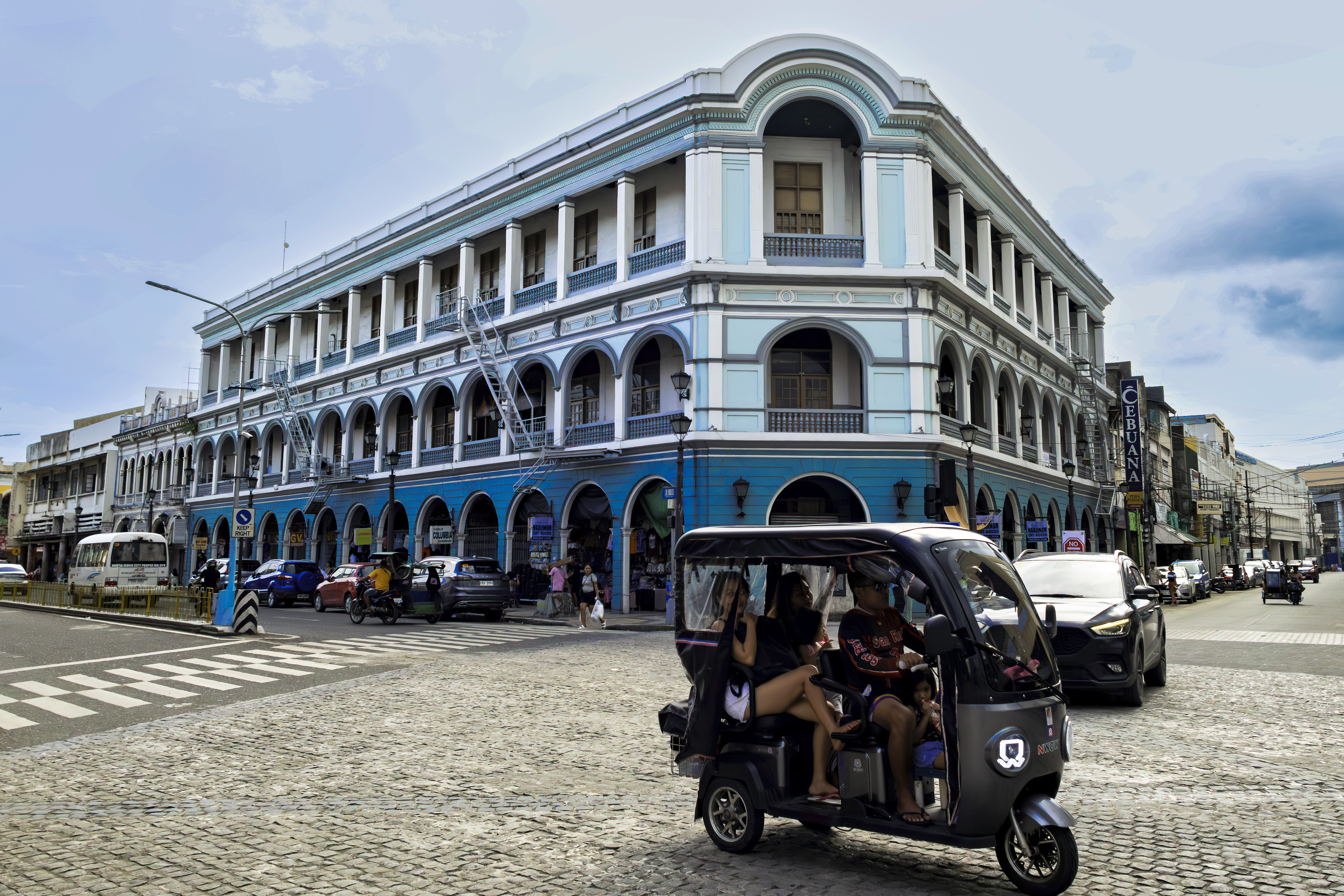
Calle Real in the Old Town of Iloilo

Philippines as the former colony of Spain has numerous heritage structures, most notably in:

- Old Town remnants of Intramuros in Manila
- Old Town of Vigan, UNESCO World Heritage Site
- Old Town of Malolos
- Old Town of San Fernando
- Old Town of Pila
- Old Town of Taal
- Old Town of Balayan
- Old Town of Iloilo
- Old Town of Laoag
- Old Town of Loboc
- Old Town of Carcar
- Old Town of Silay
- Old Town of Baclayon
- Old Town of Dapitan

=== Singapore ===
- Chinatown, Singapore
- Little India, Singapore

=== South Korea ===
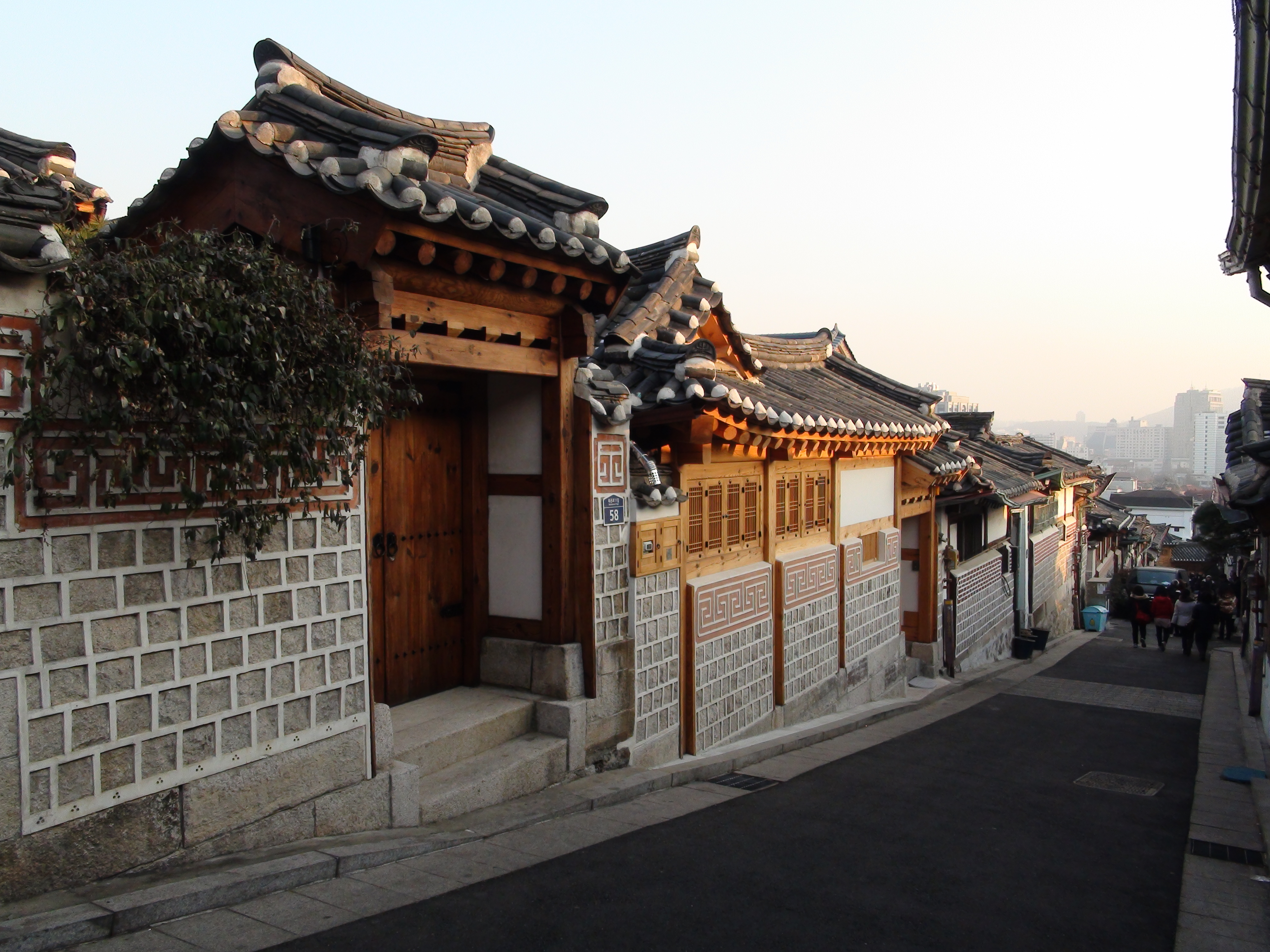
Old town (Bukchon Hanok Village) in Seoul

- Hahoe Folk Village (Andong), UNESCO World Heritage Site
- Yangdong Folk Village (Gyeongju), UNESCO World Heritage Site
- Bukchon Hanok Village (Seoul)
- Oeam Folk Village (Asan)
- Jeonju Hanok Village (Jeonju)
- Nagan Eupseong Folk Village (Nagan)

=== Taiwan ===
- Taiwan Prefecture City (Historic center of Tainan)
- Hengchun Prefecture City (Historic center of Hengchun)
- Taipeh Prefecture City (Taipei City Walls)
- Twatutia
- Monka
- Historic center of Tamsui
- Lukang
- Jioufen
- Shifen Old Street
- Sisinan Village, Taipei
- Qinbi Village, Matsu Islands

=== Thailand ===
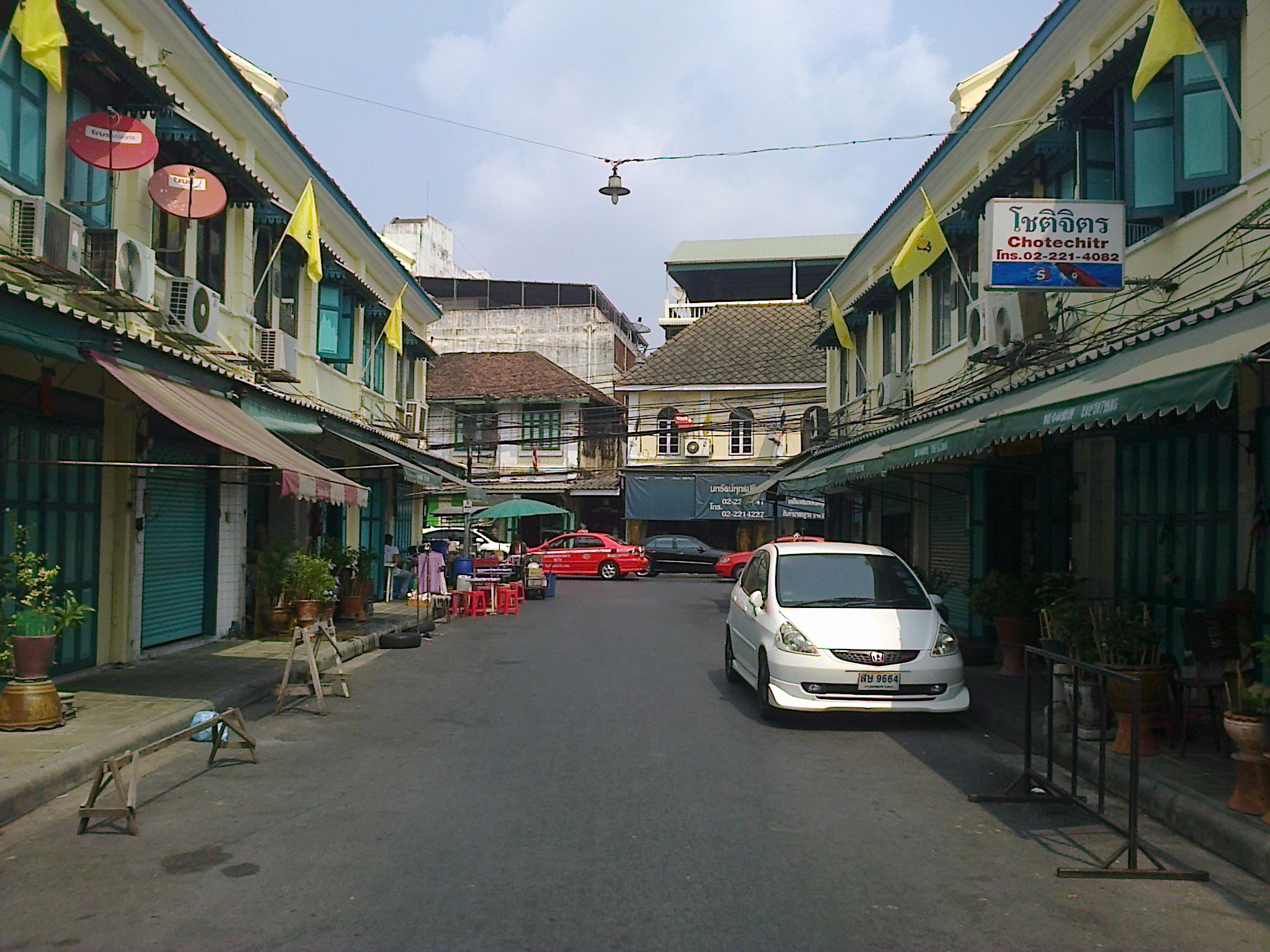
Rank of Sino-Portuguese shophouses on both sides of the road in Phraeng Phuthon of Sam Phraeng within Rattanakosin Island

- Rattanakosin Island of Bangkok
- Talat Noi and Song Wat Road of Bangkok
- Kudi Chin of Bangkok
- Ban Sing Tha of Yasothon
- Old Phuket Town of Phuket
- Chak Ngaeo of Chonburi
- Chanthaboon Riverside Community of Chanthaburi
- Chiang Khan of Loei
- Chum Saeng of Nakhon Sawan
- Tha Chalom of Samut Sakhon

=== Uzbekistan ===
- Old Tashkent
- Old Samarkand, UNESCO World Heritage Site
- Old Bukhara, UNESCO World Heritage Site
- Itchan Kala, Khiva, UNESCO World Heritage Site

=== Vietnam ===
- Old Quarter, Hanoi
- Hiến Town of Hưng Yên
- Thành Nam Old Town of Nam Định
- Thanh Hà – Bao Vinh Old Twin Cities of Huế
- Hội An Ancient Town, UNESCO World Heritage Site
- Bến Nghé of Ho Chi Minh City
- Chợ Lớn of Ho Chi Minh City

== Europe ==
=== Austria ===
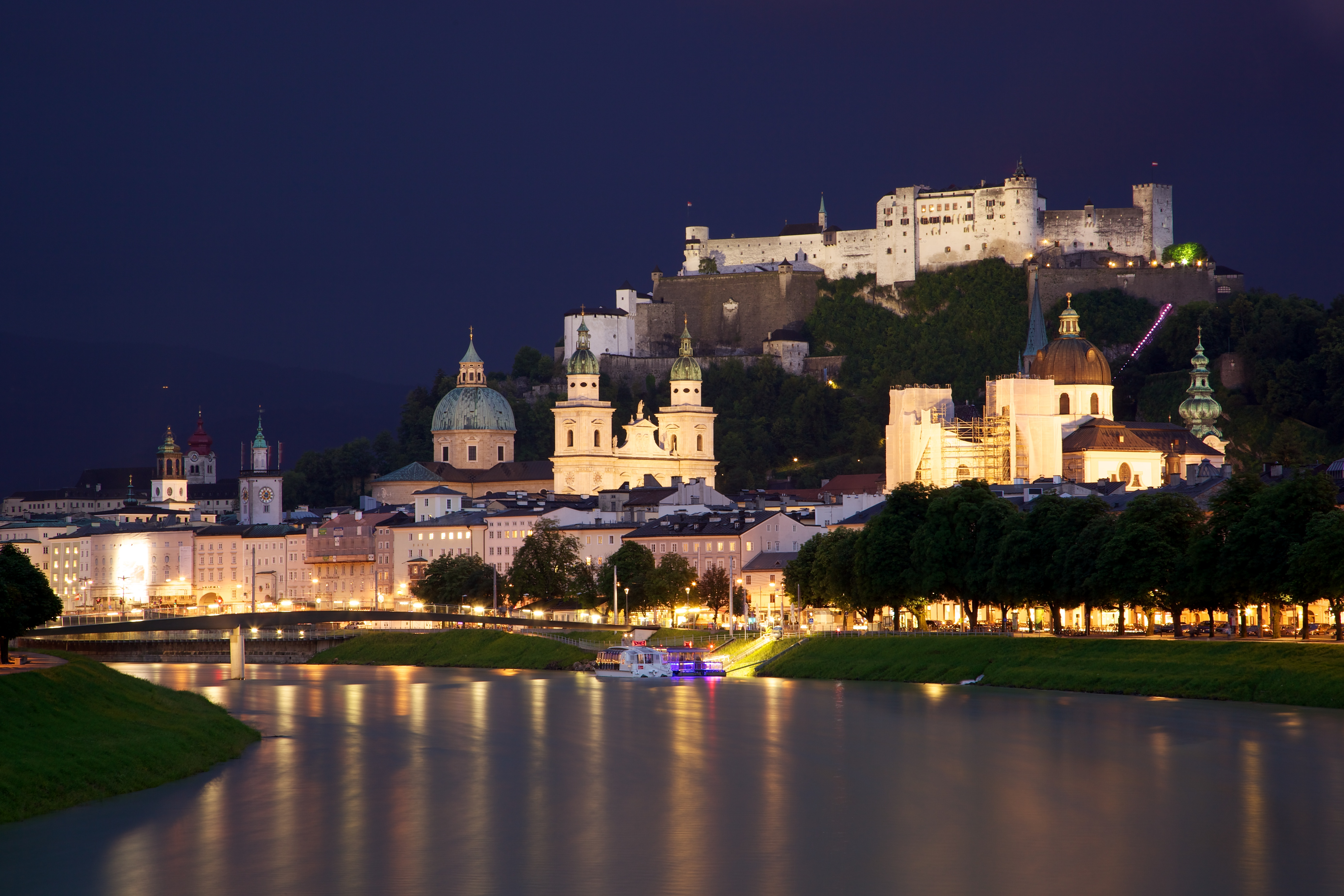
Old Town Salzburg across the Salzach river

UNESCO World Heritage old towns in Austria

- Graz (Styria)
- Krems an der Donau (Lower Austria)
- Salzburg (Salzburg), Altstadt Salzburg
- Innere Stadt (Vienna)

Other notable/famous old towns include

- Hall in Tirol (Tyrol)
- Innsbruck (Tyrol)
- Linz (Upper Austria)
- Wels (Upper Austria)
- Steyr (Upper Austria)
- Klagenfurt am Wörthersee (Carinthia)

=== Armenia ===
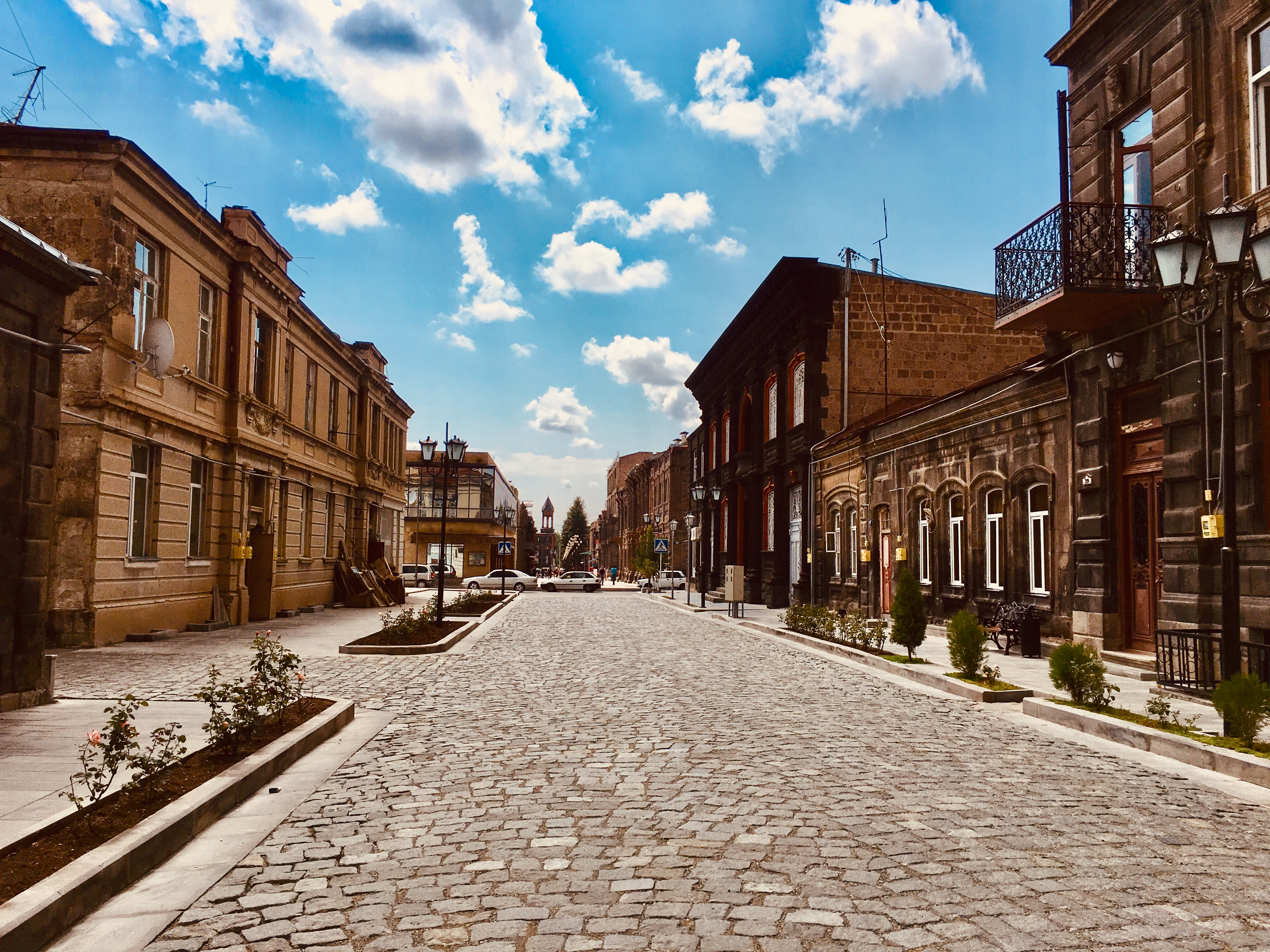
Abovyan street in the Old Town of Gyumri

- Historical Center in Vagharshapat, UNESCO World Heritage Site
- Old Town of Goris (Syunik)
- Old Khndzoresk (Syunik)
- Poqr Tagh and Mets Tagh in Meghri (Syunik)
- Old Town of Dilijan (Tavush)
- Old Town of Ashtarak (Aragatsotn)
- Kumayri in Gyumri (Shirak)
- Old Town of Tashir (Lori)
- Old Town of Tegh (Syunik)
- Kond, Old Nork and Erebuni Fortress in Yerevan

=== Albania ===
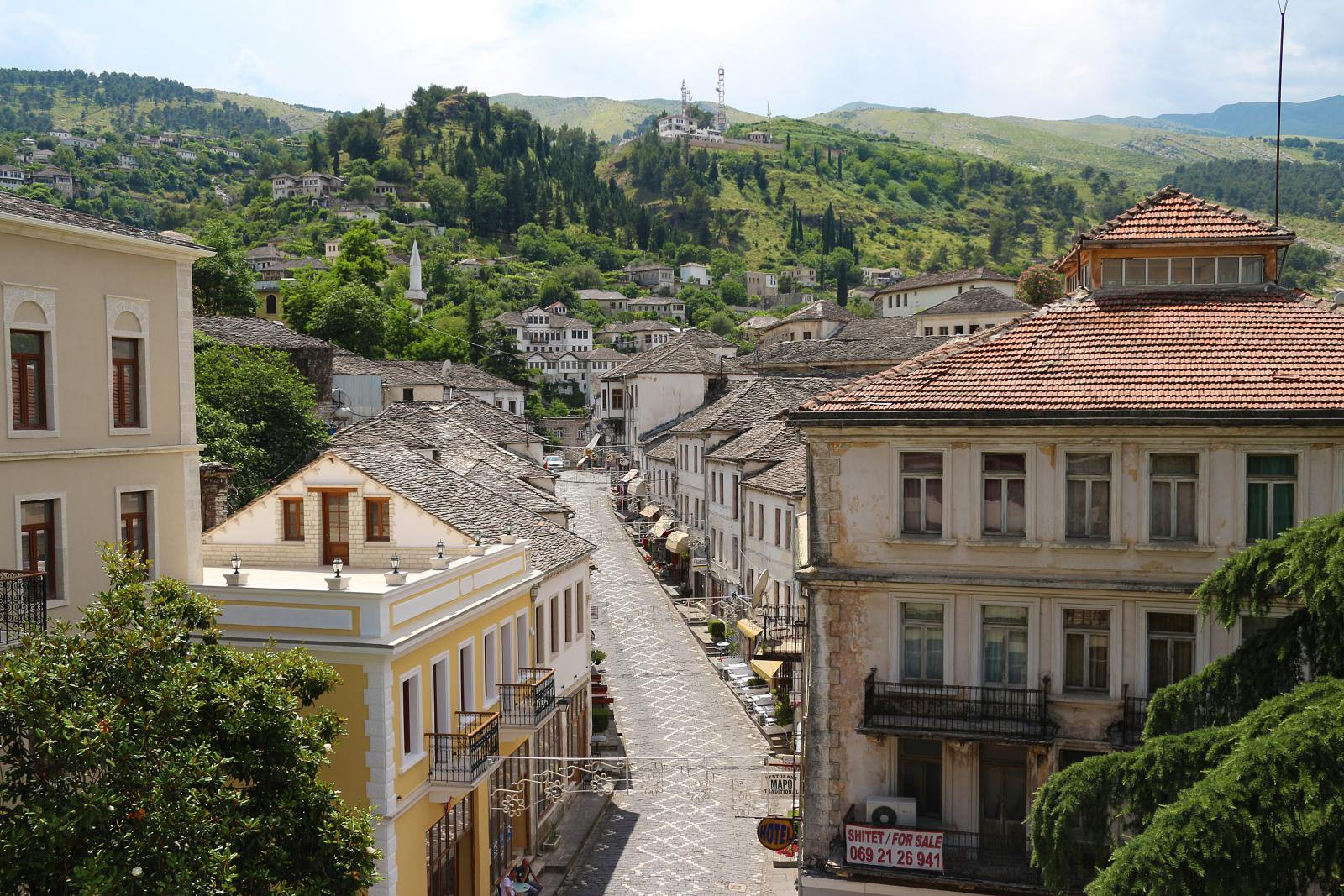
A view of Gjirokaster

- Historical Center of Berat, UNESCO World Heritage Site
- Historical Center of Gjirokaster, UNESCO World Heritage Site
- Old Town of Vlorë
- Old Town of Durrës
- Old Town of Lezhë
- Old Town of Shkodër
- Old Town of Korçë
- Old Town of Krujë
- Old Town of Dhërmi
- Castle of Elbasan

=== Azerbaijan ===
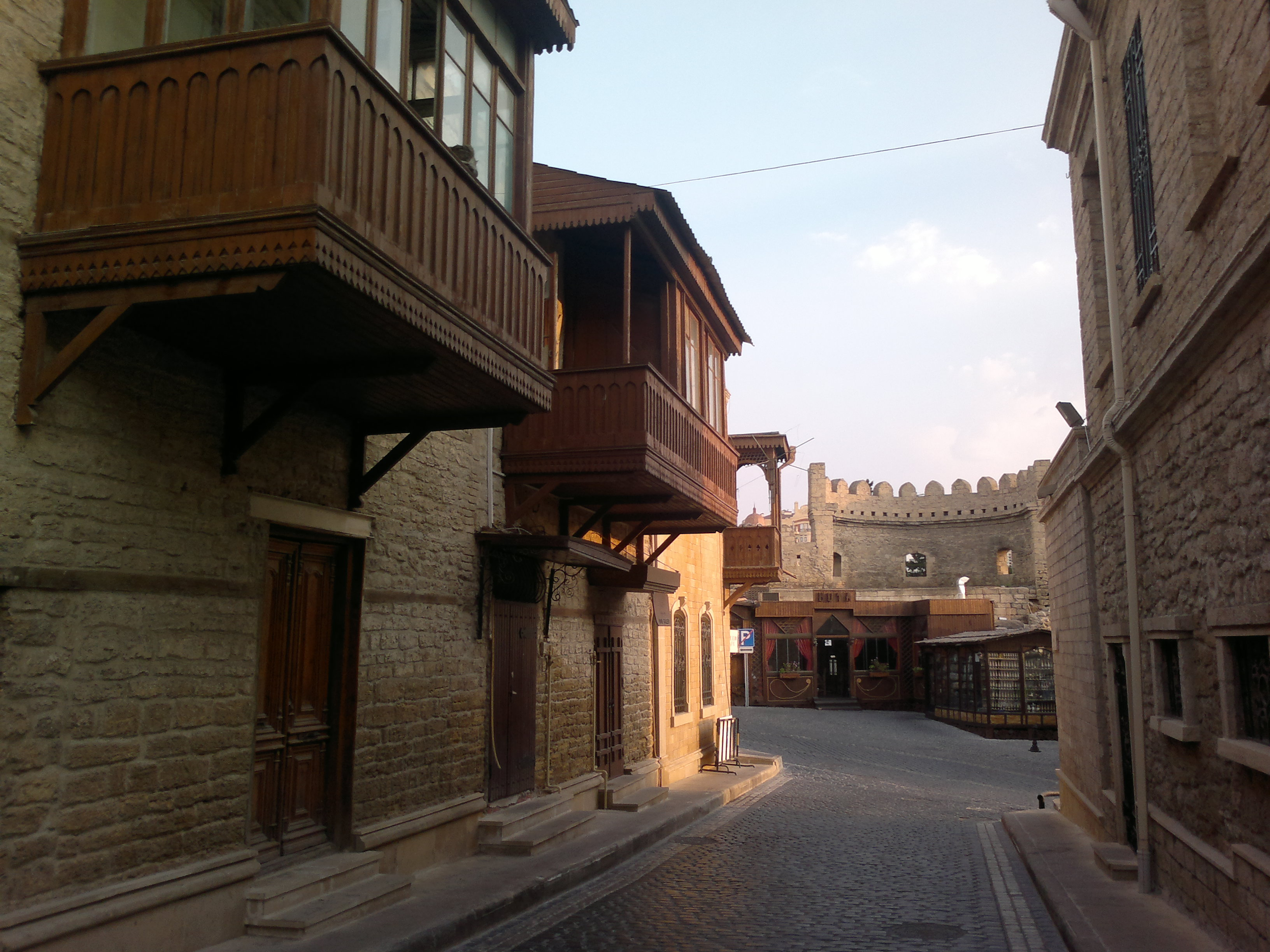
Old houses in the Inner city of Baku

- Walled City of Baku in Baku, UNESCO World Heritage Site
- Historic Center of Shaki, UNESCO World Heritage Site
- Old Town of Ordubad
- Old Town of Ganja

=== Belgium ===
- Antwerp
- Arlon
- Binche
- Bruges, UNESCO World Heritage Site
- Brussels
- Dendermonde
- Dinant
- Durbuy
- Ghent
- Leuven
- Liège
- Lier
- Mechelen
- Mons
- Namur
- Thuin
- Tournai
- Ypres

=== Bosnia and Herzegovina ===
- Historic Center of Sarajevo
- Stari Most (Old City of Mostar)
- City of Višegrad
- Jajce
- Vratnik
- Old Tuzla

=== Bulgaria ===
- Old Town in Plovdiv
- Old Town in Lovech
- Old Town in Nessebur
- Old Town in Sofia
- Old Town in Veliko Tarnovo

=== Croatia ===
- Old Town of Dubrovnik, UNESCO World Heritage Site
- Old Town of Split with Diocletian's Palace, UNESCO World Heritage Site
- Old Town of Trogir, UNESCO World Heritage Site
- Old Town of Varaždin
- Old Town of Rovinj
- Old Zadar
- Gradec and Kaptol, twin old towns of Zagreb
- Old Rijeka
- Old Osijek

=== Czech Republic ===
- Staré Město in Prague, UNESCO World Heritage Site
- Vnitřní město in Český Krumlov, UNESCO World Heritage Site
- Vnitřní město in Kutná Hora, UNESCO World Heritage Site
- Vnitřní město in Telč, UNESCO World Heritage Site
- Vnitřní město in Karlovy Vary
- Vnitřní město in Brno
- Vnitřní město in Plzeň
- Vnitřní město in Liberec

=== Cyprus ===
- Walled city of Nicosia
- Walled city of Famagusta
- Old town of Limassol
- Old town of Paphos also traditionally known as Ktima. Not to be confused with Nea Paphos a World Heritage Site
- Old town of Larnaca

=== Denmark ===
- Den Gamle By in Aarhus
- Nyhavn in Copenhagen
- Old Odense
- Old Aalborg
- Old Haderslev
- Old Rønne

=== Estonia ===
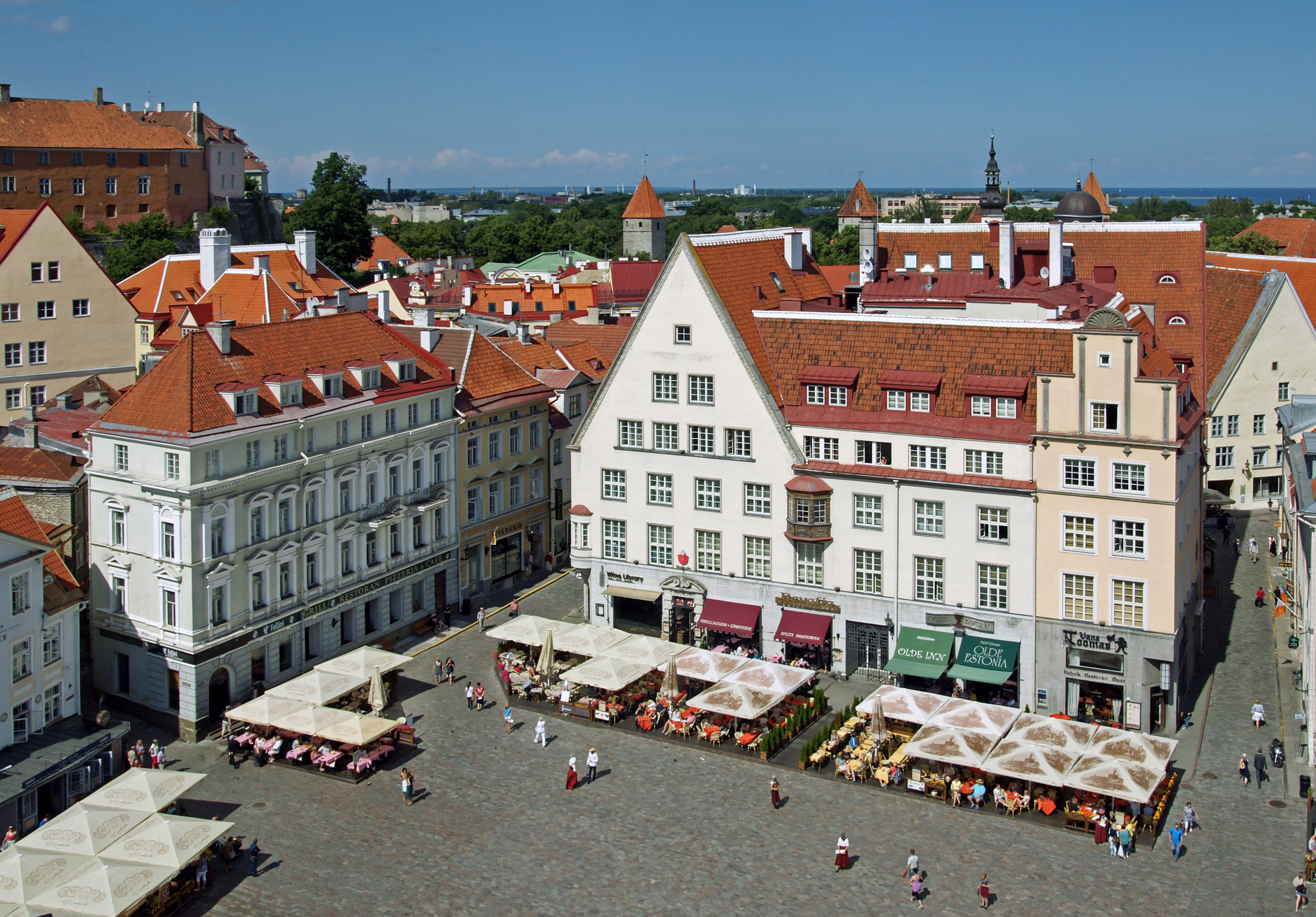
Town Hall square in the Old Town of Tallinn

- Old Town (Vanalinn) of Narva
- Old Town (Vanalinn) of Tallinn, UNESCO World Heritage Site
- Old Town (Vanalinn) of Tartu
- Old Town (Vanalinn) of Pärnu

=== Finland ===
- Old Town (Vanhakaupunki) of Porvoo
- Vanhakaupunki in Turku
- Vanhakaupunki in Helsinki
- Old Rauma, UNESCO World Heritage Site

=== France ===
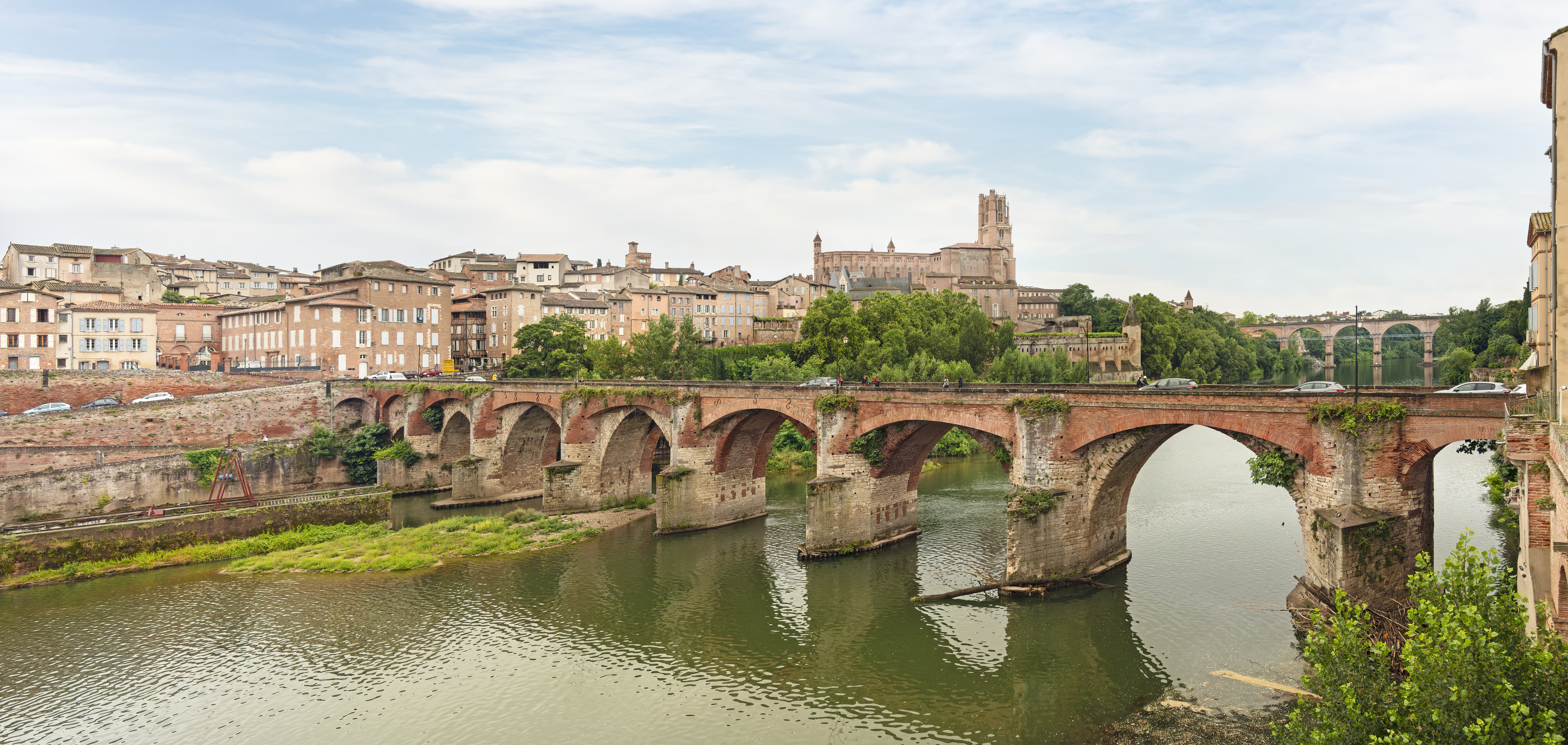
The Old Town of Albi, a UNESCO World Heritage site

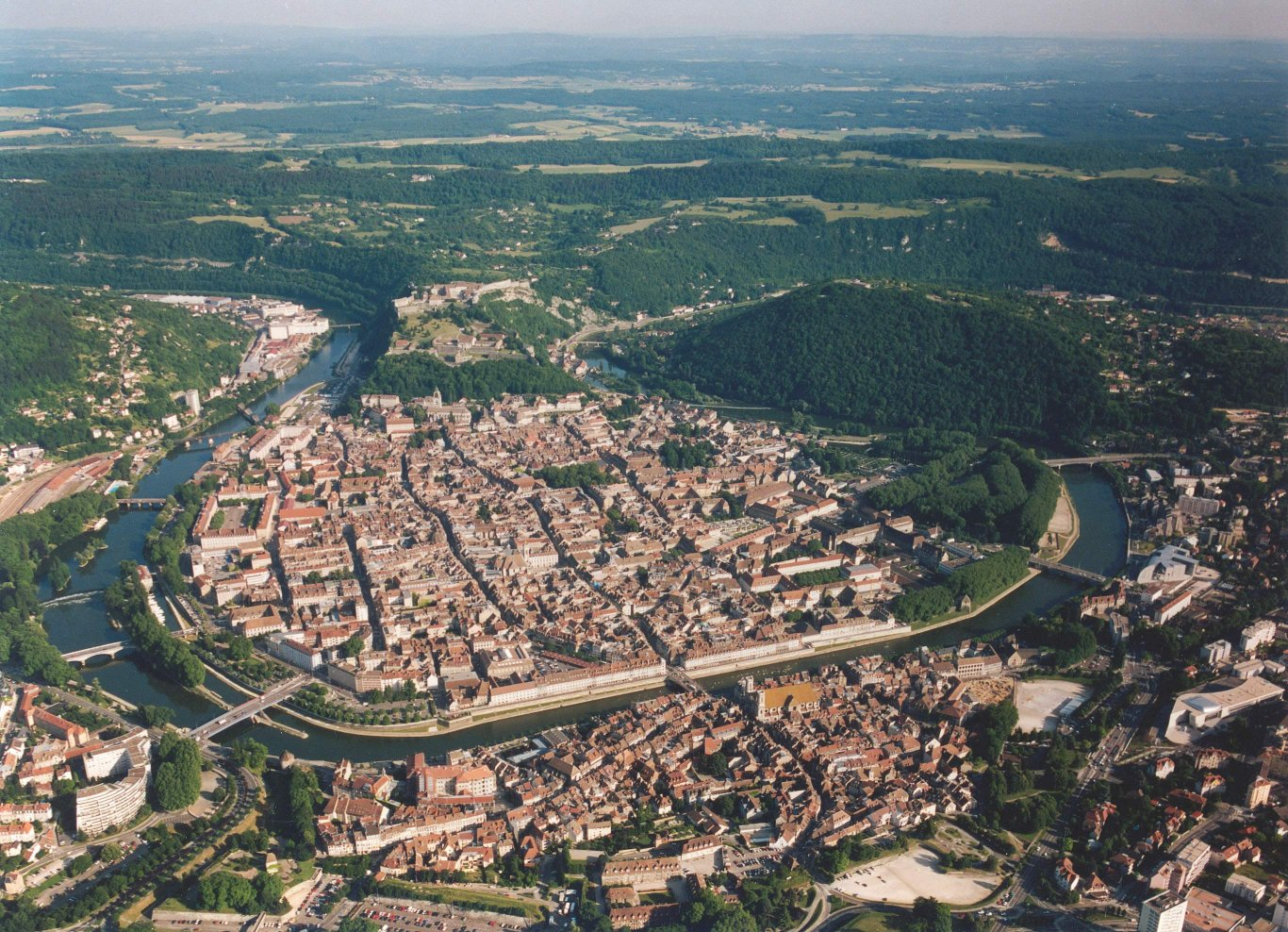
The old city of Besançon and the meander of the Doubs River

The equivalent of "Old Town" in French is vieille ville, although the more formal centre historique ("historical center") is usually written on road signs.

UNESCO World Heritage old towns

- Albi (Tarn)
- Avignon (Vaucluse)
- Bordeaux (Gironde)
- Carcassonne (Aude)
- Lyon (Rhône)
- Provins (Seine-et-Marne)
- Strasbourg (Bas-Rhin)
- Vichy (Allier)

Other notable French old towns include

- Agen (Lot-et-Garonne)
- Agde (Hérault)
- Aigues-Mortes (Gard)
- Aix-en-Provence (Bouches-du-Rhône)
- Alençon (Orne)
- Amboise (Indre-et-Loire)
- Amiens (Somme)
- Angers (Maine-et-Loire)
- Angoulême (Charente)
- Annecy (Haute-Savoie)
- Apt (Vaucluse)
- Arles (Bouches-du-Rhône)
- Arras (Pas-de-Calais)
- Aubenas (Ardèche)
- Auch (Gers)
- Autun (Saône-et-Loire)
- Auxerre (Yonne)
- Bar-le-Duc (Meuse)
- Bayonne (Pyrénées-Atlantiques)
- Beaune (Côte-d'Or)
- Belfort (Territoire de Belfort)
- Bergerac (Dordogne)
- Besançon (Doubs)
- Béthune (Pas-de-Calais)
- Béziers (Hérault)
- Blois (Loir-et-Cher)
- Boulogne-sur-Mer (Pas-de-Calais)
- Bourg-en-Bresse (Ain)
- Bourges ( Cher)
- Caen (Calvados)
- Cahors (Lot)
- Carpentras (Vaucluse)
- Châlon-sur-Saône (Saône-et-Loire)
- Châlons-en-Champagne (Marne)
- Charleville-Mézières (Ardennes)
- Chartres (Eure-et-Loire)
- Chambéry (Savoie)
- Clermont-Ferrand (Puy-de-Dôme)
- Colmar (Haut-Rhin)
- Dieppe (Seine-Maritime)
- Dijon (Côte-d'Or)
- Dinan (Côtes-d'Armor)
- Dole (Jura)
- Épinal (Vosges)
- Fougères (Ille-et-Vilaine)
- Grenoble (Isère)
- Honfleur (Calvados)
- L'Isle-sur-la-Sorgue (Vaucluse)
- Langres (Haute-Marne)
- Laon (Aisne)
- Laval (Mayenne)
- La Rochelle (Charente-Maritime)
- Le Mans (Sarthe)
- Le Puy-en-Velay (Haute-Loire)
- Lille (Nord)
- Limoges (Haute-Vienne)
- Mâcon (Saône-et-Loire)
- Manosque (Alpes-de-Haute-Provence)
- Marseille (Bouches-du-Rhône)
- Meaux (Seine-et-Marne)
- Melun (Seine-et-Marne)
- Mende (Lozère)
- Metz (Moselle)
- Montauban (Tarn-et-Garonne)
- Montbéliard (Doubs)
- Montbrison (Loire)
- Montélimar (Drôme)
- Montpellier (Hérault)
- Morlaix (Finistère)
- Moulins (Allier)
- Mulhouse (Haut-Rhin)
- Nancy (Meurthe-et-Moselle)
- Nantes (Loire-Atlantique)
- Narbonne (Aude)
- Nevers (Nièvre)
- Nice (Alpes-Maritimes)
- Nîmes (Gard)
- Niort (Deux-Sèvres)
- Nyons (Drôme)
- Orange (Vaucluse)
- Orléans (Loiret)
- Paris
- Pau (Pyrénées-Atlantiques)
- Périgueux (Dordogne)
- Perpignan (Pyrénées-Orientales)
- Pézenas (Hérault)
- Poitiers (Vienne)
- Quimper (Finistère)
- Reims (Marne)
- Rennes (Ille-et-Vilaine)
- Roanne (Loire)
- Rodez (Aveyron)
- Rouen (Seine-Maritime)
- Saint-Étienne (Loire)
- Saint-Germain-en-Laye (Yvelines)
- Saint-Malo (Ille-et-Vilaine)
- Saint-Omer (Pas-de-Calais)
- Saint-Quentin (Aisne)
- Saint-Rémy-de-Provence (Bouches-du-Rhône)
- Saintes (Charente-Maritime)
- Salon-de-Provence (Bouches-du-Rhône)
- Sens (Yonne)
- Sète (Hérault)
- Sisteron (Alpes-de-Haute-Provence)
- Toul (Meurthe-et-Moselle)
- Toulon (Var)
- Toulouse (Haute-Garonne)
- Tours (Indre-et-Loire)
- Troyes (Aube)
- Tulle (Corrèze)
- Valence (Drôme)
- Vannes (Morbihan)
- Verdun (Meuse)
- Versailles (Yvelines)
- Vesoul (Haute-Saône)
- Villefranche-sur-Saône (Rhône)
- Vitré (Ille-et-Vilaine)

=== Georgia ===
- Old Tbilisi (Dzveli Tbilisi) in Tbilisi
- Historical Center in Mtskheta, UNESCO World Heritage Site
- Old Town in Kutaisi (Imereti)
- Old Town in Batumi (Adjara)
- Old Town in Sighnaghi (Kakheti)
- Old Town in Telavi (Kakheti)
- Old Town in Gori (Shida Kartli)

=== Germany ===
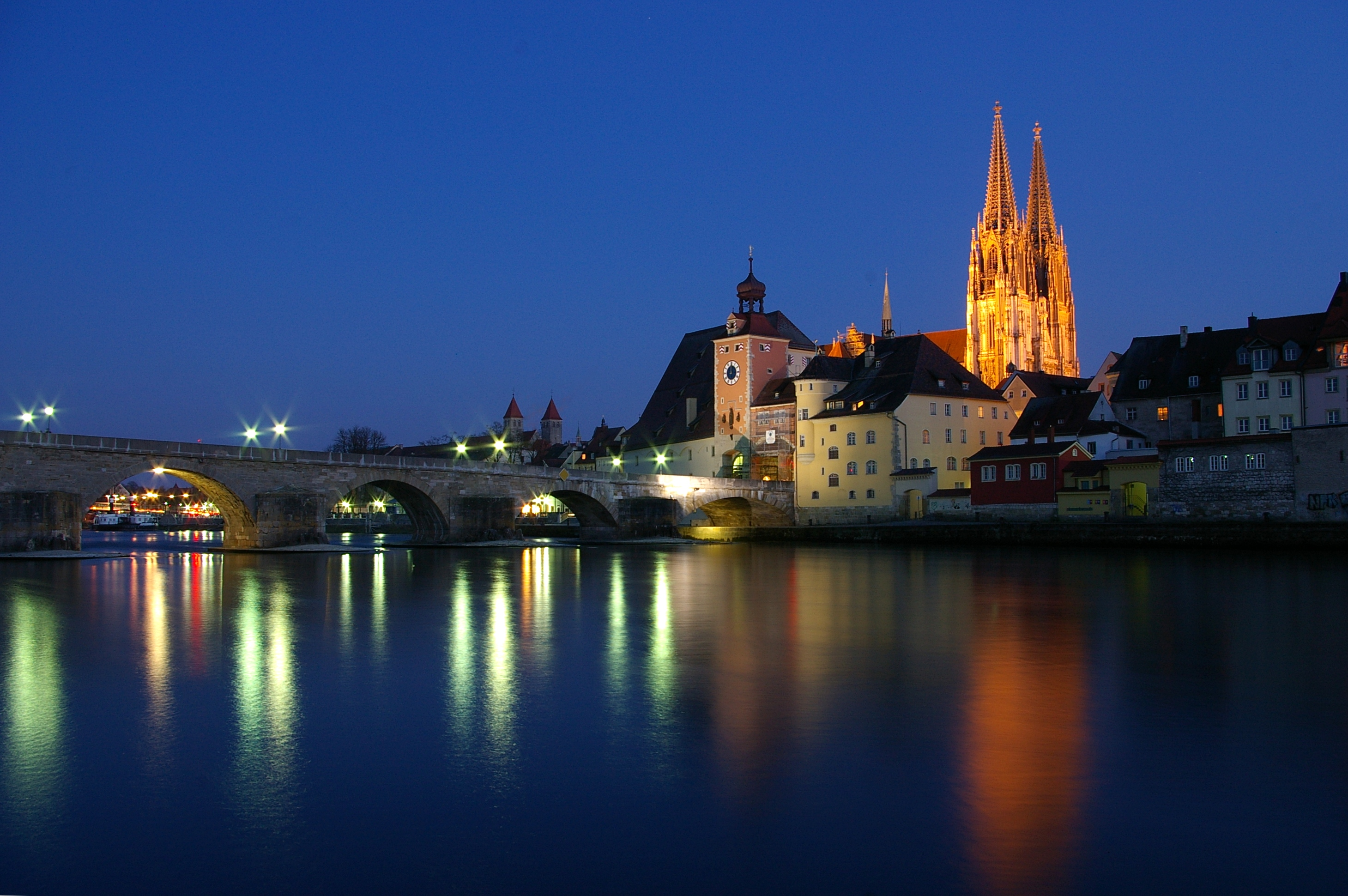
Old town (Altstadt) of Regensburg in Bavaria, a World Heritage site

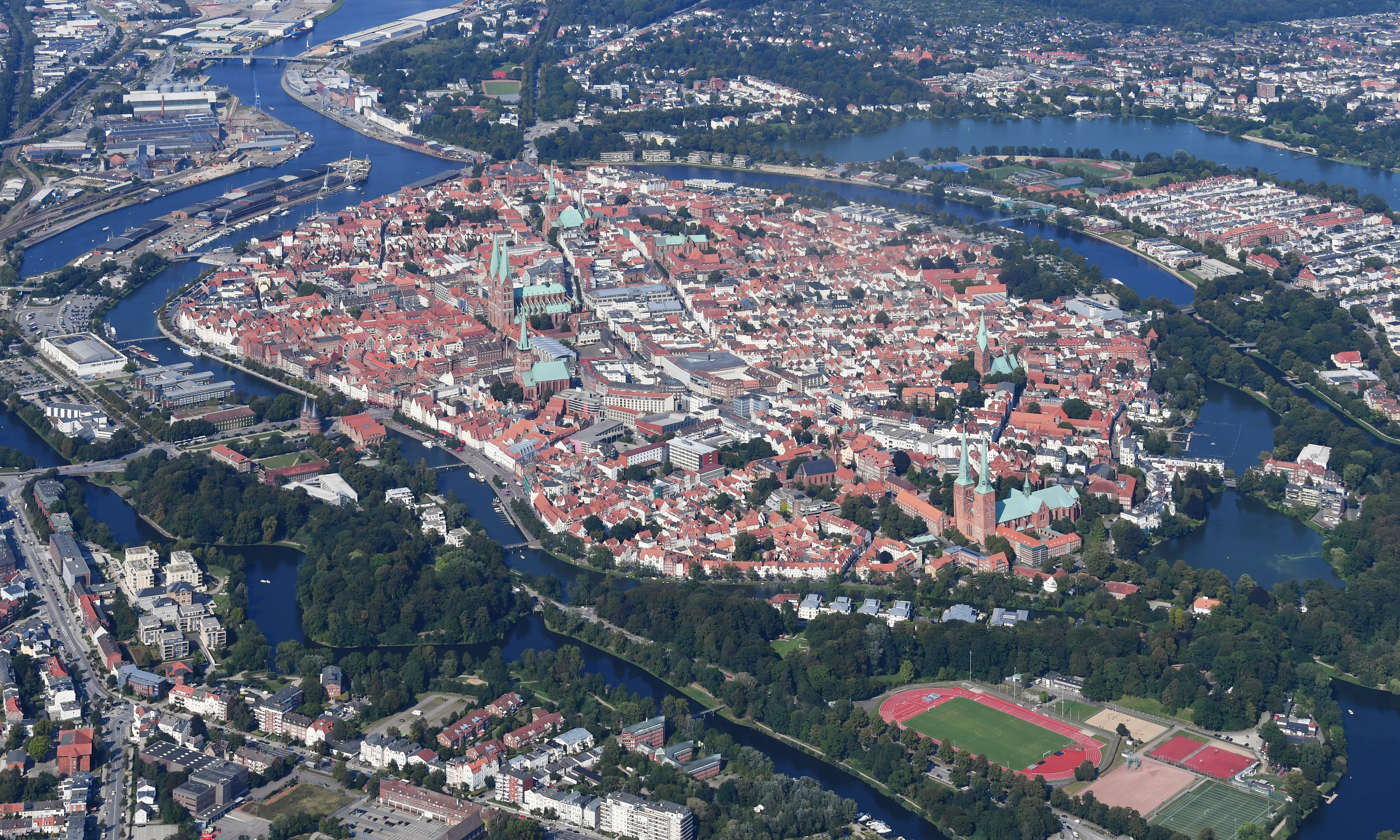
Hanseatic old town of Lübeck, aerial view

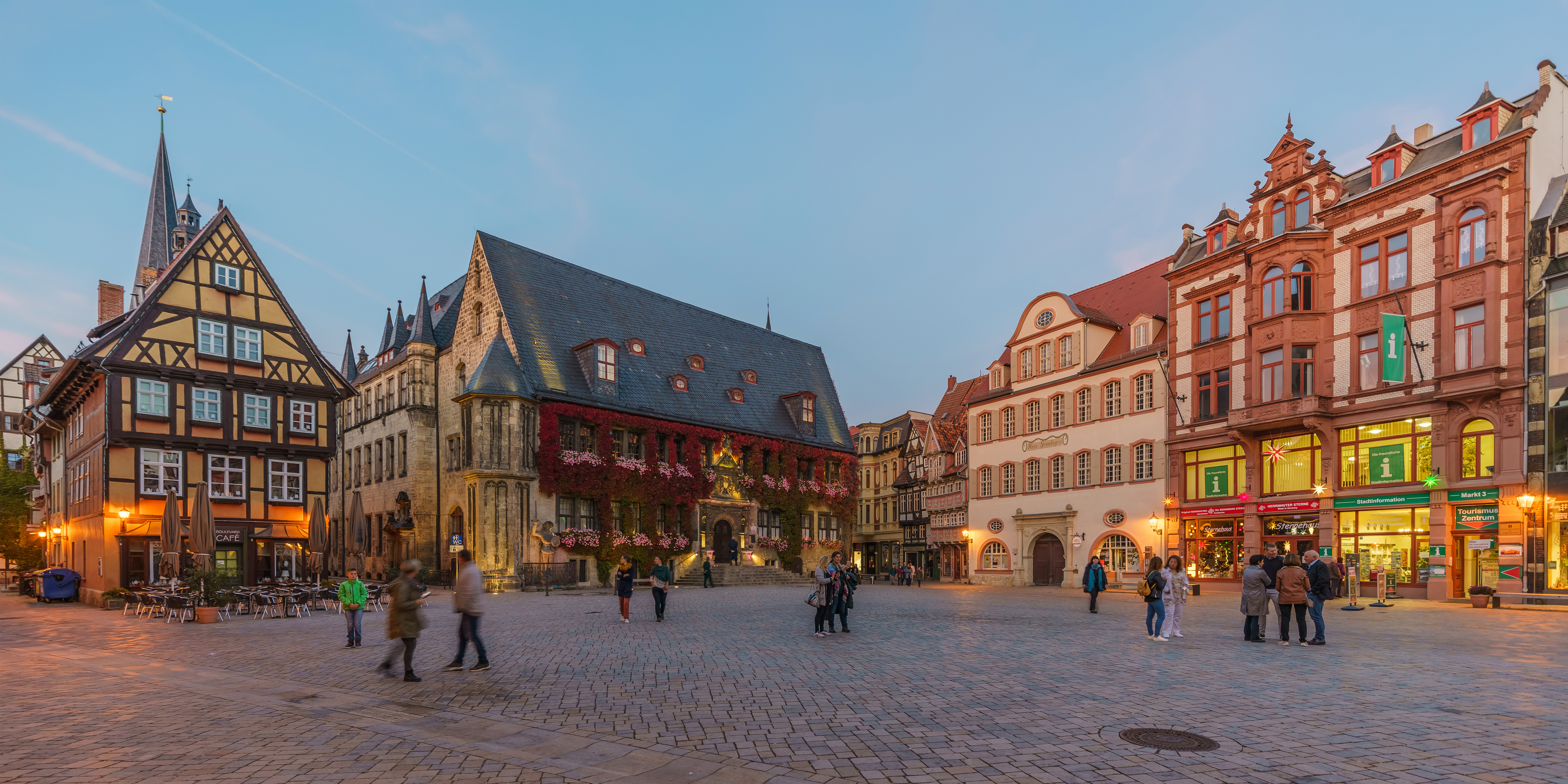
Old town of Quedlinburg

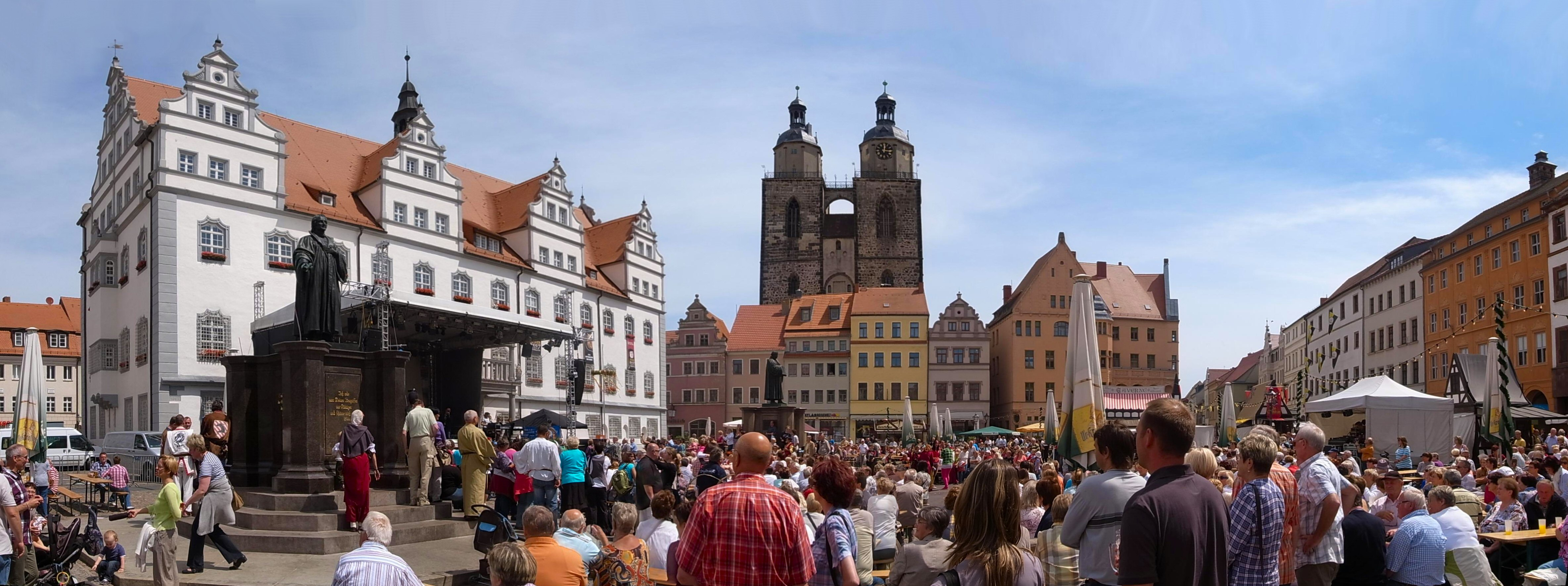
Wittenberg during Luthers Hochzeit festival

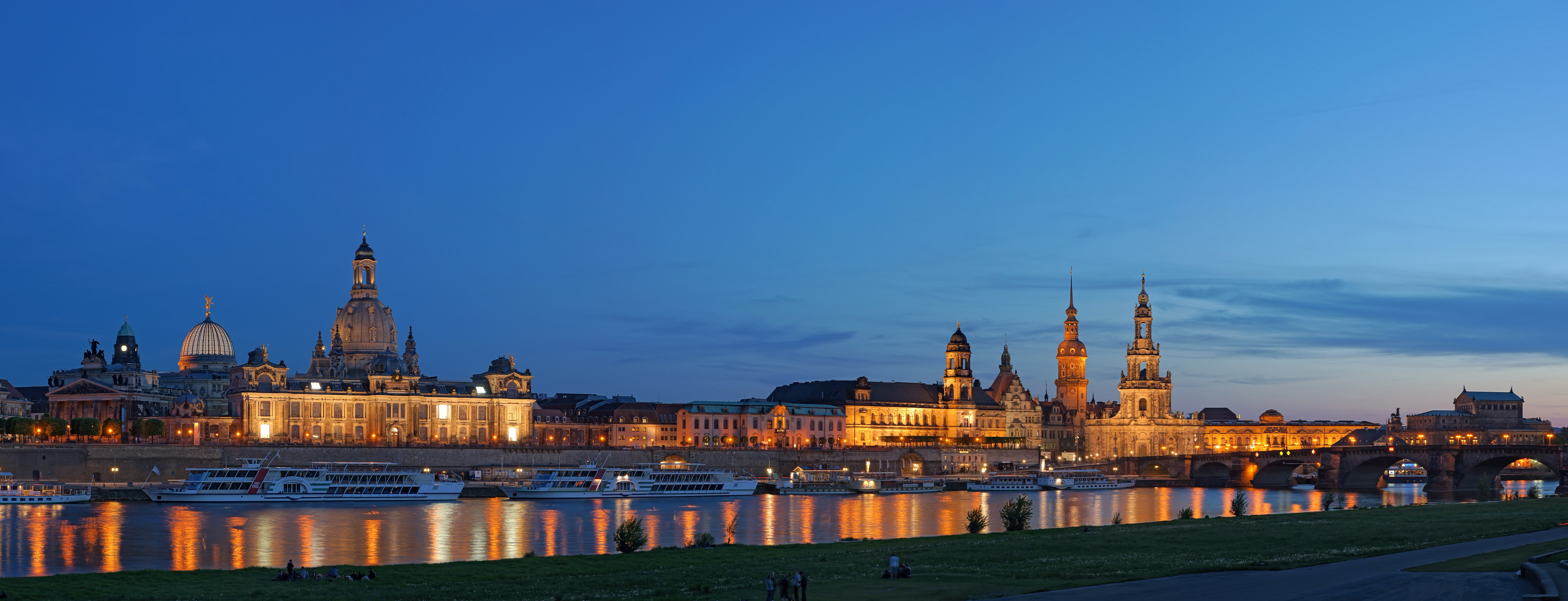
Dresden

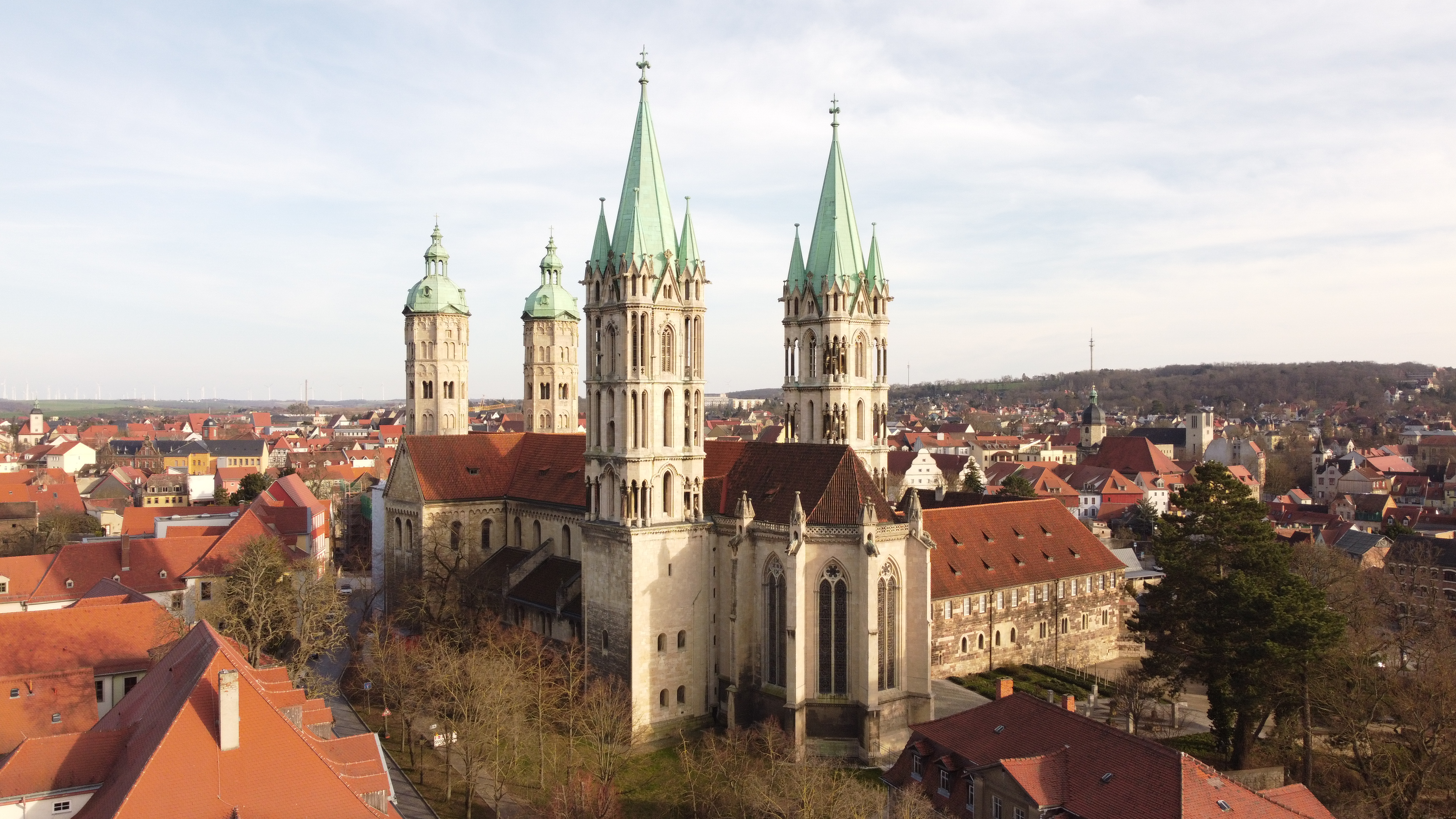
Naumburg

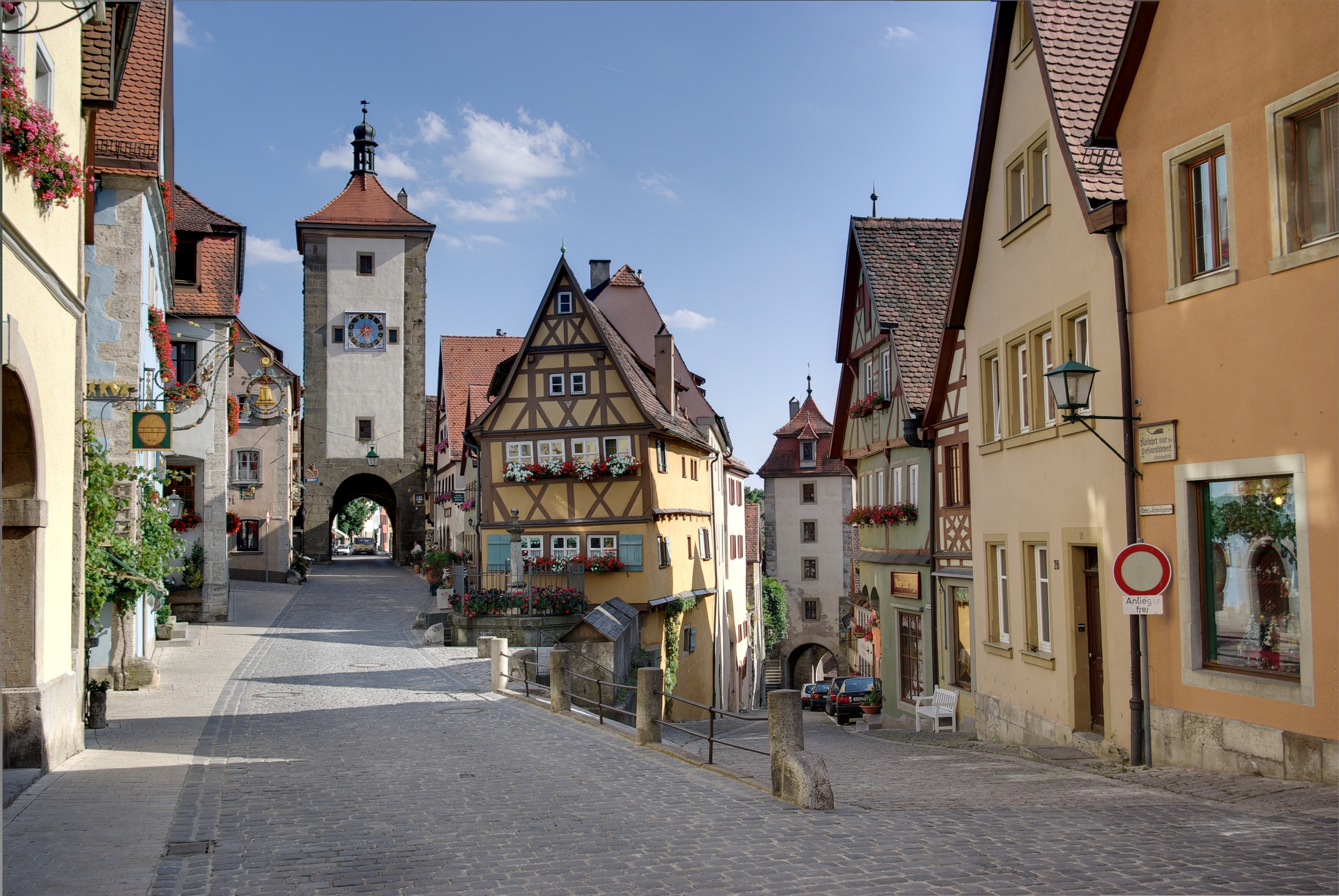
Rothenburg ob der Tauber

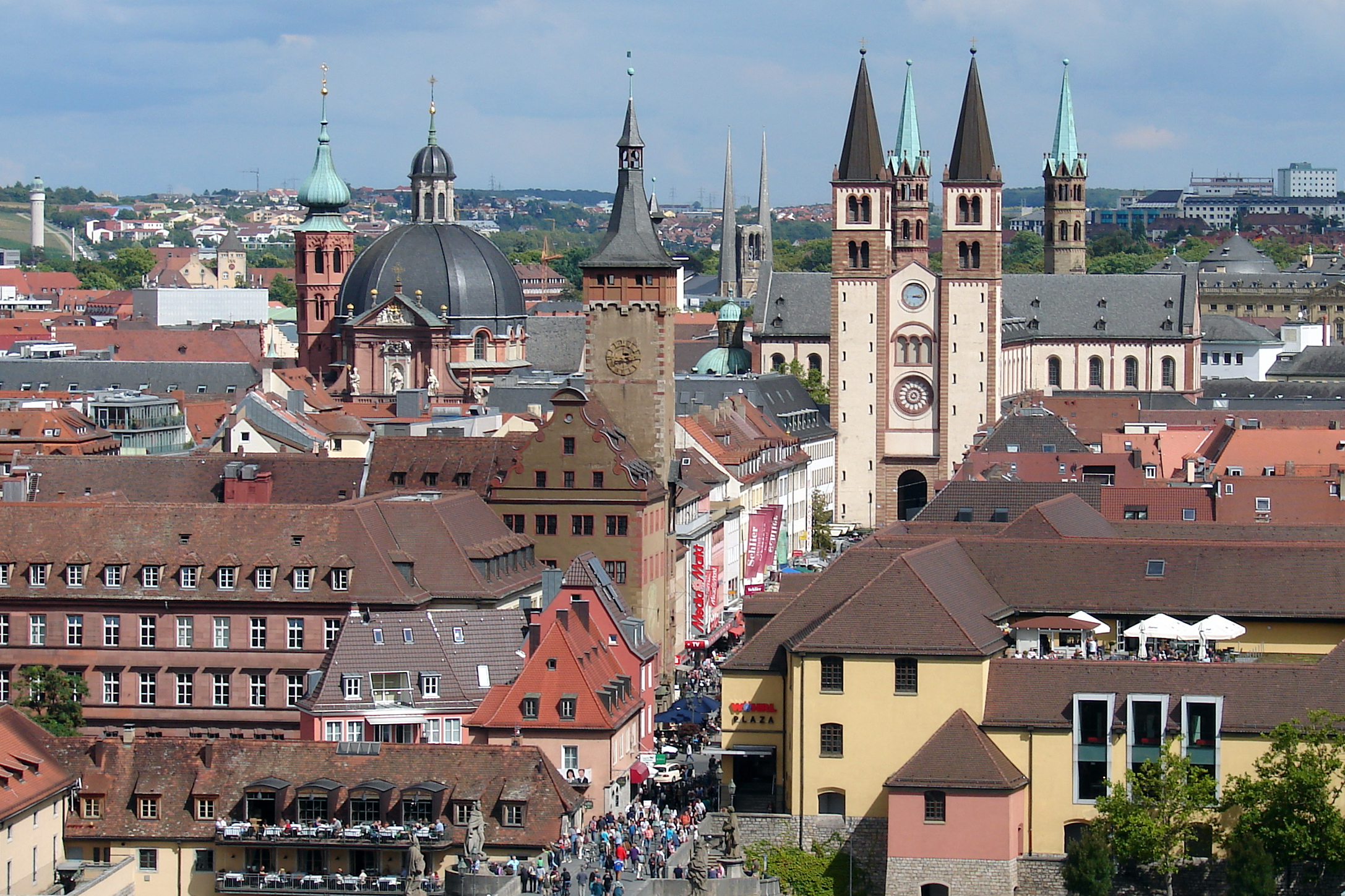
Old town of Würzburg

- UNESCO World Heritage old towns in Germany:
  - Bamberg (Franconia)
  - Goslar (Lower Saxony)
  - Lübeck (Schleswig-Holstein)
  - Quedlinburg (Saxony-Anhalt)
  - Regensburg (Bavaria)
  - Stralsund (Western Pomerania)
  - Wismar (Mecklenburg)

Other notable/famous old towns include:

Northern Germany

- Bad Doberan (Mecklenburg)
- Binz (Western Pomerania)
- Celle (Lower Saxony)
- Eckernförde (Schleswig)
- Flensburg (Schleswig)
- Friedrichstadt (Schleswig)
- Güstrow (Mecklenburg)
- Hamelin (Lower Saxony)
- Hann. Münden (Lower Saxony)
- Heringsdorf (Western Pomerania)
- Lüneburg (Lower Saxony)
- Neustrelitz (Mecklenburg)
- Putbus (Western Pomerania)
- Ratzeburg (Holstein)
- Schwerin (Mecklenburg)
- Stade (Lower Saxony)
- Waren (Mecklenburg)
- Wolfenbüttel (Lower Saxony)

Eastern Germany

- Bautzen (Lusatia)
- Dresden (Saxony)
- Erfurt (Thuringia)
- Görlitz (Silesia)
- Meissen (Saxony)
- Naumburg (Saxony-Anhalt)
- Pirna (Saxony)
- Stolberg (Saxony-Anhalt)
- Weimar (Thuringia)
- Wernigerode (Saxony-Anhalt)
- Wittenberg (Saxony-Anhalt)

Southern Germany

- Baden-Baden (Baden)
- Dinkelsbühl (Bavaria)
- Freiburg (Baden)
- Füssen (Bavaria)
- Heidelberg (Baden)
- Konstanz (Swabia)
- Landshut (Bavaria)
- Lindau (Bavaria)
- Nuremberg (Franconia)
- Ravensburg (Swabia)
- Rothenburg (Bavaria)
- Schwäbisch Hall (Swabia)
- Tübingen (Swabia)
- Würzburg (Franconia)

Western Germany

- Bacharach (Rhineland-Palatinate)
- Beilstein (Rhineland)
- Bernkastel-Kues (Rhineland)
- Cochem (Rhineland-Palatinate)
- Hattingen (North Rhine-Westphalia)
- Landau (Palatinate)
- Lemgo (Westphalia)
- Limburg (Hesse)
- Linz am Rhein (Rheinland)
- Marburg (Hesse)
- Monschau (Rhineland)
- Montabaur (Rhineland-Palatinate)
- Rüdesheim (Hesse)
- Soest (North Rhine-Westphalia)
- Trier (Rhineland-Palatinate)
- Wetzlar(Hesse)
- Xanten (Rhineland)

=== Greece ===
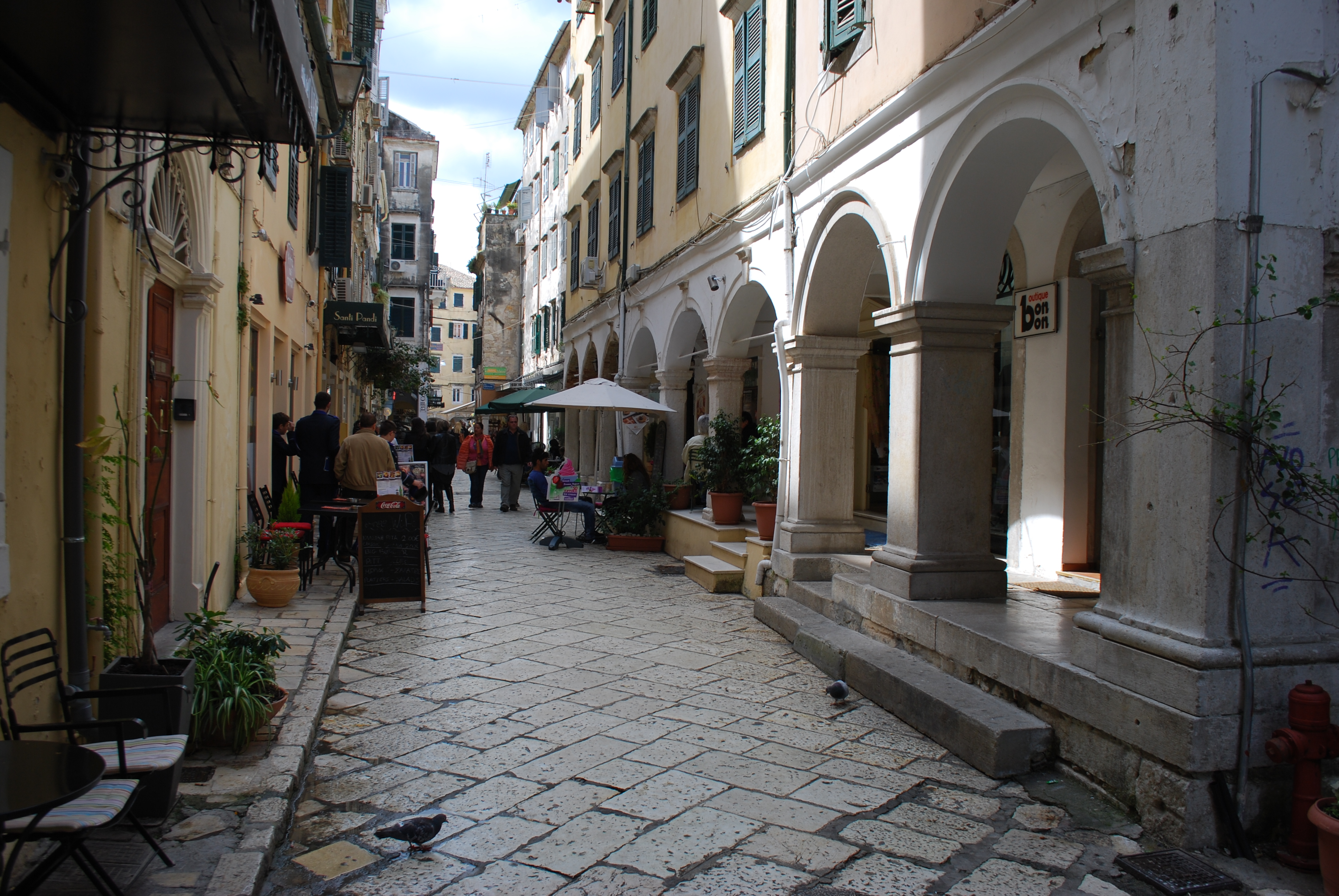
A street in the Old Town of Corfu

- Medieval City of Rhodes, UNESCO World Heritage Site, South Aegean
- Historical center of Corfu (city), UNESCO World Heritage Site, Ionian Islands
- Historical center of Chora, UNESCO World Heritage Site, South Aegean
- Kastellorizo, South Aegean
- Plaka, Athens

==== Crete ====
- Old Town of Chania
- Old Town of Heraklion
- Old Town of Agios Nikolaos
- Old Town of Rethymno

==== Attica ====
- Plaka, Athens

==== Macedonia ====
- Ano Poli and Ladadika, Thessaloniki
- Old Town of Drama
- Old Town of Kavala
- Old Town of Florina
- Old Town of Nymfaio

==== Thessaly ====
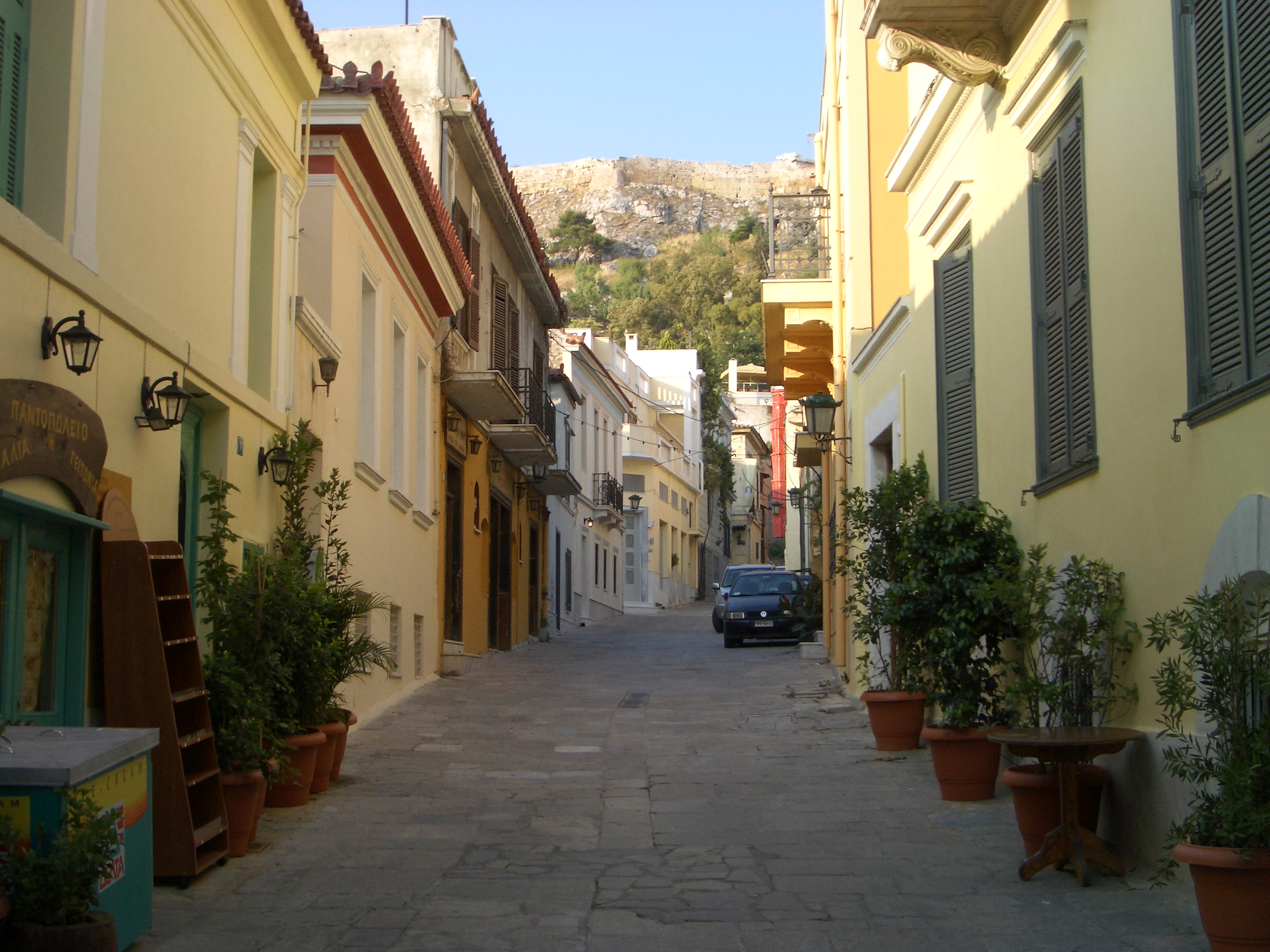
A street in Plaka, Athens

- Varousi, Trikala
- Old Town of Volos

==== Thrace ====
- Old Town of Xanthi
- Old Town of Komotini

==== Epirus ====
- Old Town of Parga
- Old Town of Metsovo
- Ioannina Castle, Ioannina
- Old Town of Preveza
- Old Town of Konitsa

==== Peloponnese ====
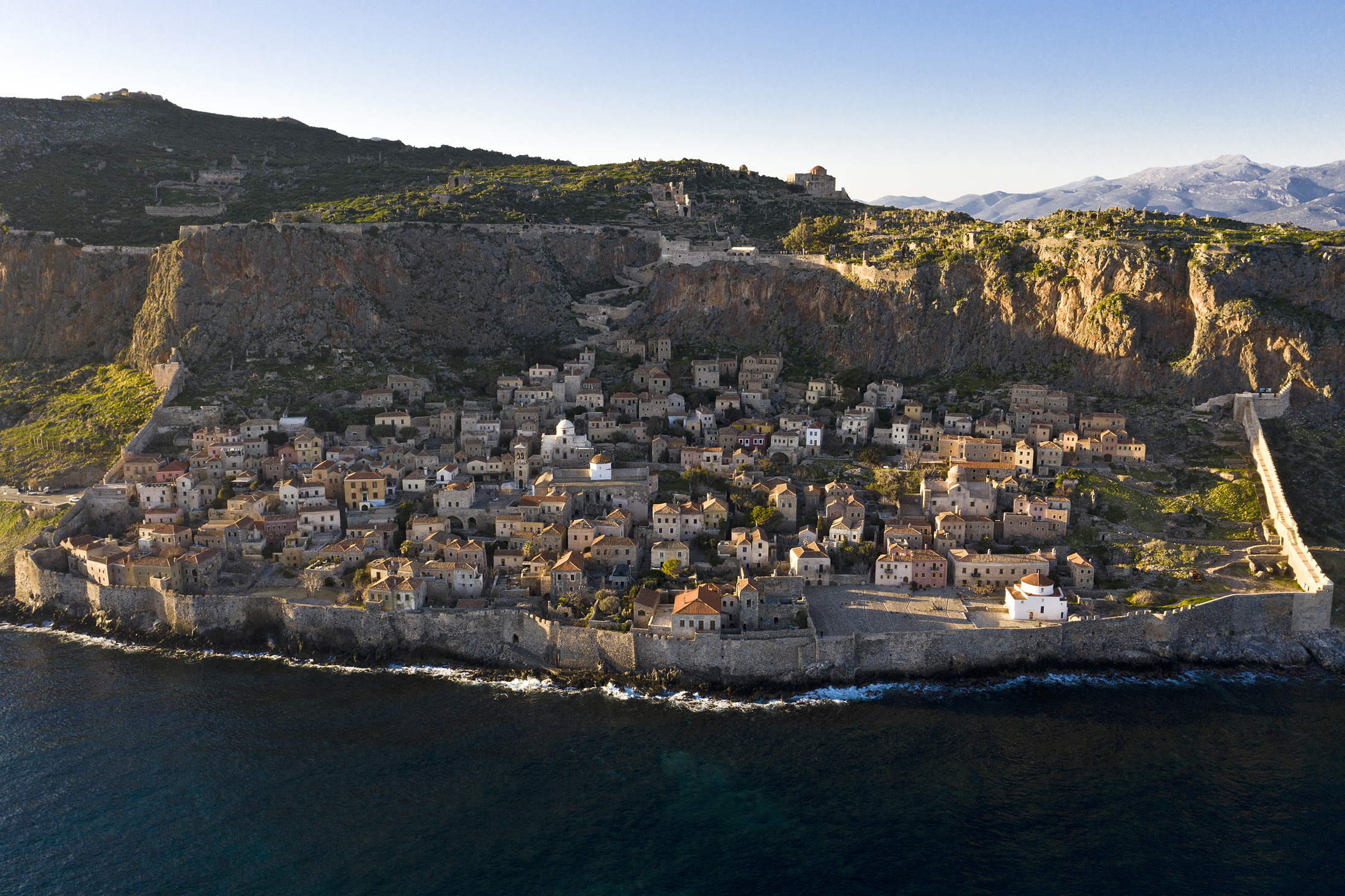
A view of Monemvasia from above

- Old Town of Koroni
- Old Town of Dimitsana
- Old Town of Kalavryta
- Old Stemnitsa
- Old Town of Areopoli
- Old Town of Patras
- Old Town of Leonidio
- Old Town of Kalamata
- Monemvasia
- Old Town of Nafplio

==== Ionian Islands ====
- Old Town of Fiskardo

==== Aegan Islands ====
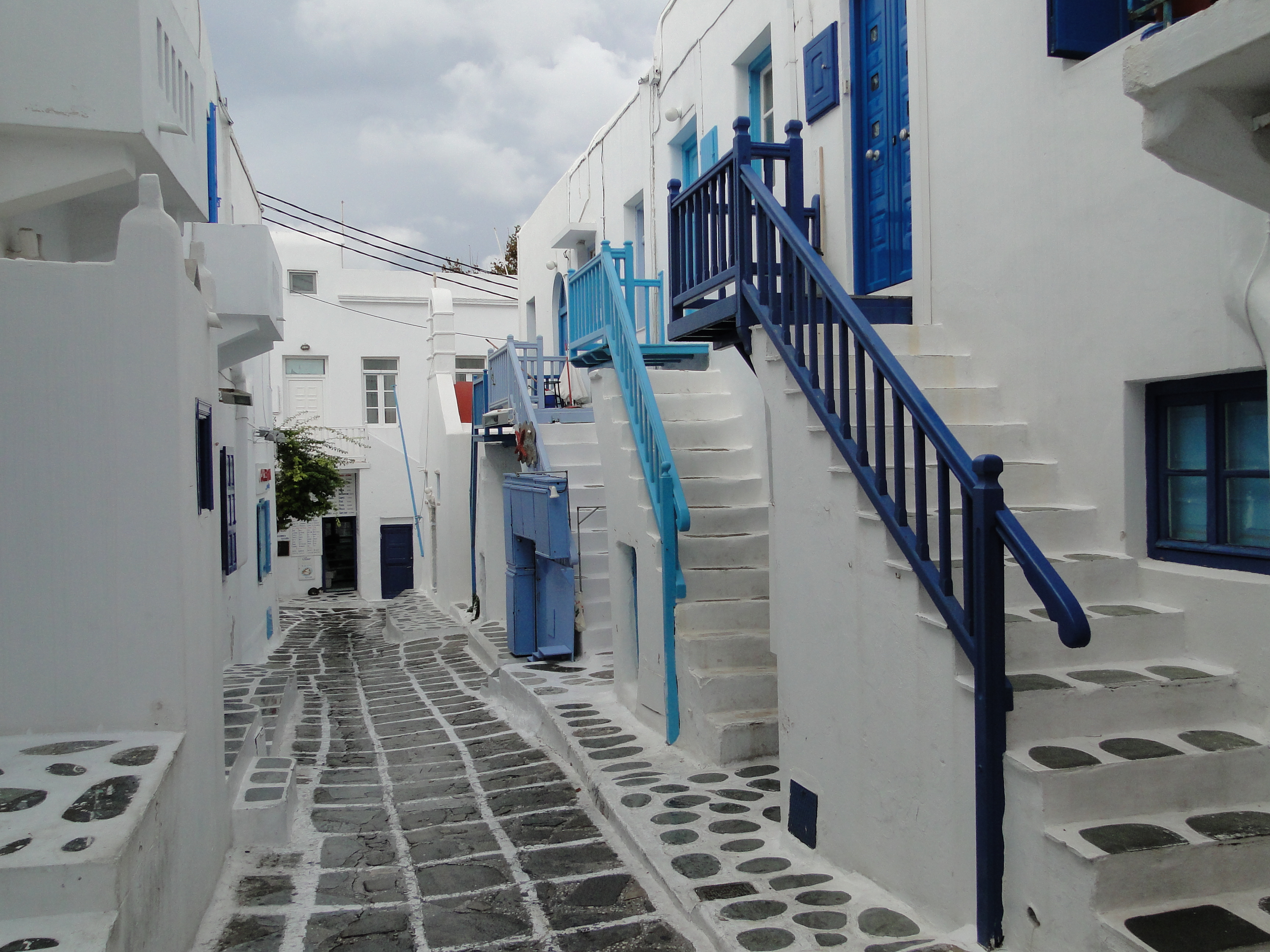
Street in Mykonos

- Old Town of Mithymna
- Old Town of Symi
- Old Town of Andros
- Old Town of Mykonos
- Old Town of Ermoupoli

==== Central Greece ====
- Old Town of Galaxidi, Central Greece
- Old Arachova
- Old Town of Nafpaktos
- Old Town of Livadeia

=== Hungary ===
- Historical downtown of Budapest, UNESCO World Heritage Site no. 400
- Old Town of Pécs, UNESCO World Heritage Site no. 853
- Mountain abbey settlement of Pannonhalma, UNESCO World Heritage Site no. 758
- Old village of Hollókő, UNESCO World Heritage Site no. 401
- Old wine town of Tokaj, UNESCO World Heritage Site no. 1063
- Old town centre and fortress of Eger
- Old town centre of Székesfehérvár
- Old town centre of Szeged
- Old town centre of Debrecen
- Walled town centre of Sopron

=== Italy ===
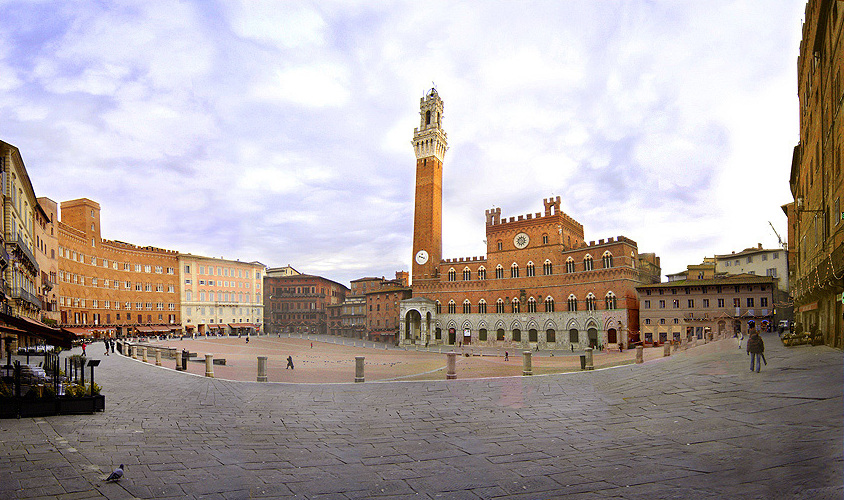
Old town of Siena

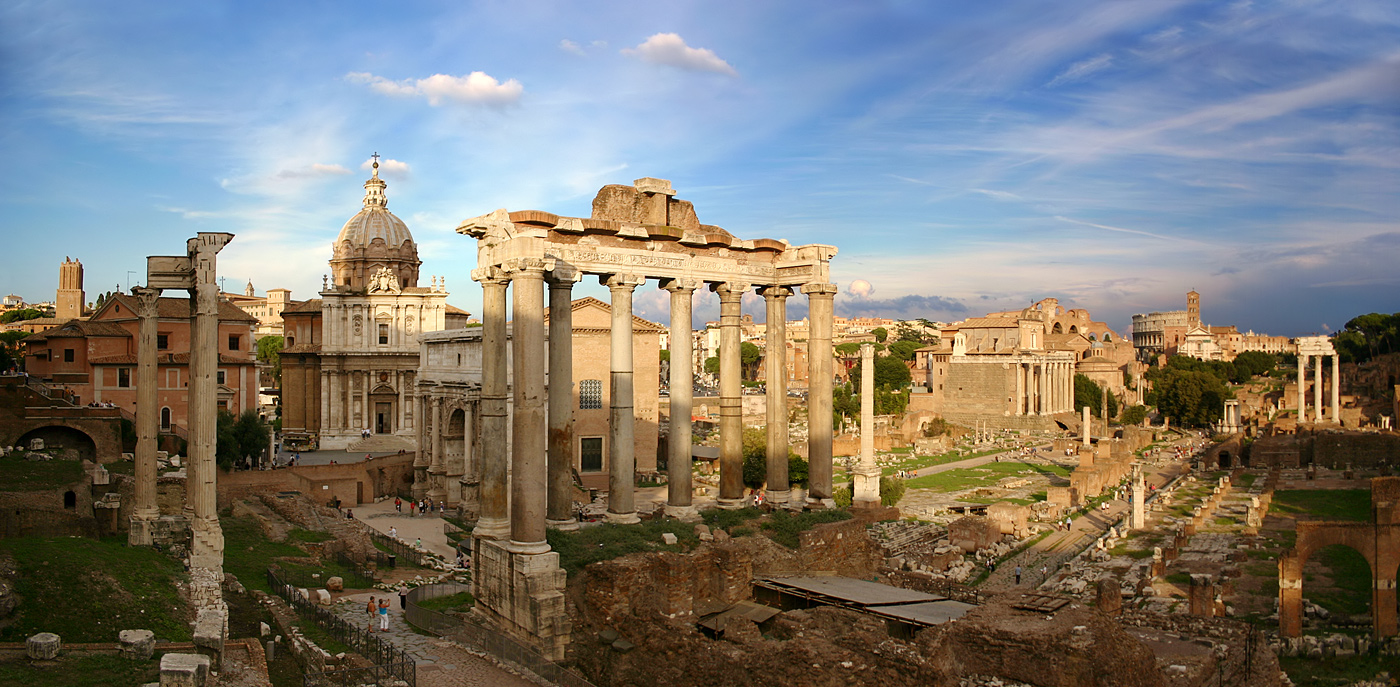
Historic Centre of Rome

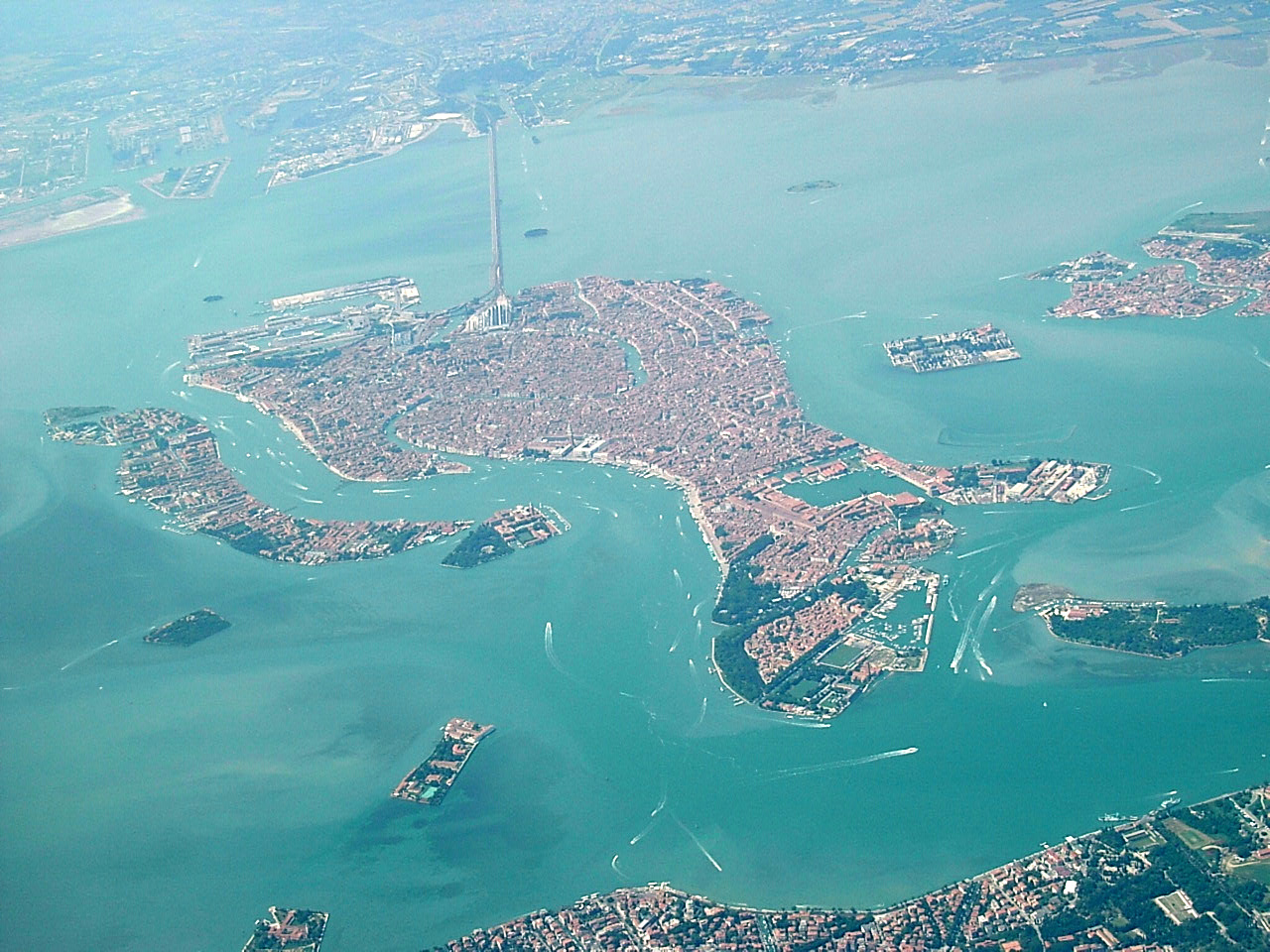
Venice as seen from the air

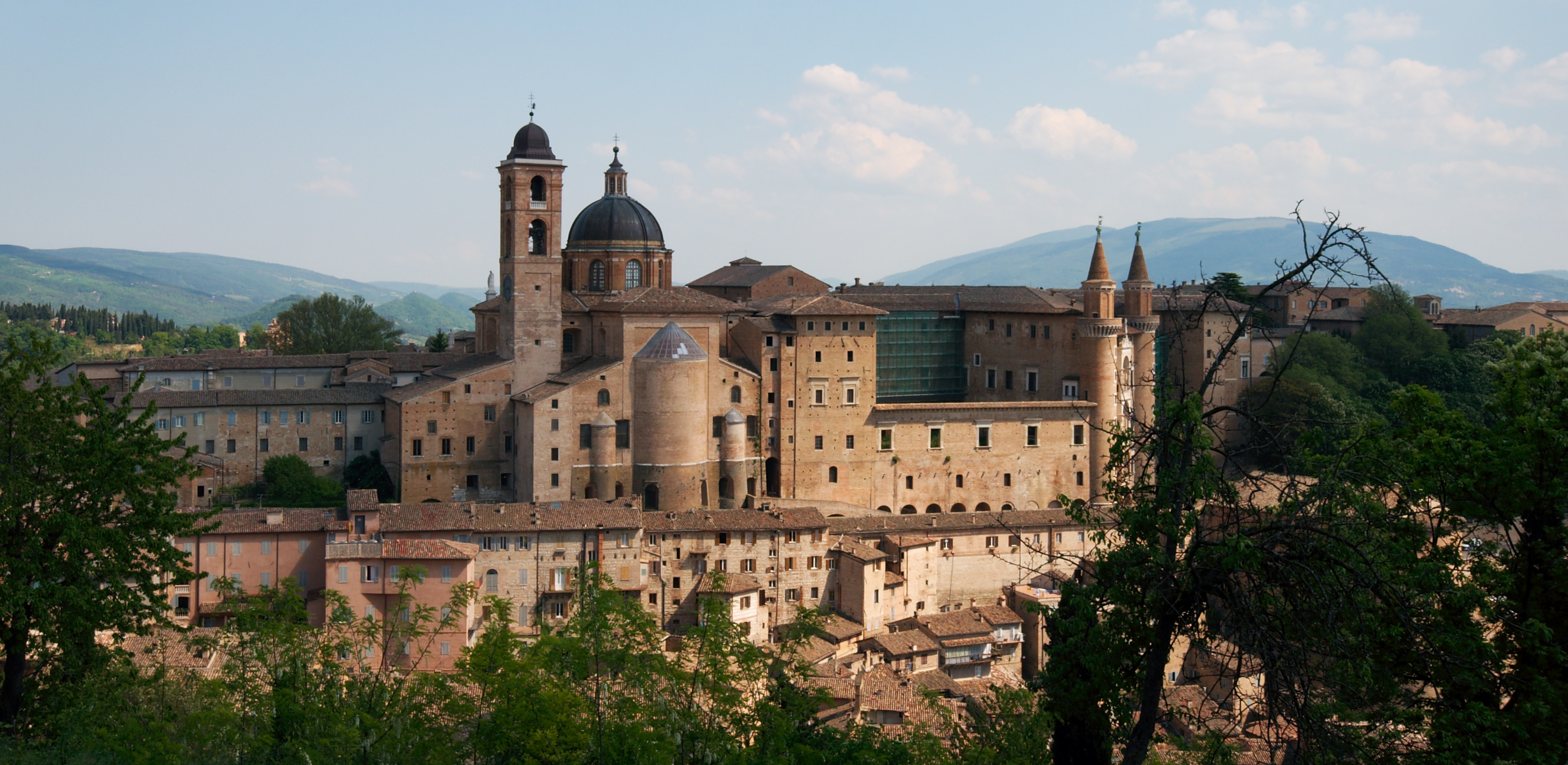
Old town of Urbino

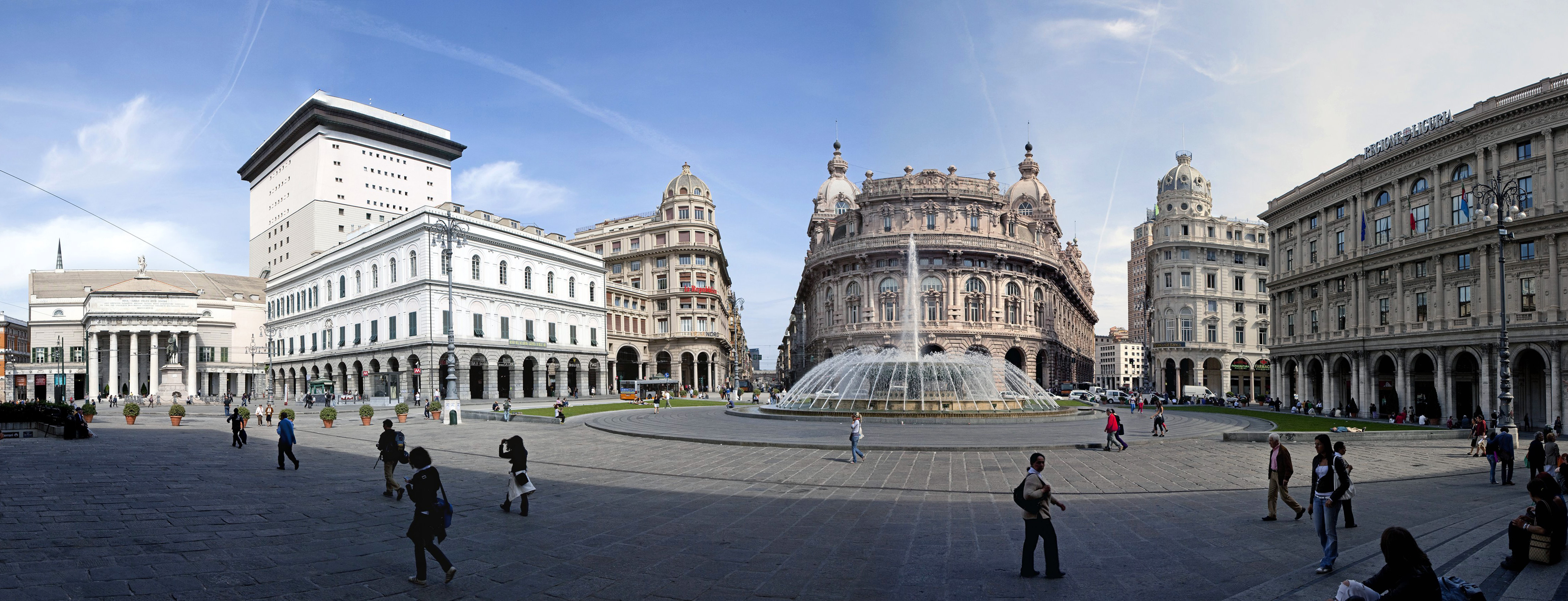
Genoa

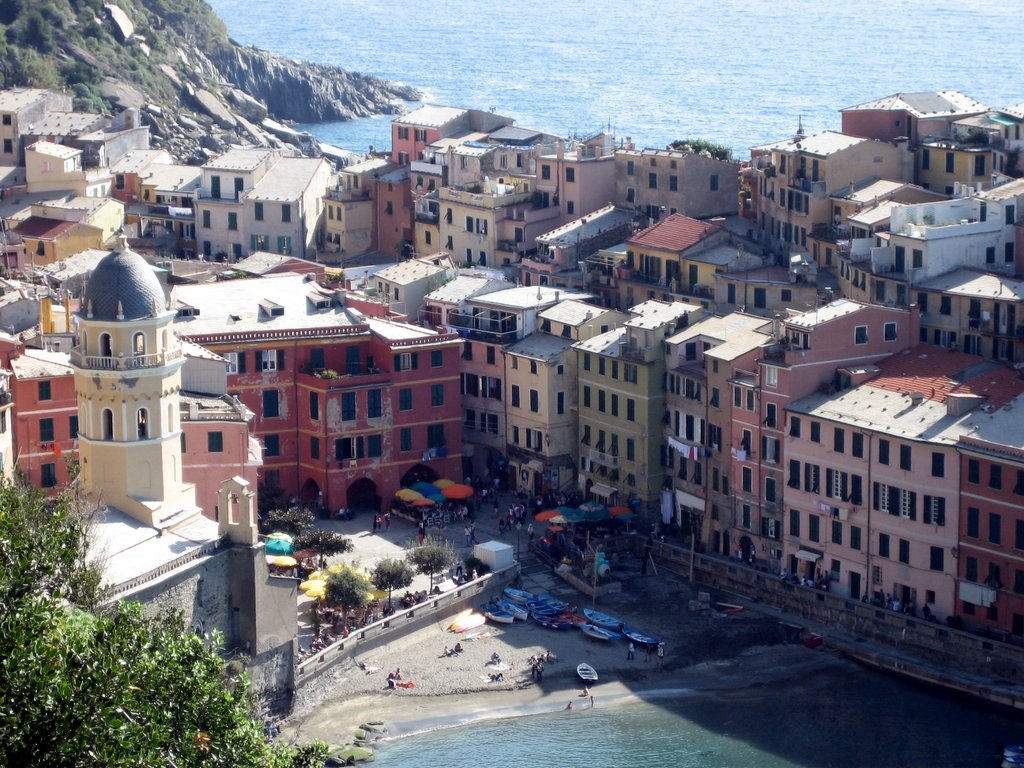
Vernazza, one of the towns of Cinque Terre in Liguria, Italy

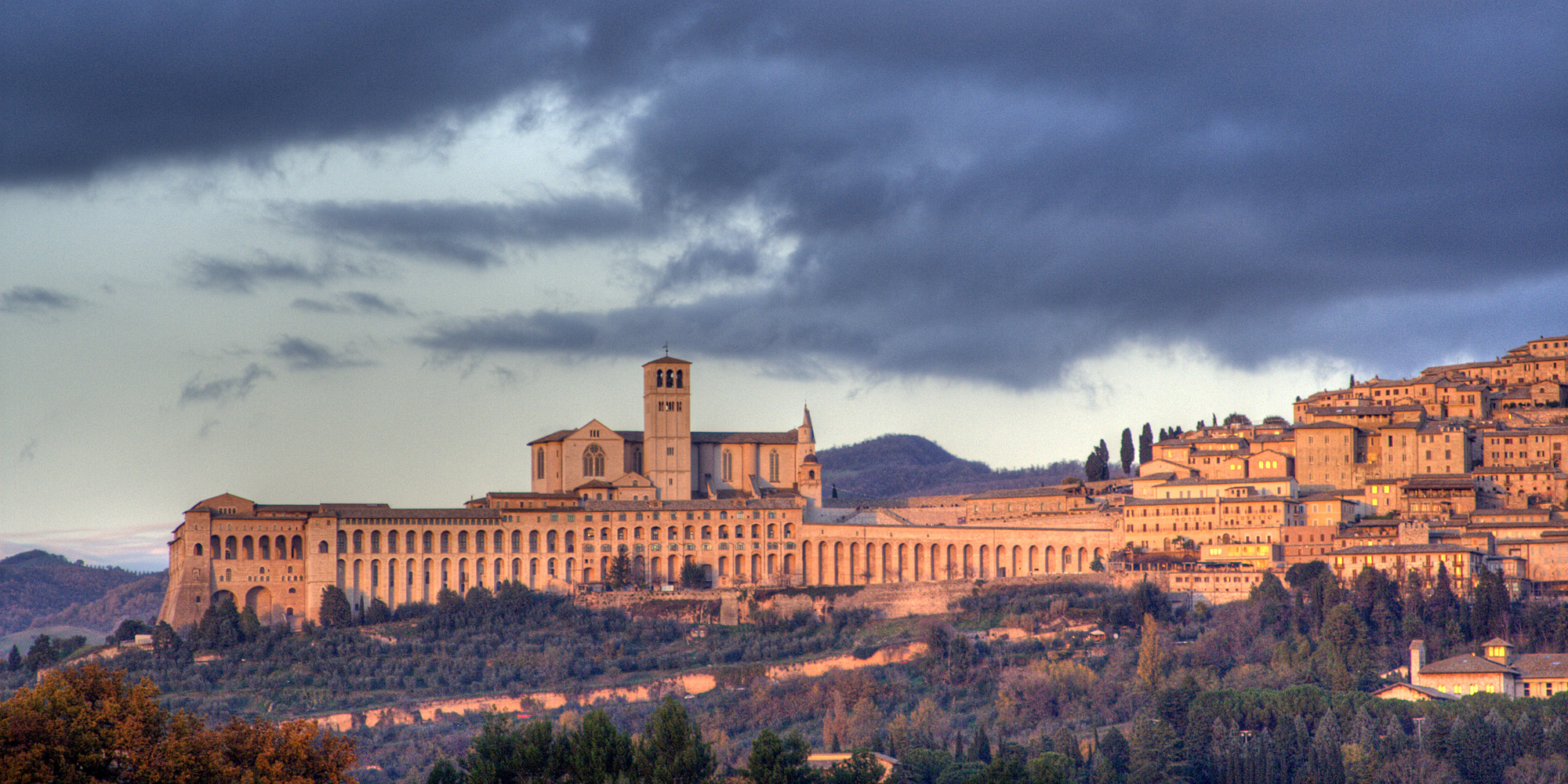
Skyline of Assisi

UNESCO World Heritage old towns in Italy

- Assisi (Umbria)
- Ferrara (Emilia-Romagna)
- Florence (Tuscany)
- Genoa (Liguria)
- Mantua (Lombardy)
- Modena (Emilia-Romagna)
- Naples (Campania)
- Padua (Veneto)
- Pienza (Tuscany)
- Pisa (Tuscany)
- Ravenna (Emilia-Romagna)
- Rome (Lazio)
- San Gimignano (Tuscany)
- Siena (Tuscany)
- Siracusa (Sicily)
- Urbino (Marche)
- Venice (Veneto)
- Verona (Veneto)
- Vicenza (Veneto)

I Borghi più belli d'Italia is an association of small Italian towns of historical interest.

Other notable old towns include:

Northern Italy

- Bassano del Grappa (Veneto)
- Bergamo (Lombardy)
- Bologna (Emilia-Romagna)
- Bolzano (Trentino-Alto Adige)
- Castelfranco Veneto (Veneto)
- Chioggia (Veneto)
- Cittadella (Veneto)
- Milan (Lombardy)
- Palmanova (Friuli-Venezia Giulia)
- Parma (Emilia-Romagna)
- Pavia (Lombardy)
- Polcenigo (Friuli-Venezia Giulia)
- Sacile (Friuli-Venezia Giulia)
- Trento (Trentino-Alto Adige)
- Treviso (Veneto)
- Trieste (Friuli-Venezia Giulia)
- Turin (Piedmont)
- Udine (Friuli-Venezia Giulia)
- Vittorio Veneto (Veneto)

Central Italy

- Ancona (Marche)
- Arezzo (Tuscany)
- Camerino (Marche)
- Colle di Val d'Elsa (Tuscany)
- Gubbio (Umbria)
- Loreto (Marche)
- Lucca (Tuscany)
- Massa Marittima (Tuscany)
- Montalcino (Tuscany)
- Montefiascone (Lazio)
- Monteleone di Spoleto (Umbria)
- Montepulciano (Tuscany)
- Orvieto (Umbria)
- Perugia (Umbria)
- Tivoli (Lazio)
- Viterbo (Lazio)
- Volterra (Tuscany)

Southern Italy

- Bari (Apulia)
- Benevento (Campania)
- Catania (Sicily)
- Cefalù (Sicily)
- Erice (Sicily)
- Gallipoli (Apulia)
- Lecce (Apulia)
- Maratea (Basilicata)
- Martina Franca (Apulia)
- Monopoli (Apulia)
- Ostuni (Apulia)
- Palermo (Sicily)
- Salerno (Campania)
- Trani (Apulia)
- Tropea (Calabria)

=== Latvia ===
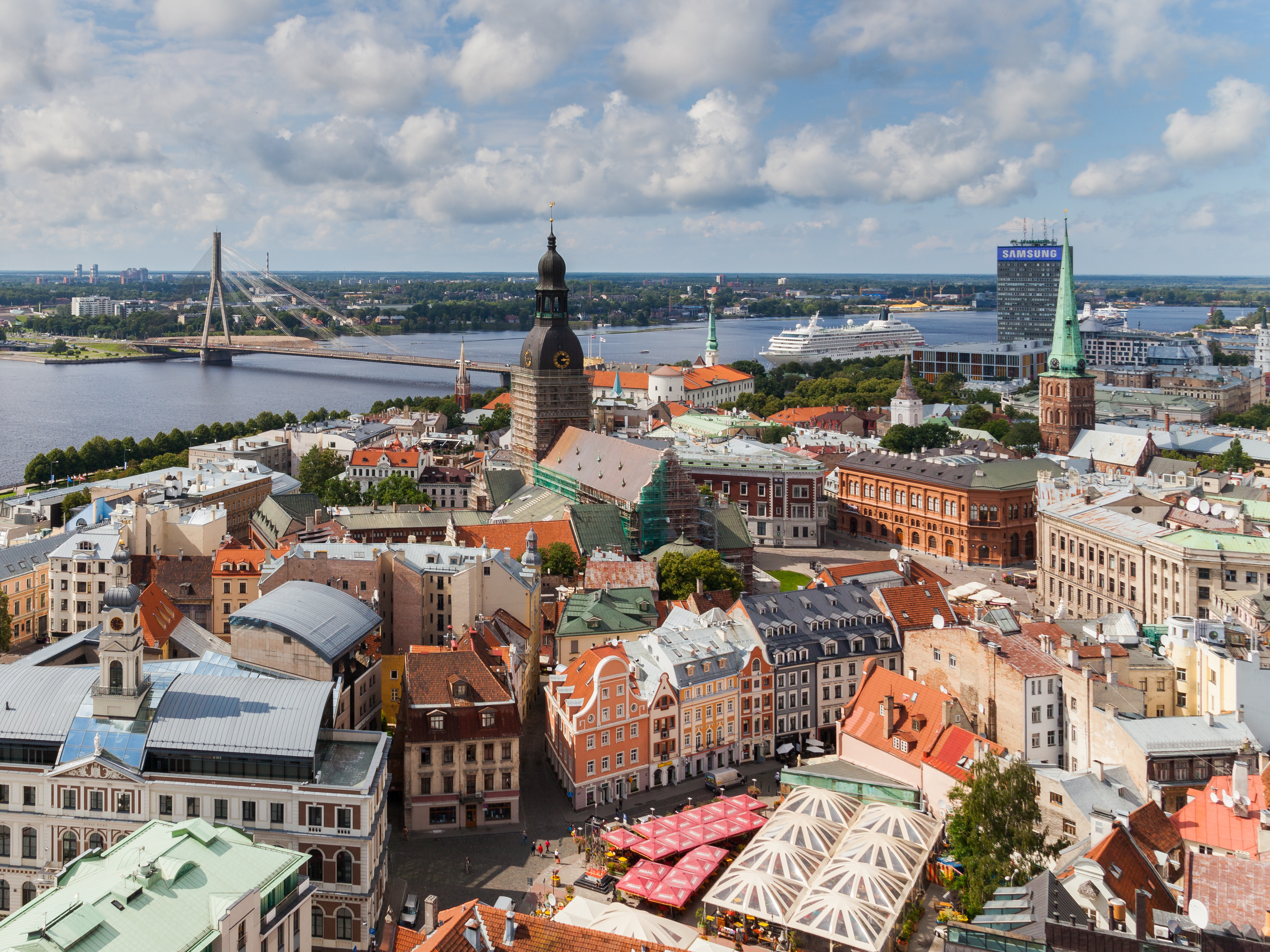
Vecrīga

- Vecrīga in Riga, UNESCO World Heritage Site
- Old Town of Liepāja
- Old Daugavpils
- Old Kuldīga, UNESCO World Heritage Site
- Old Town of Cēsis
- Old Ventspils

=== Lithuania ===
- Senamiestis in Vilnius (a part of UNESCO)
- Senamiestis in Kaunas
- Senamiestis in Klaipėda
- Senamiestis in Trakai
- Senamiestis in Kėdainiai
- Senamiestis in Ukmergė

=== Luxembourg ===
- Old Town of Luxembourg City, UNESCO World Heritage Site

=== Montenegro ===
- Old Town of Kotor, a World Heritage Site
- Old Town of Budva
- Old Town of Herceg Novi
- Old Town of Perast
- Old Town of Ulcinj
- Historical core of Cetinje
- Stara Varoš (Podgorica)
- Stari Bar

=== Moldova ===
- Old Town of Chișinău

=== Netherlands ===
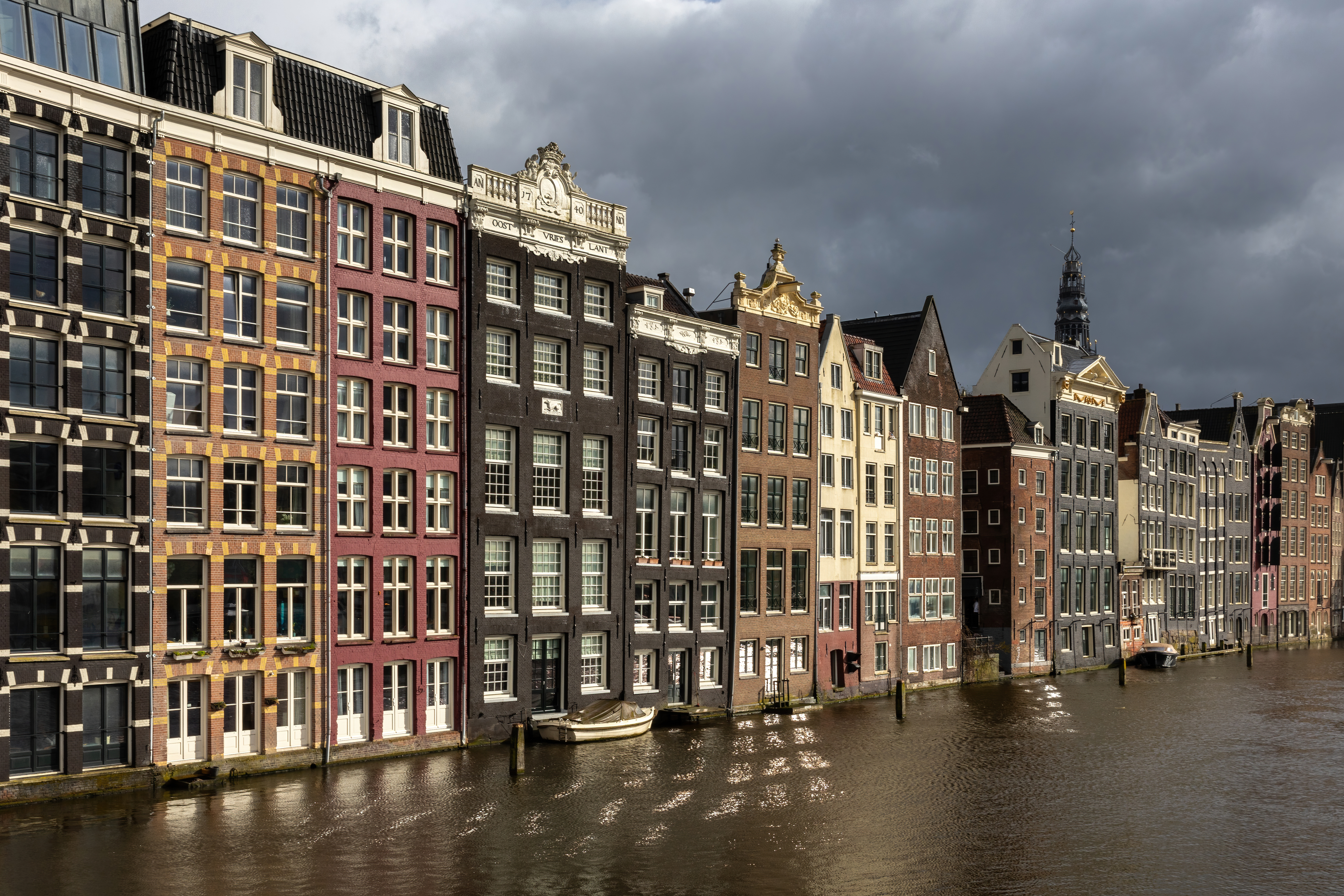
Canal houses in Amsterdam

The standard term for 'Old Town' in the Netherlands is "binnenstad", which translates as "inner city", i.e. within the city walls.

- Oude Stad in Nijmegen
- Oude Stad in Tilburg
- Oude Stad in Amsterdam, UNESCO World Heritage Site
- Oude Stad in Dordrecht
- Oude Stad in Utrecht
- Oude Stad in Groningen
- Oude Stad in Alkmaar
- Oude Stad in Gouda
- Oude Stad in Breda
- Oude Stad in Delft
- Oude Stad in Leeuwarden
- Oude Stad in Arnhem

=== North Macedonia ===
- Historical Center of Ohrid, UNESCO World Heritage Site
- Old Town of Bitola
- Old Bazaar of Skopje
- Old Town of Kruševo

=== Norway ===
- Old Town, Oslo
- Old Town, Ålesund
- Old Town, Bergen
- Old Town, Grimstad

=== Poland ===
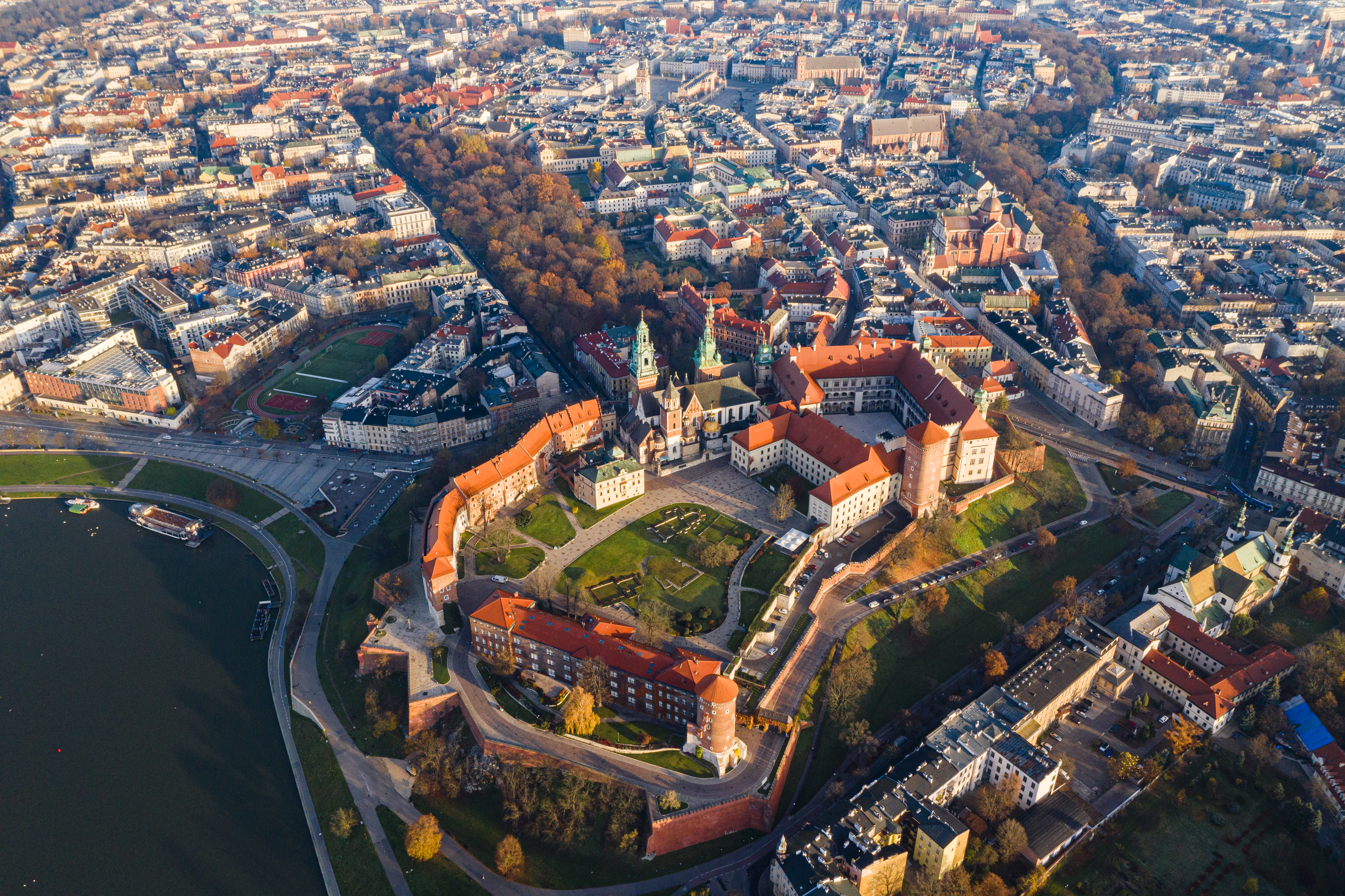
Wawel Royal Castle in Kraków

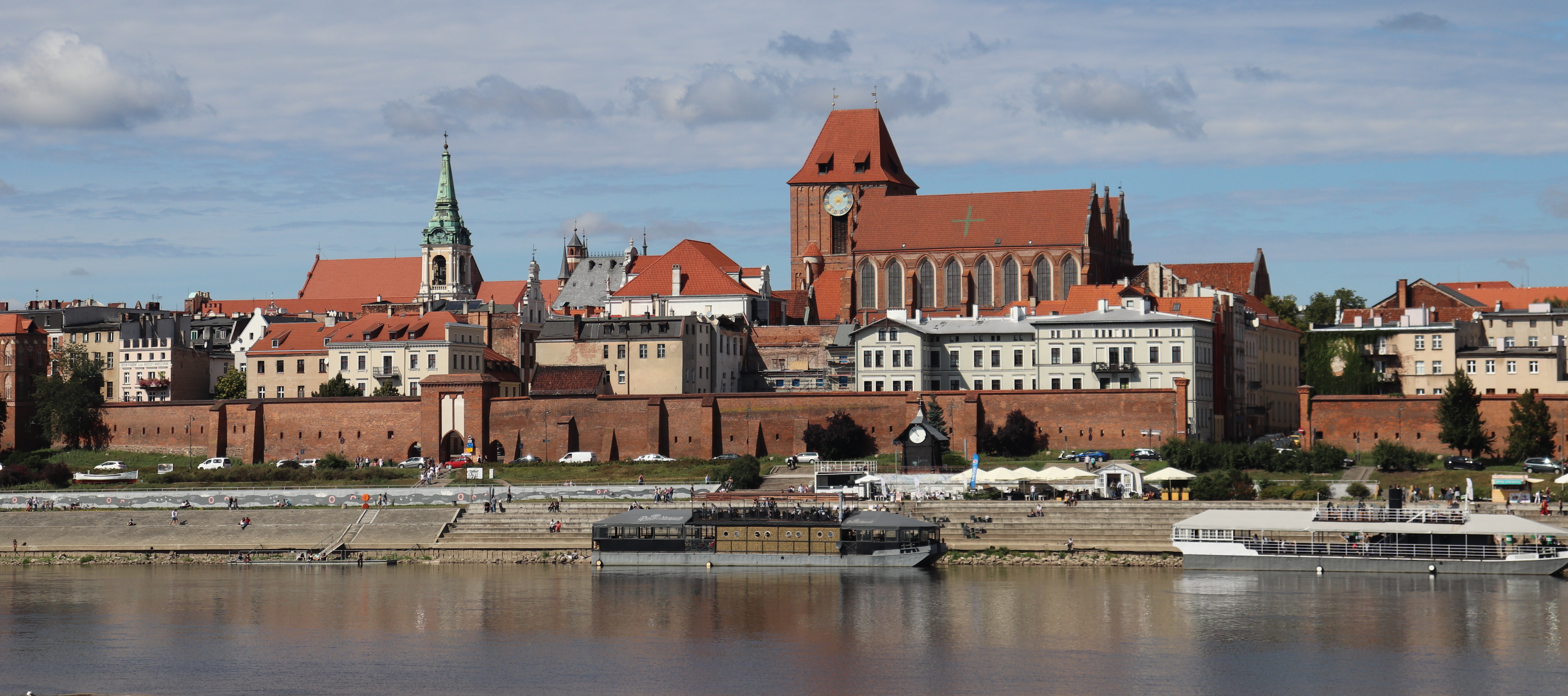
Old town in Toruń

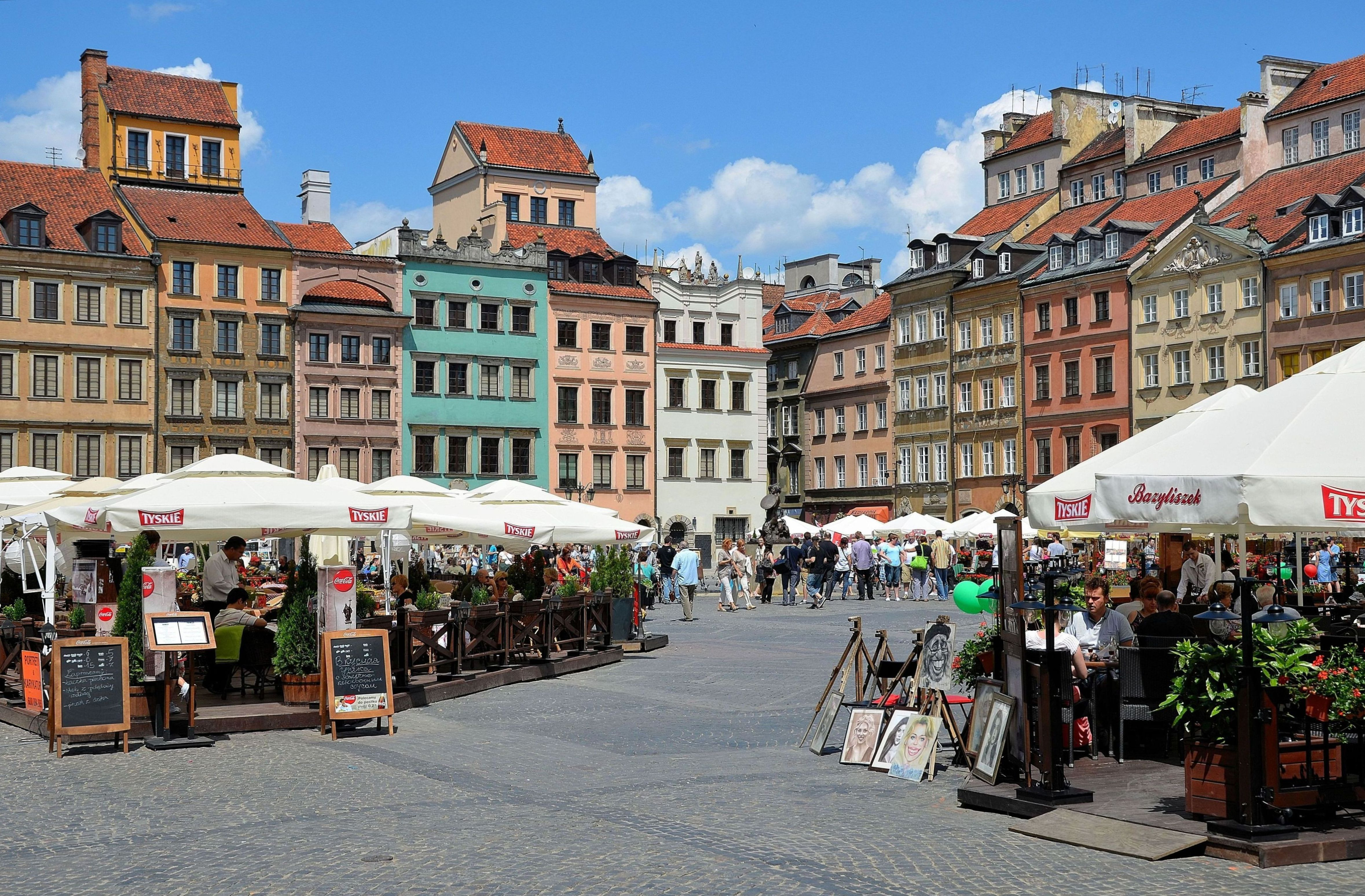
Warsaw's Old Town Market Place

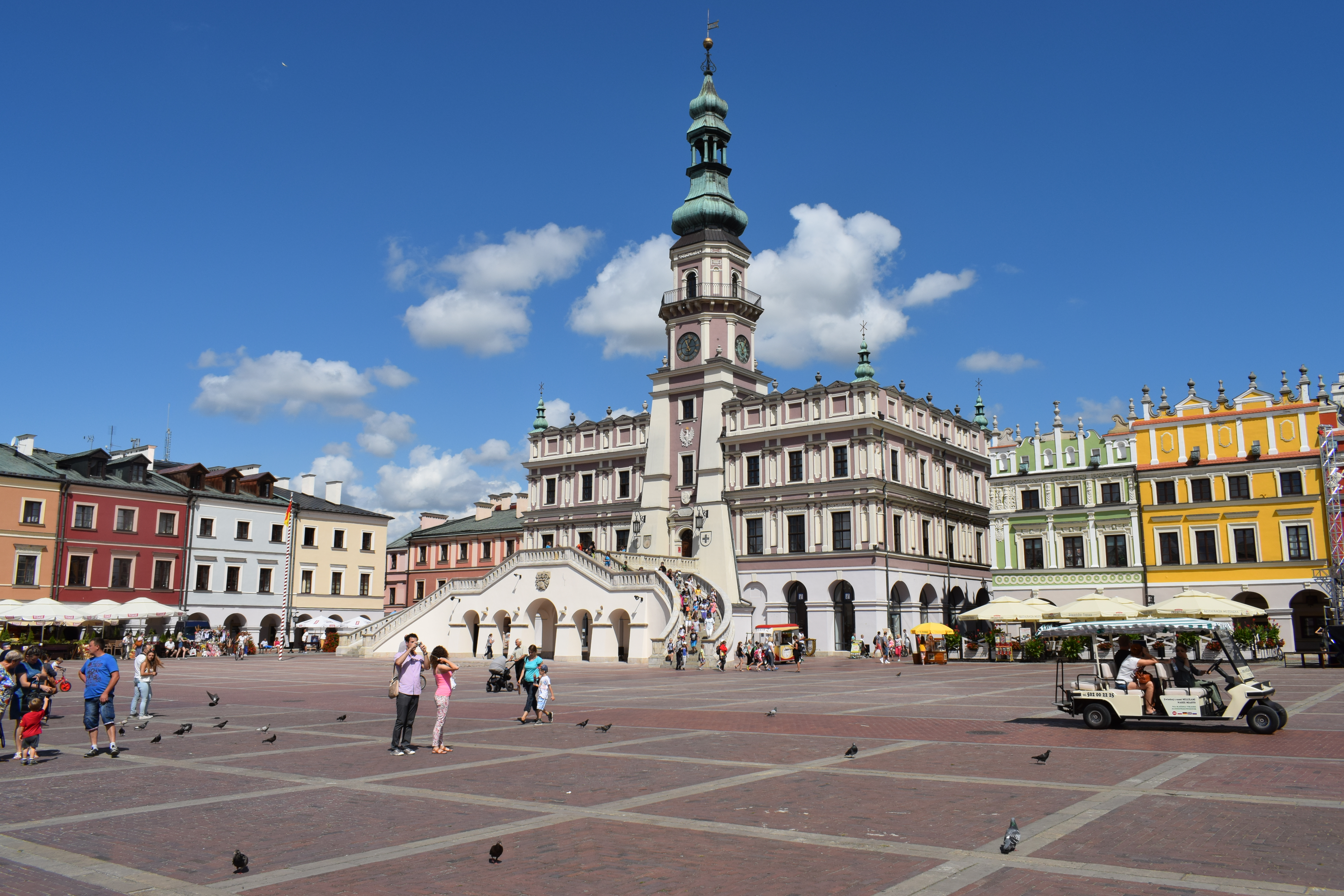
Market Square in Zamość

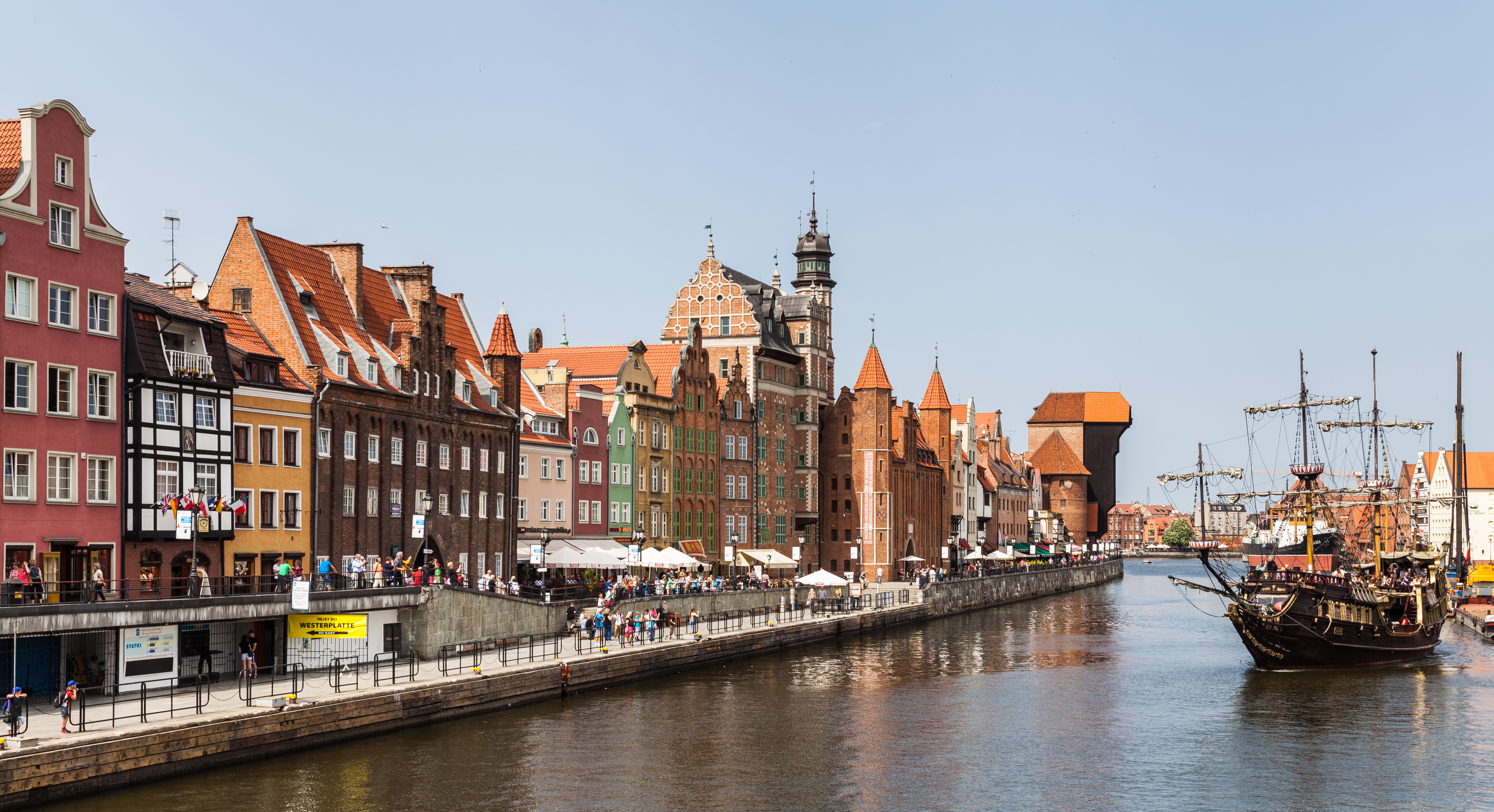
Gdańsk

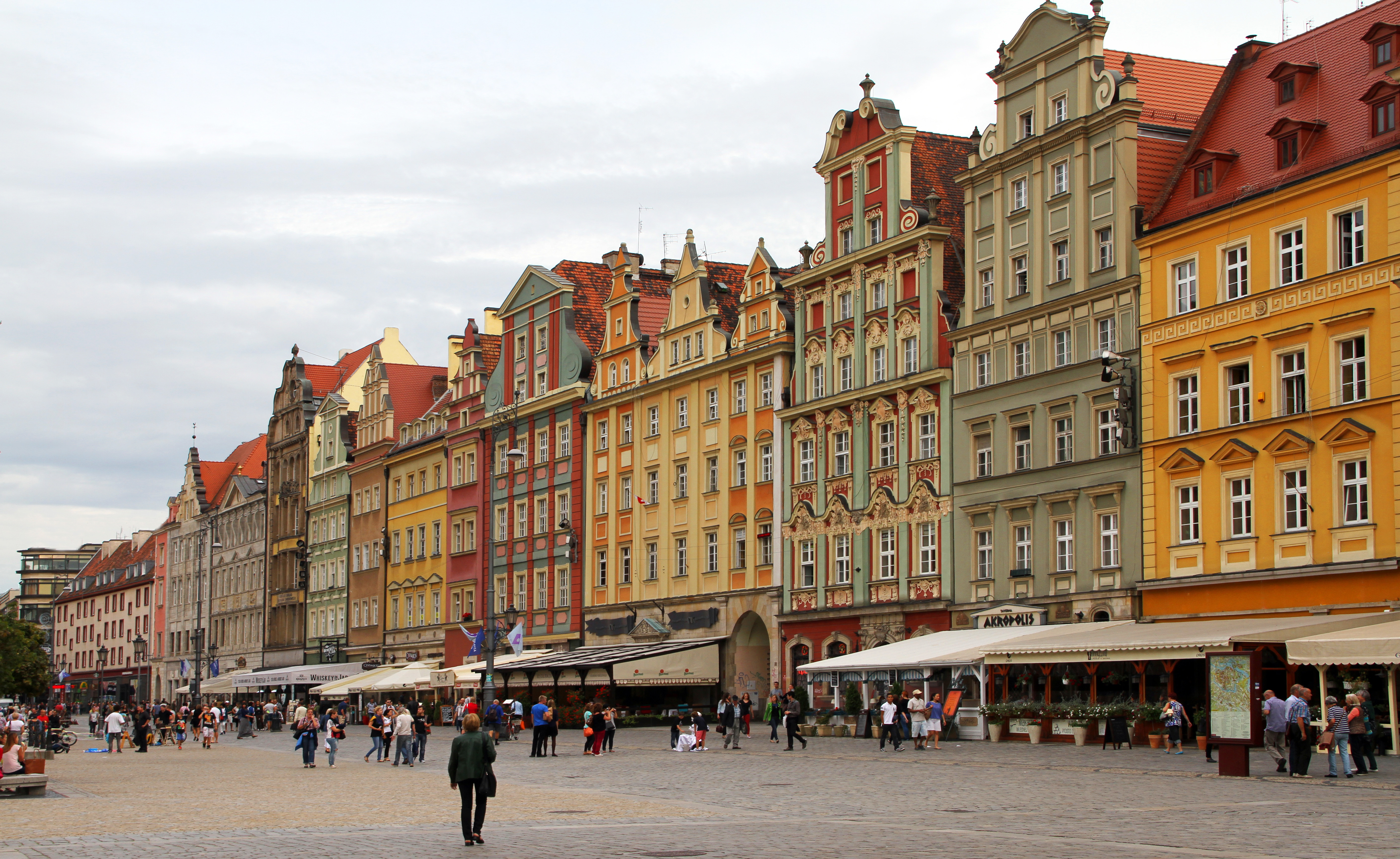
Wrocław Old Town

UNESCO World Heritage old towns in Poland:

- Old town of Kraków
- Old Town of Toruń
- Old town of Warsaw
- Old town of Zamość

Other notable old towns include:

- Old town of Biecz
- Old town of Bielsko-Biała
- Old town of Bolesławiec
- Old town of Brzeg
- Old town of Byczyna
- Old town of Bydgoszcz
- Old town of Bystrzyca Kłodzka
- Old town of Cieszyn
- Old town of Chełmno
- Old town of Darłowo
- Old town of Gdańsk
- Old town of Gliwice
- Old town of Gniezno
- Old town of Grudziądz
- Old town of Jarosław
- Old town of Jelenia Góra
- Old town of Kalisz
- Old town of Kazimierz Dolny
- Old town of Kłodzko
- Old town of Kożuchów
- Old town of Krosno
- Old town of Legnica
- Old town of Leszno
- Old town of Lublin
- Old town of Nowa Ruda
- Old town of Nowe Warpno
- Old town of Nowy Sącz
- Old town of Olsztyn
- Old town of Opole
- Old town of Paczków
- Old town of Piotrków Trybunalski
- Old town of Police
- Old town of Poznań
- Old town of Przemyśl
- Old town of Pszczyna
- Old town of Rawicz
- Old town of Rzeszów
- Old town of Sandomierz
- Old town of Szczecin
- Old town of Stargard Szczeciński
- Old town of Świdnica
- Old town of Tarnów
- Old town of Trzebiatów
- Old town of Wałbrzych
- Old town of Wrocław
- Old town of Ziębice
- Old town of Ząbkowice Śląskie

=== Portugal ===
- Old town in Póvoa de Varzim, named "old town" (Vila Velha) since 1343.
- Old town in Porto, UNESCO World Heritage Site
- Old town in Guimarães, UNESCO World Heritage Site
- Óbidos, Portugal walled city
- Old town of Elvas, UNESCO World Heritage Site
- Old town in Évora, UNESCO World Heritage Site
- Old town in Lisbon

=== Romania ===
- Old town of Sighișoara, a UNESCO World Heritage Site
- Old town of Arad
- Old town of Alba Iulia
- Old town of Botoșani
- Old town of Brașov
- Old town of Brăila
- Old town of Bucharest
- Old town of Cluj Napoca
- Old town of Constanța
- Old town of Craiova
- Old town of Iași
- Old town of Oradea
- Old town of Sibiu
- Old town of Timișoara

=== Russia ===
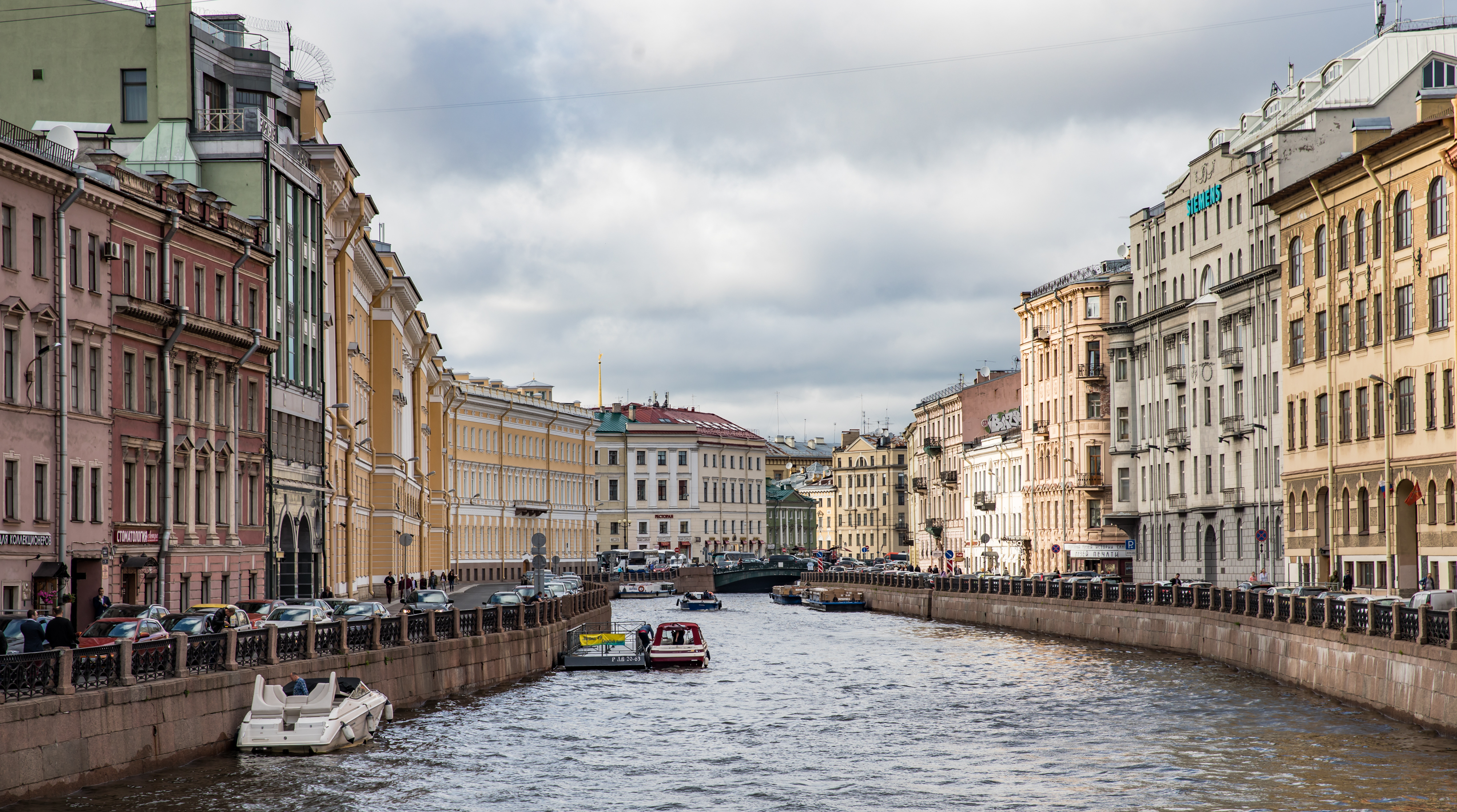
The embankment along the Moyka river, St. Petersburg

==== UNESCO World Heritage Sites ====
- Old town of St. Petersburg, a UNESCO World Heritage Site
- Old town of Veliky Novgorod
- Old town of Derbent
- Historic center of Yaroslavl

===== Central Federal District =====
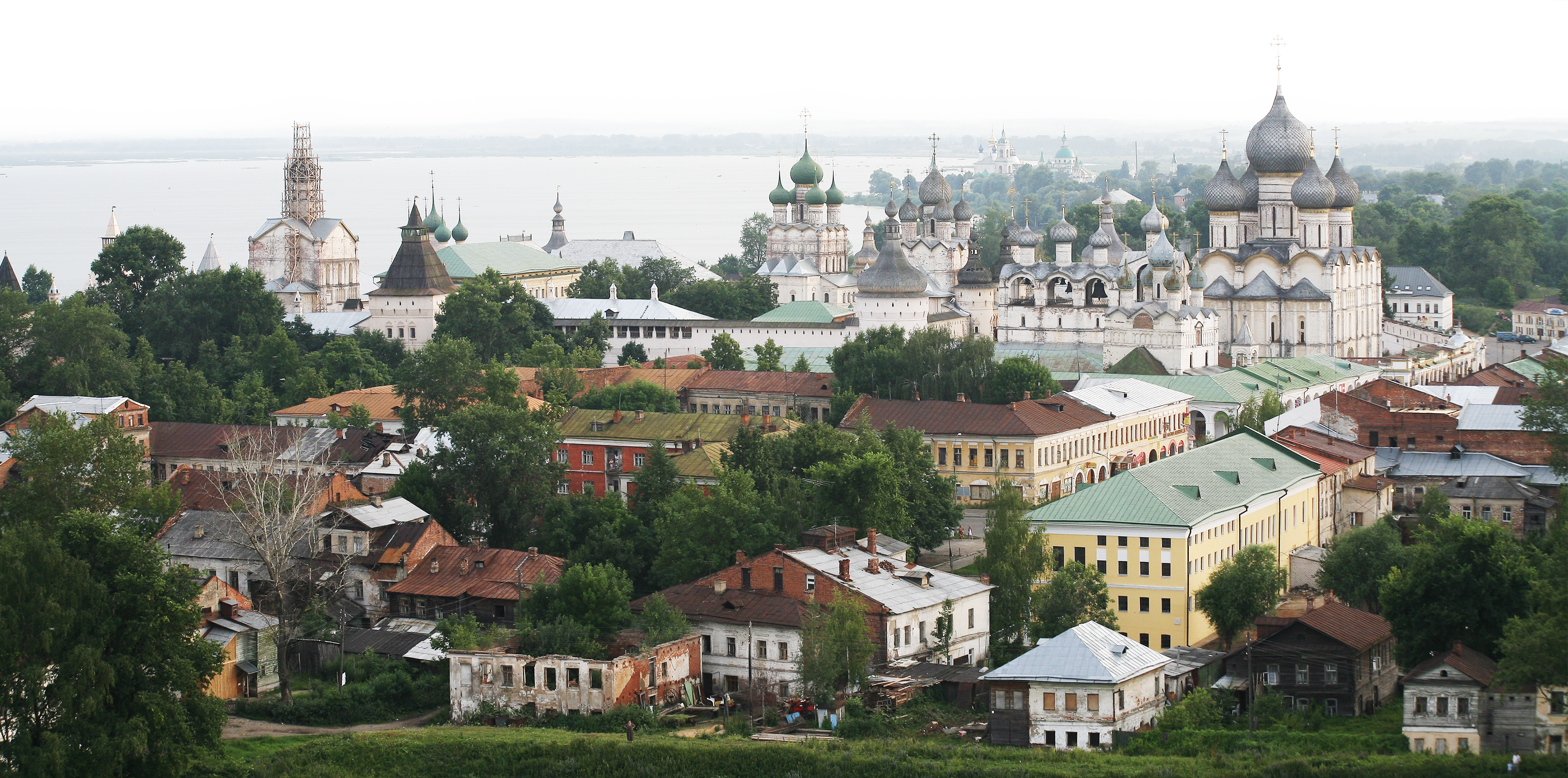
Overview of the Old Town of Rostov

‡ indicates historic settlements of federal importance.

- Historic center of Moscow and Moscow Kremlin
- Historic center of Tula and Tula Kremlin
- Historic center of Tver
- Old Town of Tutayev‡
- Old Town of Kolomna‡
- Old Town of Smolensk‡
- Old Town of Ostashkov‡
- Old Town of Toropets‡
- Old Town of Yelets‡
- Old Town of Torzhok‡
- Old Town of Gorokhovets‡
- Old Town of Galich‡
- Old Town of Kineshma‡
- Old Town of Plyos‡
- Old Town of Shuya‡
- Old Town of Krapivna‡
- Old Town of Zaraysk‡
- Old Town of Kasimov‡
- Old Town of Yegoryevsk
- Old Town of Kaluga
- Old Town of Rybinsk
- Old Town of Zvenigorod and Zvenigorod Kremlin
- Old Town of Dmitrov
- Old Town of Sergiyev Posad
- Old Town of Bezhetsk
- Old Town of Kalyazin
- Old Town of Myshkin
- Old Town of Buy
- Old Town of Palekh
- Old Town of Yuryevets
- Old Town of Gus-Khrustalny
- Old Town of Serpukhov and Serpukhov Kremlin
- Old Town of Borovsk
- Old Town of Tarusa
- Old Town of Belyov
- Old Town of Skopin
- Old Town of Pronsk
- Old Town of Kadom
- Old Town of Oryol
- Old Town of Ostrogozhsk
- Old Town of Roslavl
- Old Town of Vyazma
- Golden Ring of Russia
  - Old Murom
  - Old Kostroma
  - Old Suzdal
  - Old Vladimir
  - Old Rostov Velikiy
  - Old Uglich

===== Volga Federal District =====
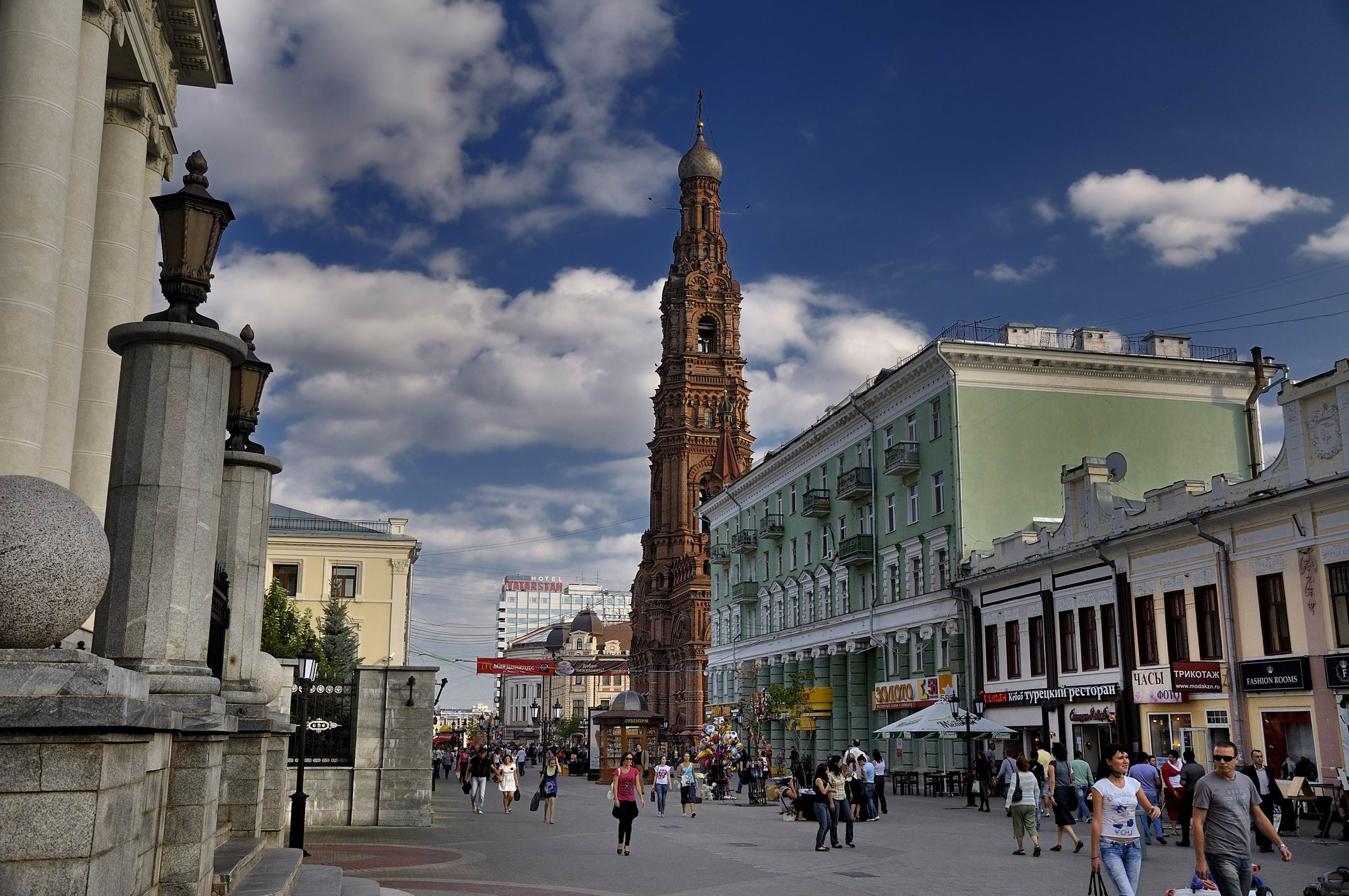
Street in the Old Town of Kazan

- Historic center of Kazan and the Kazan Kremlin, UNESCO World Heritage Site
- Historic center of Nizhny Novgorod and the Nizhny Novgorod Kremlin
- Historic center of Saratov
- Historic center of Orenburg
- Historic center of Samara
- Historic center of Kirov
- Old Town of Volsk, historic settlement of federal importance
- Old Town of Arzamas, historic settlement of federal importance
- Old Town of Yelabuga, historic settlement of federal importance
- Old Town of Chistopol, historic settlement of federal importance
- Old Town of Bolgar, UNESCO World Heritage Site
- Old Town of Gorodets
- Old Town of Sarov

===== Northwestern Federal District =====
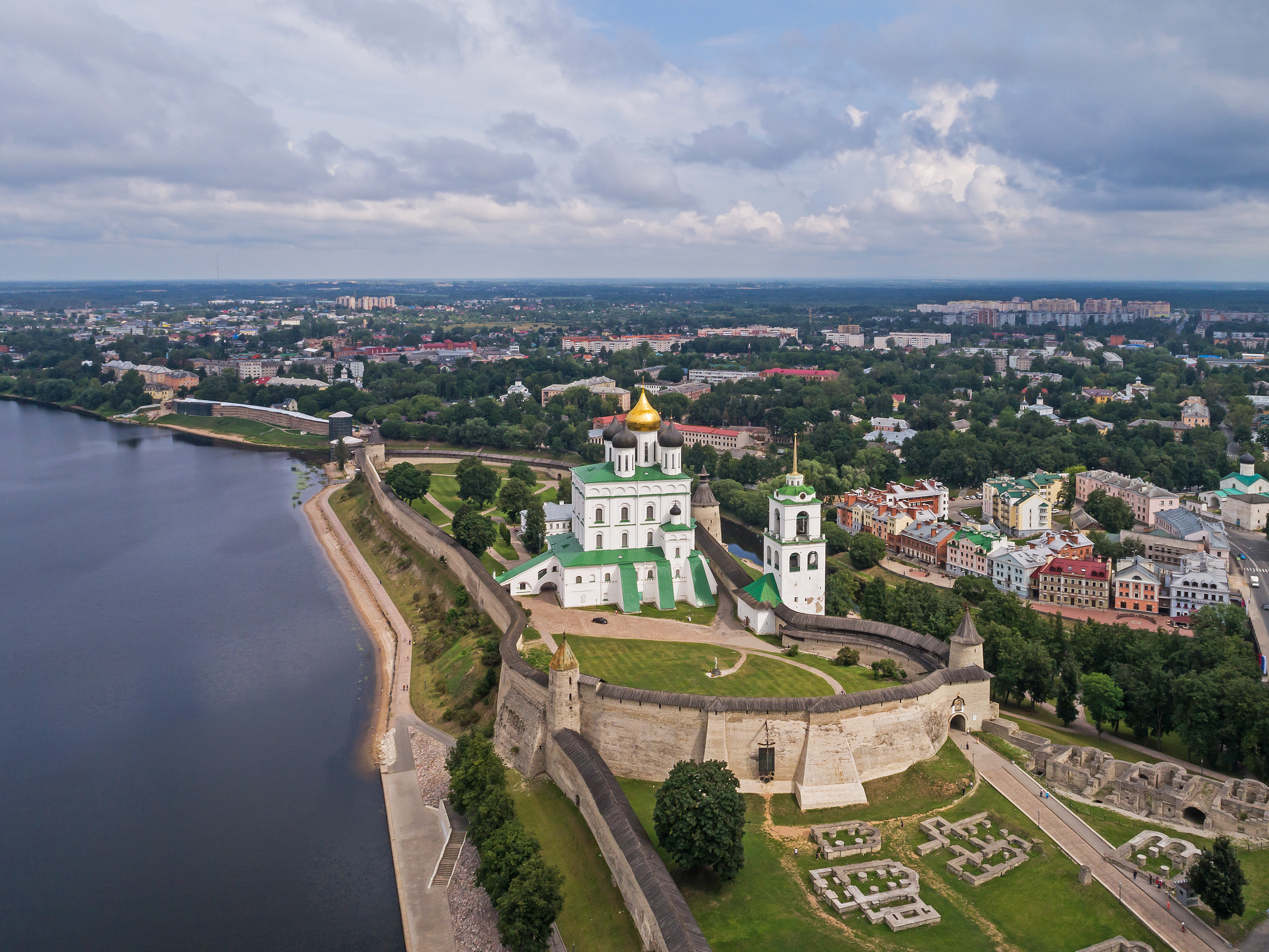
Ensemble of Pskov Kremlin

- Historic center of Pskov and Pskov Kremlin
- Historic center of Vyborg
- Historic center of Vologda
- Historic center of Arkhangelsk
- Old Town of Kargopol, historic settlement of federal importance
- Old Town of Staraya Russa, historic settlement of federal importance
- Old Town of Belozersk, historic settlement of federal importance
- Old Town of Veliky Ustyug, historic settlement of federal importance
- Old Town of Totma, historic settlement of federal importance
- Old Town of Solvychegodsk, historic settlement of federal importance
- Old Town of Petrozavodsk
- Old Town of Gatchina
- Old Town of Syktyvkar
- Russian East Prussia (Kaliningrad Oblast)
  - Old Königsberg or Kaliningrad (Amalienau district)
  - Old Tilsit (Sovyetsk)
  - Old Insterburg (Chernyakhovsk)
  - Old Rauschen (Svetlogorsk)
  - Old Kranz (Zelenogradsk)
  - Old Gumbinnen (Gusev)
  - Old Tapiau (Gvardeysk)

===== Southern Federal District =====
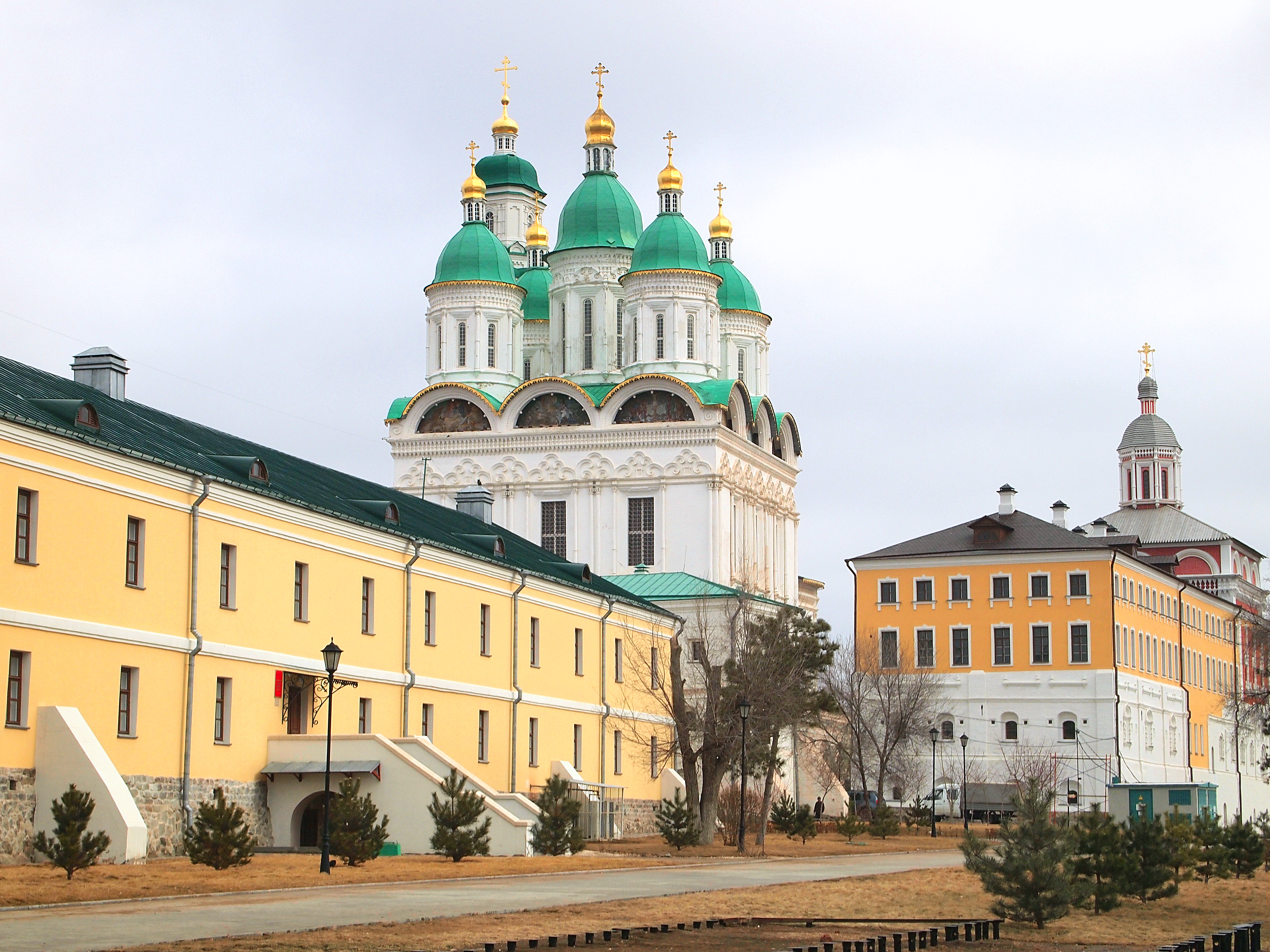
Astrakhan Kremlin

- Historic center of Rostov-on-Don
- Historic center of Krasnodar
- Historic center of Volgograd
- Historic center of Astrakhan and Astrakhan kremlin
- Old Town of Azov, historic settlement of federal importance
- Old Town of Taganrog, historic settlement of federal importance
- Old Town of Yeysk
- Old Town of Maykop
- Old Town of Uryupinsk
- Old Town of Armavir

===== North Caucasian Federal District =====
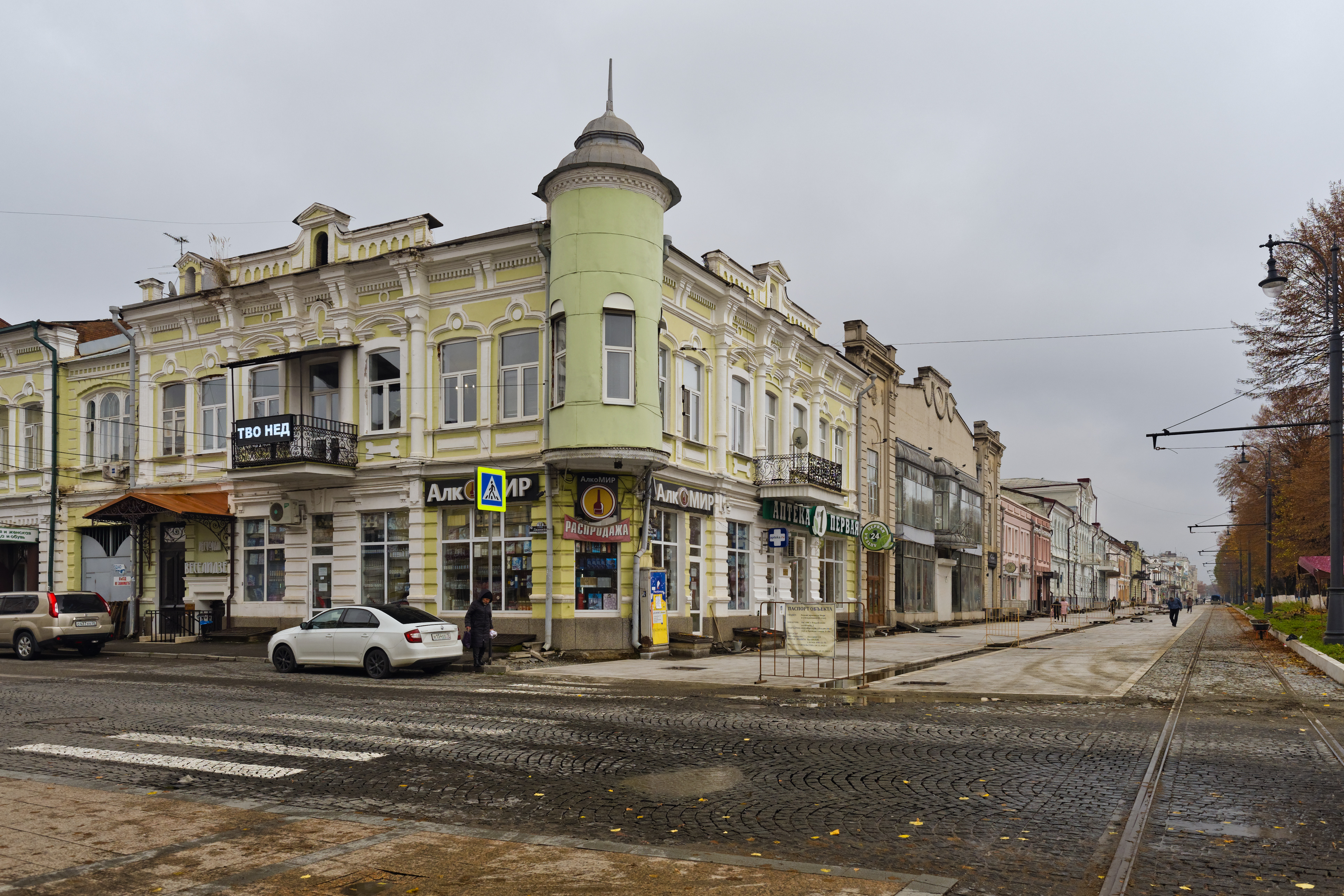
Street in Vladikavkaz

- Historic center of Vladikavkaz
- Historic center of Pyatigorsk
- Historic center of Stavropol
- Old Town of Kislovodsk
- Old Town of Georgievsk

===== Ural Federal District =====
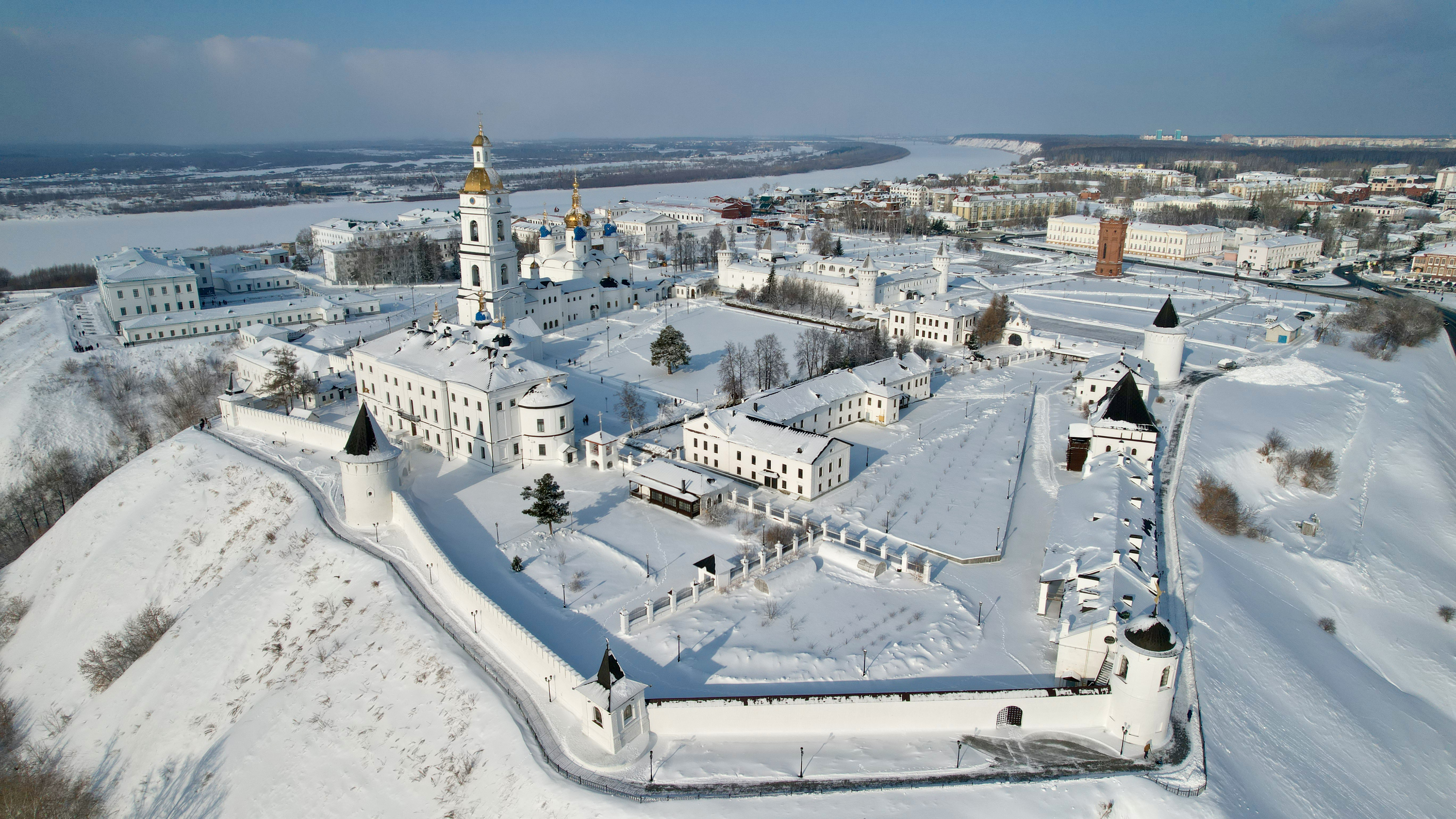
Tobolsk Kremlin

- Historic center of Yekaterinburg
- Historic center of Tyumen
- Old Town of Verkhoturye, historic settlement of federal importance
- Old Town of Tobolsk and Tobolsk Kremlin

===== Siberian Federal District =====
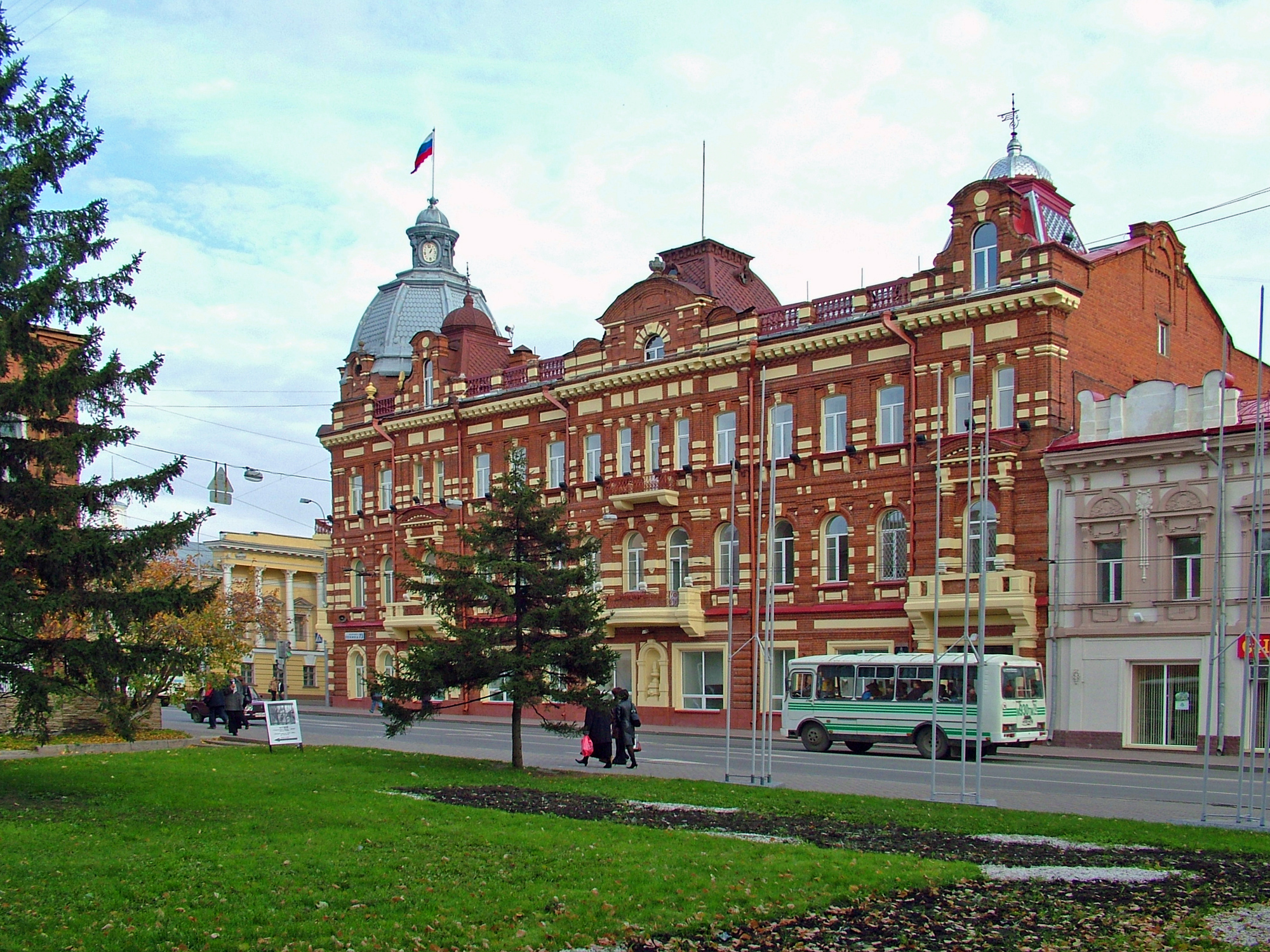
Historical center of Tomsk

- Historic center of Tomsk, historic settlement of federal importance
- Historic center of Irkutsk, historic settlement of federal importance
- Historic center of Krasnoyarsk
- Historic center of Omsk
- Old Town of Yeniseysk, historic settlement of federal importance

===== Far Eastern Federal District =====
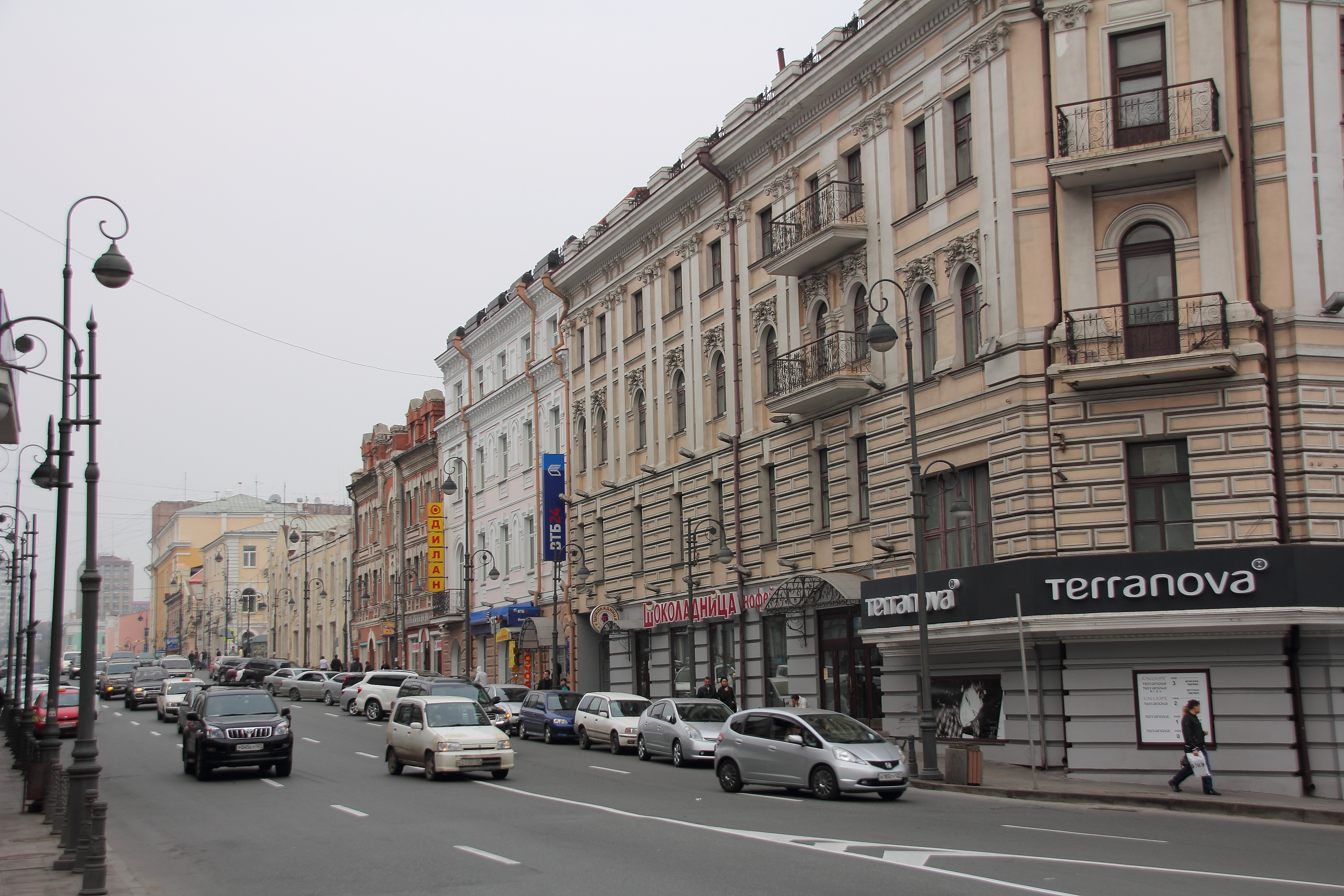
A street in Old Vladivostok

- Historic center of Vladivostok
- Historic center of Blagoveshchensk
- Historic center of Khabarovsk
- Old Town of Kyakhta, historic settlement of federal importance
- Old Town of Nerchinsk
- Old Town of Chita
- Old Town of Komsomolsk-on-Amur

=== Serbia ===
- Stari Grad, a neighborhood in Novi Sad
- Petrovaradin suburb
- Stari Grad, Sremski Karlovci - Cultural Heritage of Extraordinary importance
- Stari Grad, Kikinda - Cultural Heritage of Extraordinary importance
- Stari Grad, Zrenjanin - Cultural Heritage of Extraordinary importance
- Stari Grad, Bečej - Cultural Heritage of Extraordinary importance
- Stari Grad, Sombor - Cultural Heritage of Extraordinary importance
- Stari Grad, Pančevo - Cultural Heritage of Extraordinary importance
- Stari Grad, Subotica - Cultural Heritage of Extraordinary importance
- Stari Grad, Sremska Mitrovica - Cultural Heritage of Extraordinary importance
- Stari Grad, Zemun - Cultural Heritage of Extraordinary importance
- Stari Grad, a municipality in Belgrade
- Stara čaršija, Grocka, Belgrade - Two quarters of Old City are a Cultural Heritage of Extraordinary importance
- Tešnjar, Valjevo - Cultural Heritage of Extraordinary importance
- Stara čaršija, Novi Pazar - Cultural Heritage of Extraordinary importance
- Stari Grad, a municipality in Kragujevac
- Stari Grad, the remains of a fort in Užice
- Stari Grad, Ivanjica - Cultural Heritage of Extraordinary importance
- Stari Grad, Negotin - Cultural Heritage of Extraordinary importance
- Old Town of Prizren
- Old Bazaar of Đakovica

=== Slovakia ===
- Staré Mesto in Bratislava
- Staré Mesto in Košice
- Staré Mesto in Nitra

=== Spain ===
UNESCO World Heritage old towns in Spain

- Alcalá de Henares (Madrid)
- Ávila (Castile and León)
- Baeza (Andalusia)
- Cáceres (Extremadura)
- Córdoba (Andalusia)
- Cuenca (Castile-La Mancha)
- Salamanca (Castile and León)
- San Cristóbal de La Laguna (Canary Islands)
- Santiago de Compostela (Galicia)
- Segovia (Castile and León)
- Toledo (Castile-La Mancha)
- Úbeda (Andalusia)

Other notable/famous old towns include:

- Almagro (Castile-La Mancha)
- Andújar (Andalusia)
- Avilés (Asturias)
- Bilbao (Basque Country)
- Burgos (Castile and León)
- Cádiz (Andalusia)
- Girona (Catalonia)
- Granada (Andalusia)
- Hondarribia (Basque Country)
- Ibiza (Balearic Islands)
- Las Palmas (Canary Islands)
- León (Castile and León)
- Lorca (Murcia)
- Lugo (Galicia)
- Madrid (Madrid)
- Ourense (Galicia)
- Oviedo (Asturias)
- Palma de Mallorca (Balearic Islands)
- Pamplona (Navarre)
- Peniscola (Valencian Community)
- Pontevedra (Galicia)
- Priego de Córdoba (Andalusia)
- San Sebastián (Basque Country)
- San Roque (Andalusia)
- Sanlúcar de Barrameda (Andalusia)
- Seville (Andalusia)
- Solsona (Catalonia)
- Tafalla (Navarre)
- Tarragona (Catalonia)
- Teruel (Aragón)
- Toro (Castile and León)
- Trujillo (Extremadura)
- Tudela (Navarre)
- Vitoria-Gasteiz (Basque Country)
- Zamora (Castile and León)

=== Sweden ===
- Gamla staden, Malmö
- Gamla stan, Stockholm
- Gamlestaden, Gothenburg
- Gammelstaden, Luleå Municipality, UNESCO World Heritage Site
- Visby, Region Gotland, UNESCO

=== Switzerland ===
- Bern, UNESCO World Heritage Site
- Zürich, District 1
- Old Town of Geneva
- Old Town of Solothurn
- Old Town of Basel
- Old Town of Lucerne
- Old Town of Lausanne
- Old Town of St.Gallen
- Old Town of Fribourg
- Old Town of Aarau
- Old Town of Thun
- Old Town of Neuchâtel
- Old Town of Lugano
- Old Town of Vevey
- Old Town of Gruyères
- Old town of Biel
- Old town of Sion
- Old town of Zug

=== Turkey ===
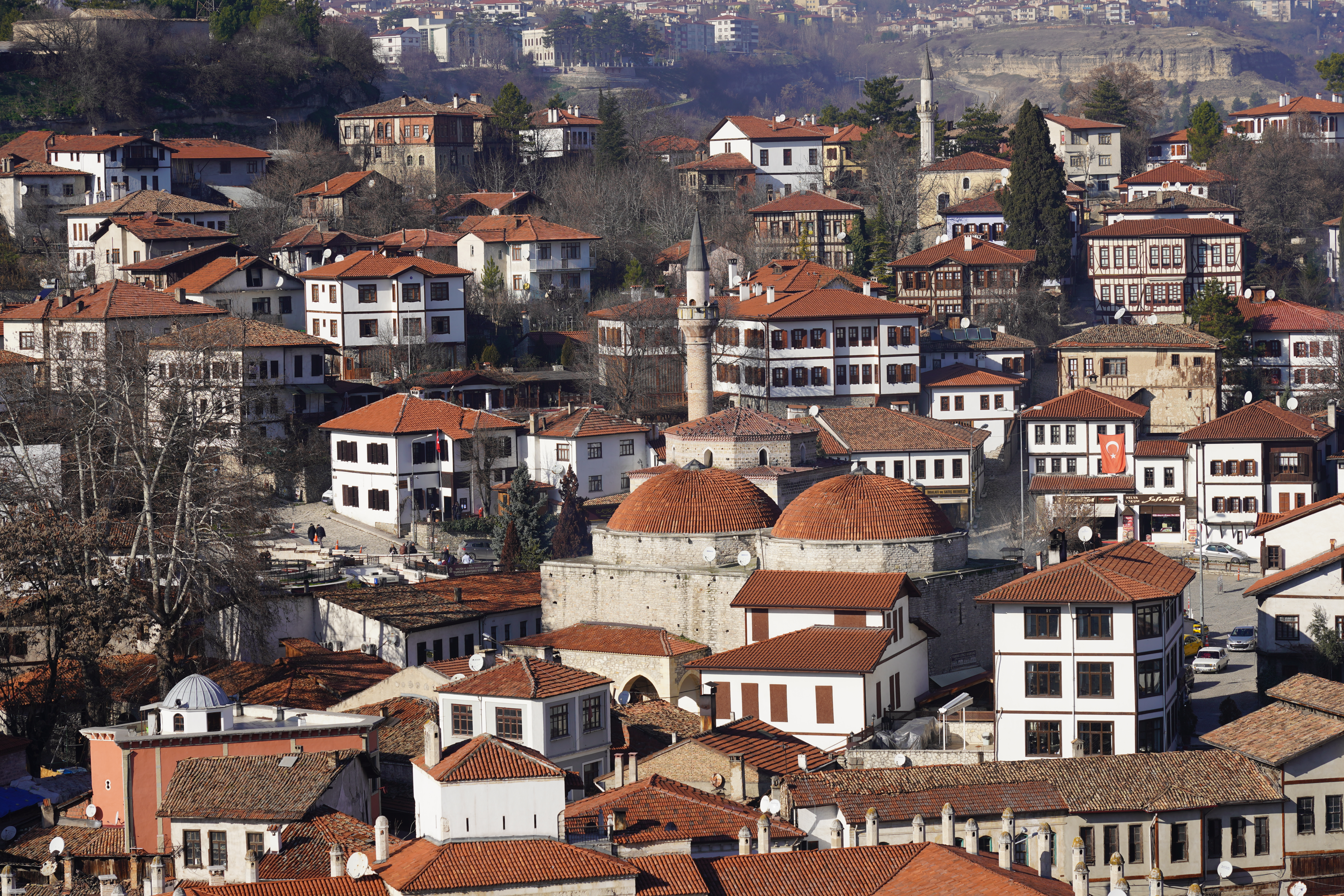
Old Town of Safranbolu, UNESCO World Heritage site

==== UNESCO ====
- Istanbul, Historic Peninsula (Fatih district), UNESCO World Heritage site
- Bursa, Historic city center, UNESCO World Heritage site
- Cumalıkızık, UNESCO World Heritage site
- Safranbolu, UNESCO World Heritage site

==== Aegan region ====
- Old Town of Foça
- Old Town of Alaçatı
- Old Town of Çeşme
- Old Town of Sığacık
- Şirince
- Old Town of Doğanbey
- Birgi
- Old Town of Bodrum
- Old Town of Marmaris
- Old Town of Yeşilüzümlü
- Old Town of Buldan
- Old Town of Babadağ
- Old Town of Kula
- Old Town of Kütahya
- Old Town of Afyonkarahisar

==== Black Sea Region ====
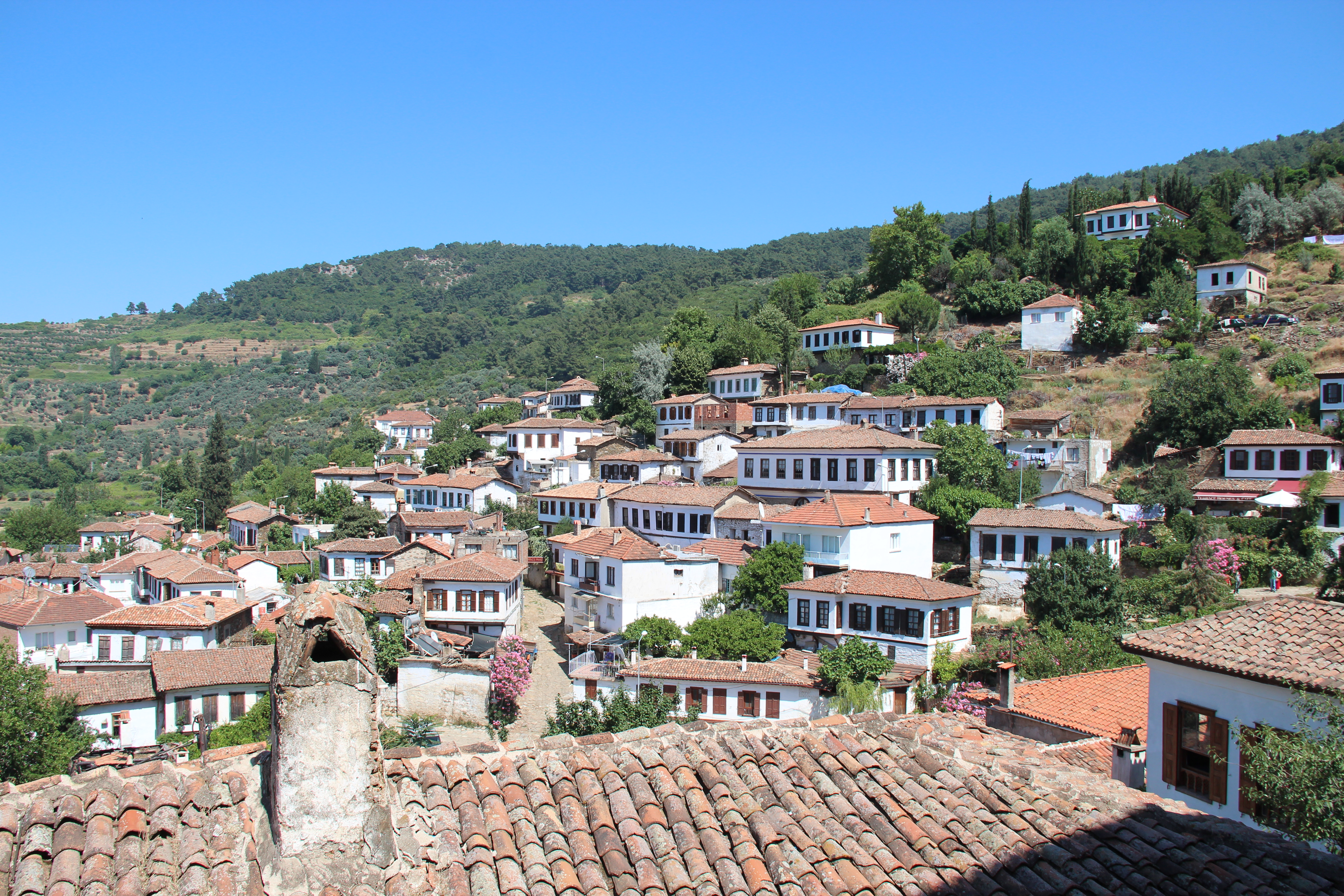
Old Şirince

- Old Town of Göynük
- Mudurnu
- Old Town of Akçakoca
- Old Town of Kastamonu
- Amasya, Historic city center
- Old Town of Bartın
- Old Town of Tokat

==== Central Anatolia Region ====
- Ankara, Historic city center (Altındağ district)
- Eskişehir, Historic city district (Odunpazarı district)
- Konya, Historic city district
- Kayseri, Historic city district
- Old Town of Çankırı
- Beypazarı
- Old Town of Sivrihisar
- Old Town of Güzelyurt
- Old Town of Niğde
- Cappadocia (UNESCO World Heritage site)
  - Old Avanos
  - Old Çavuşin
  - Old Uçhisar
  - Old Ürgüp
  - Old Mustafapaşa
  - Old Ortahisar

==== Eastern Anatolia Region ====
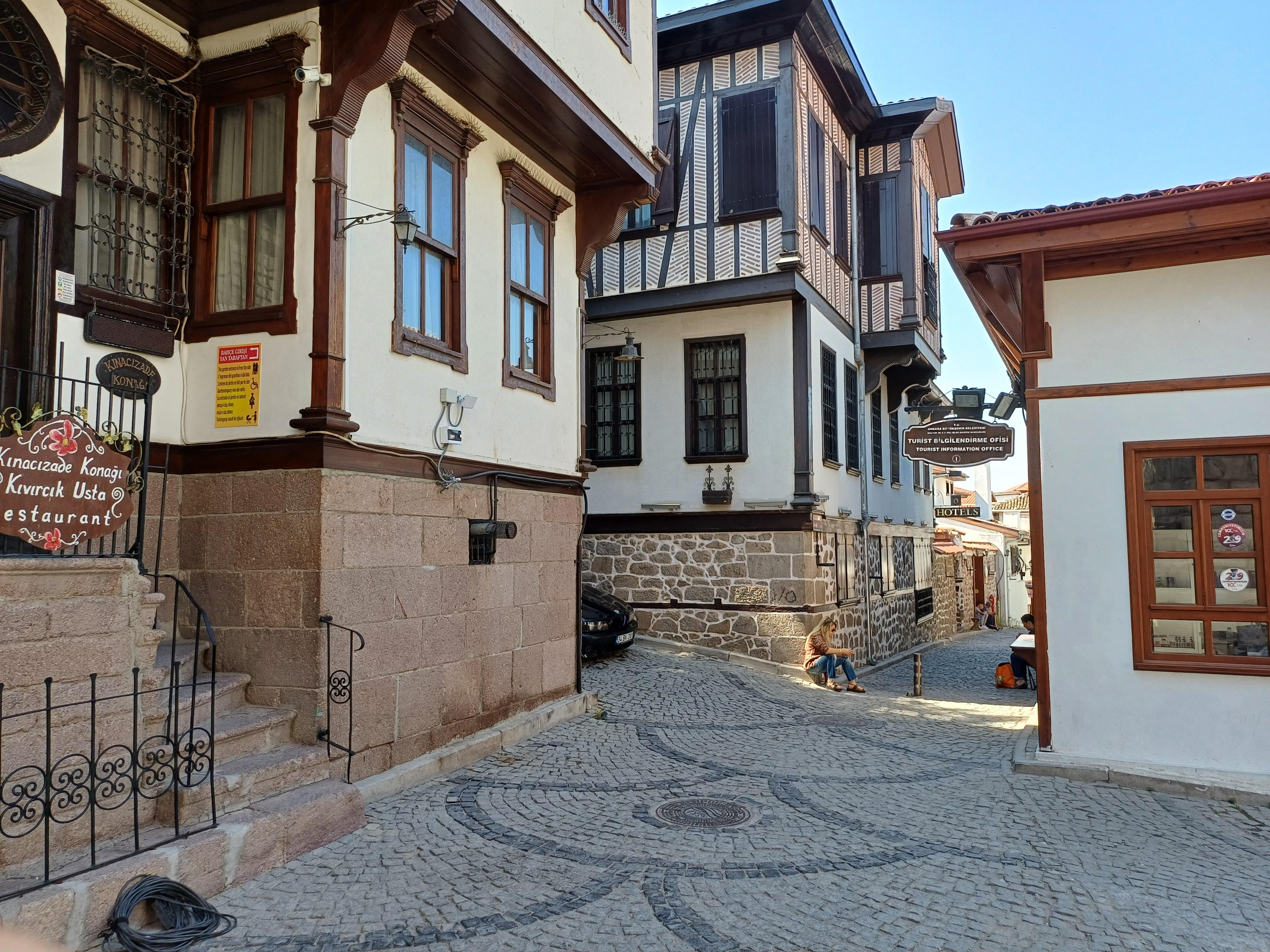
Old Houses in Ankara

- Malatya, Historic city district (Yeşilyurt district)
- Old Kemaliye
- Old Town of Bitlis
- Old Malatya (Battalgazi)
- Old Town of Çukurca
- Old Town of Kars

==== Marmara Region ====
- Old Town of Edirne
- Old Town of Çanakkale
- Old Town of Mudanya
- Bozcaada
- Old Town of Osmaneli
- Old Taraklı
- Old Town of İzmit

==== Mediterranean Region ====
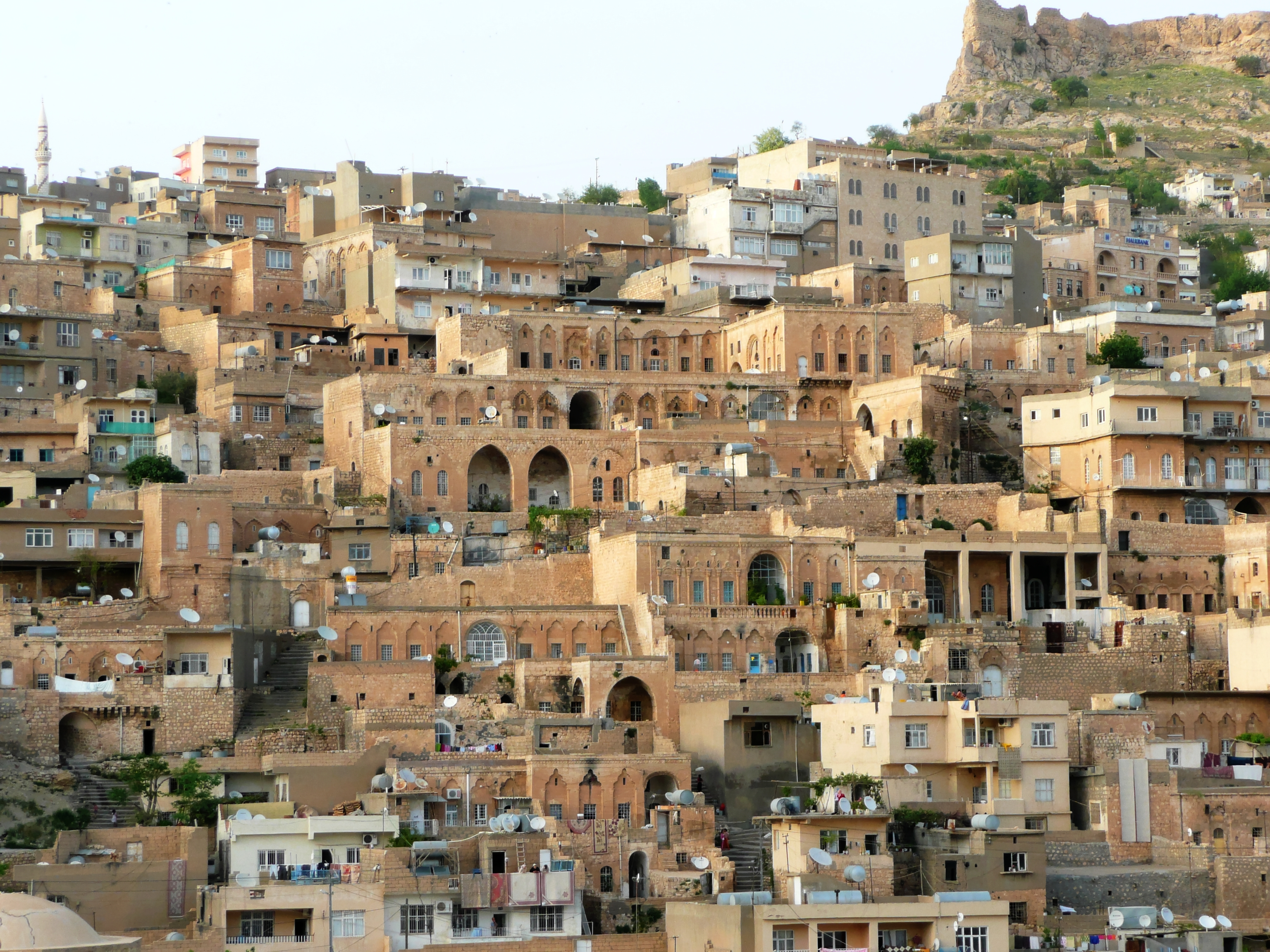
An overview of the Old Town of Mardin

- Antalya, Historic city district (Kaleiçi)
- Adana, Historic city district (Tepebağ)
- Old City of Antakya
- Old Town of Tarsus
- Old Town of Alanya
- Kaleköy
- Ormana

==== Southeastern Anatolia Region ====
- Gaziantep, Historic city district (Bey Mahallesi)
- Old Urfa
- Harran
- Old Town of Uludere
- Tur Abdin Region
  - Old Town of Mardin
  - Old Town of Midyat
  - Iwardo
  - Dayro da-Slibo
  - Anhel

=== Ukraine ===
- Stare Misto in Lviv, UNESCO World Heritage site
- Historic Centre of Odesa, UNESCO World Heritage site
- Old Kyiv
- Old Kamianets-Podilskyi
- Old Kharkiv
- Old Chernivtsi
- Old Uzhhorod
- Old Chernihiv
- Old Ternopil

=== United Kingdom ===
==== England ====
- UNESCO World Heritage old towns in England:
  - City of Bath
  - Maritime Greenwich
  - Liverpool Maritime Mercantile City
- Old Town, Barnsley
- Old Town, Chard
- Old Town, Croydon
- Old Town, hamlet near Mansergh, Cumbria
- Old Town, Eastbourne
- Old Town, Hastings
- Old Town, Isles of Scilly
- Old Town, Kingston upon Hull
- Old Town, hamlet near Otterburn, Northumberland
- Old Town, Southampton, a district of the city of Southampton
- Old Town, Swindon
- Old Town, West Yorkshire

==== Northern Ireland ====
- Old Town, Derry, the historic fortified core of Derry

==== Scotland ====
- Old Town, Edinburgh, a UNESCO World Heritage Site, along with the New Town, Edinburgh

==== Wales ====
- Holyhead Old Town, a townscape heritage conservation area with the best surviving Roman Fort in Wales

==== Overseas territories ====
- Historic Town of St George, Bermuda, a UNESCO World Heritage Site

== Middle East ==
=== Israel and Palestine ===
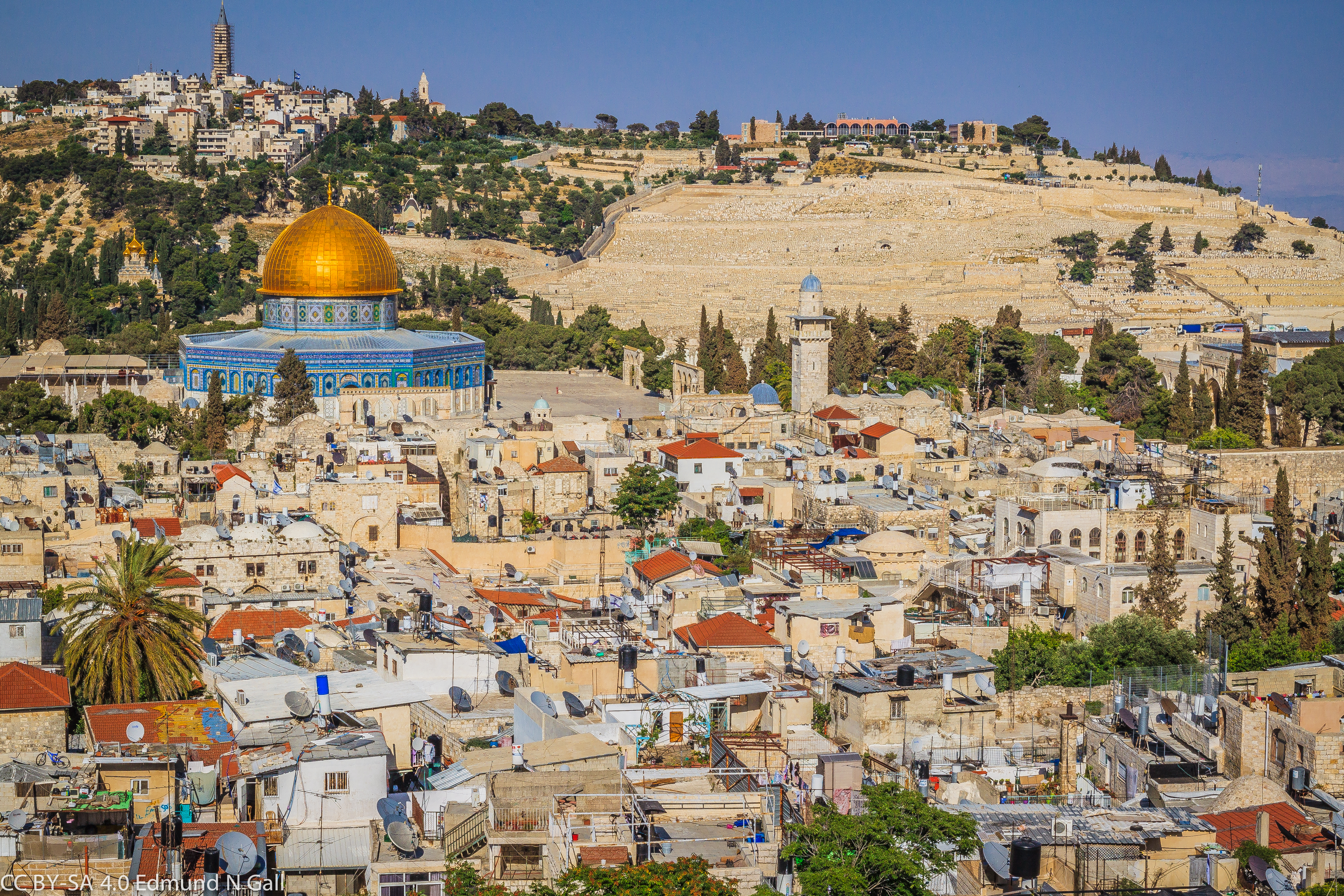
Old City of Jerusalem

- Old City of Jerusalem, UNESCO World Heritage Site
- Old City of Acre, UNESCO World Heritage Site
- Old City of Beersheba
- Old City of Haifa
- Old Jaffa
- Old City of Nazareth
- Old City of Bethlehem
- Old City of Ramle
- Old City of Hebron, UNESCO World Heritage Site
- Old City of Nablus
- Old City of Tiberias
- Old City of Safed

=== Lebanon ===
- Old Byblos, UNESCO World Heritage Site
- Old Sidon
- Old Tripoli
- Old Tyre, UNESCO World Heritage Site
- Beirut Central District
- Old Batroun
- Deir el Qamar
- Rachaya

=== Saudi Arabia ===
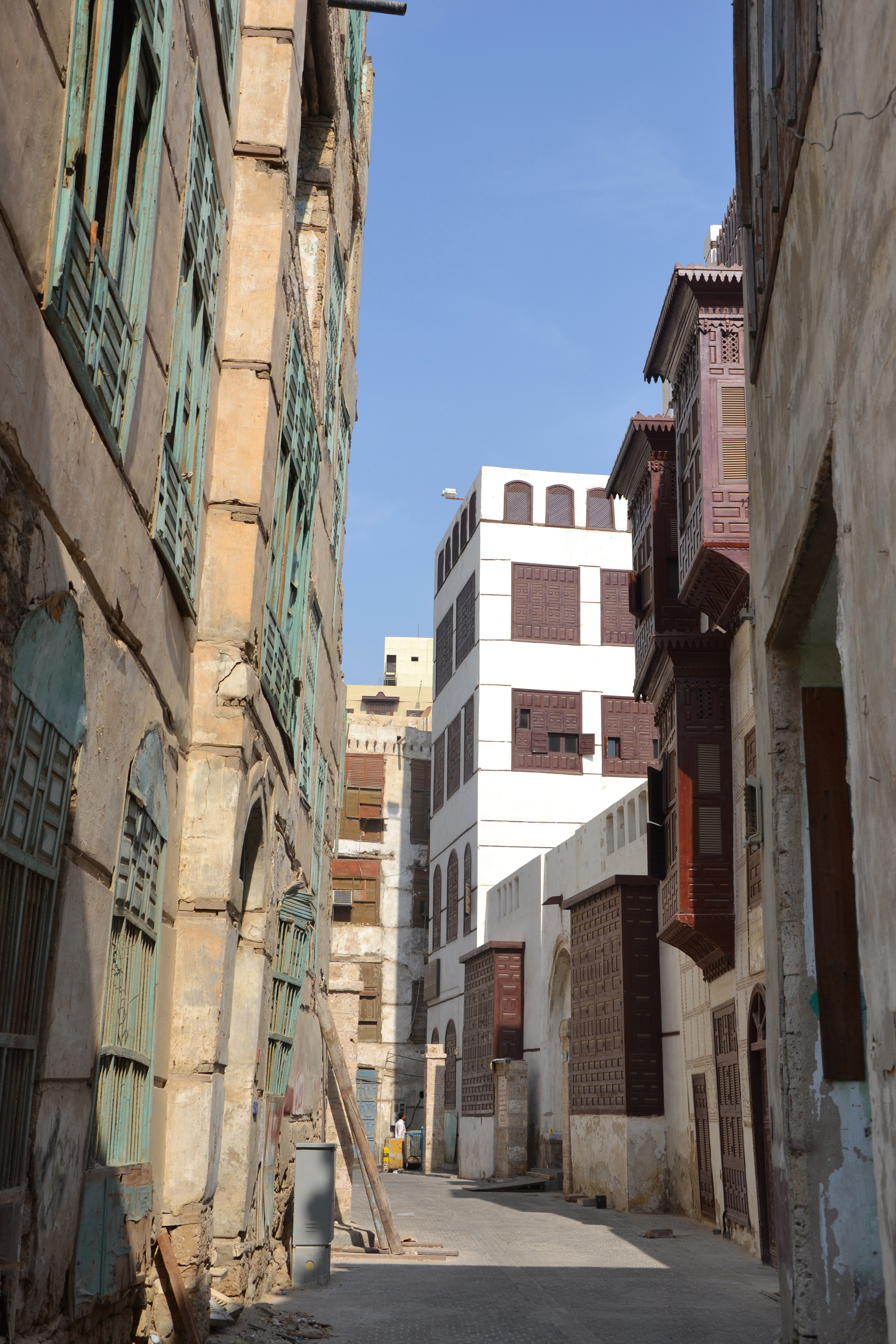
Historic houses of Jeddah

- At-Turaif District, Diriyah in Riyadh, UNESCO World Heritage Site
- Al-Balad, Jeddah, UNESCO World Heritage Site

=== Syria ===
- Ancient City of Aleppo, UNESCO World Heritage Site
- Ancient City of Bosra, UNESCO World Heritage Site
- Ancient City of Damascus, UNESCO World Heritage Site
- Old Tartus

=== Yemen ===
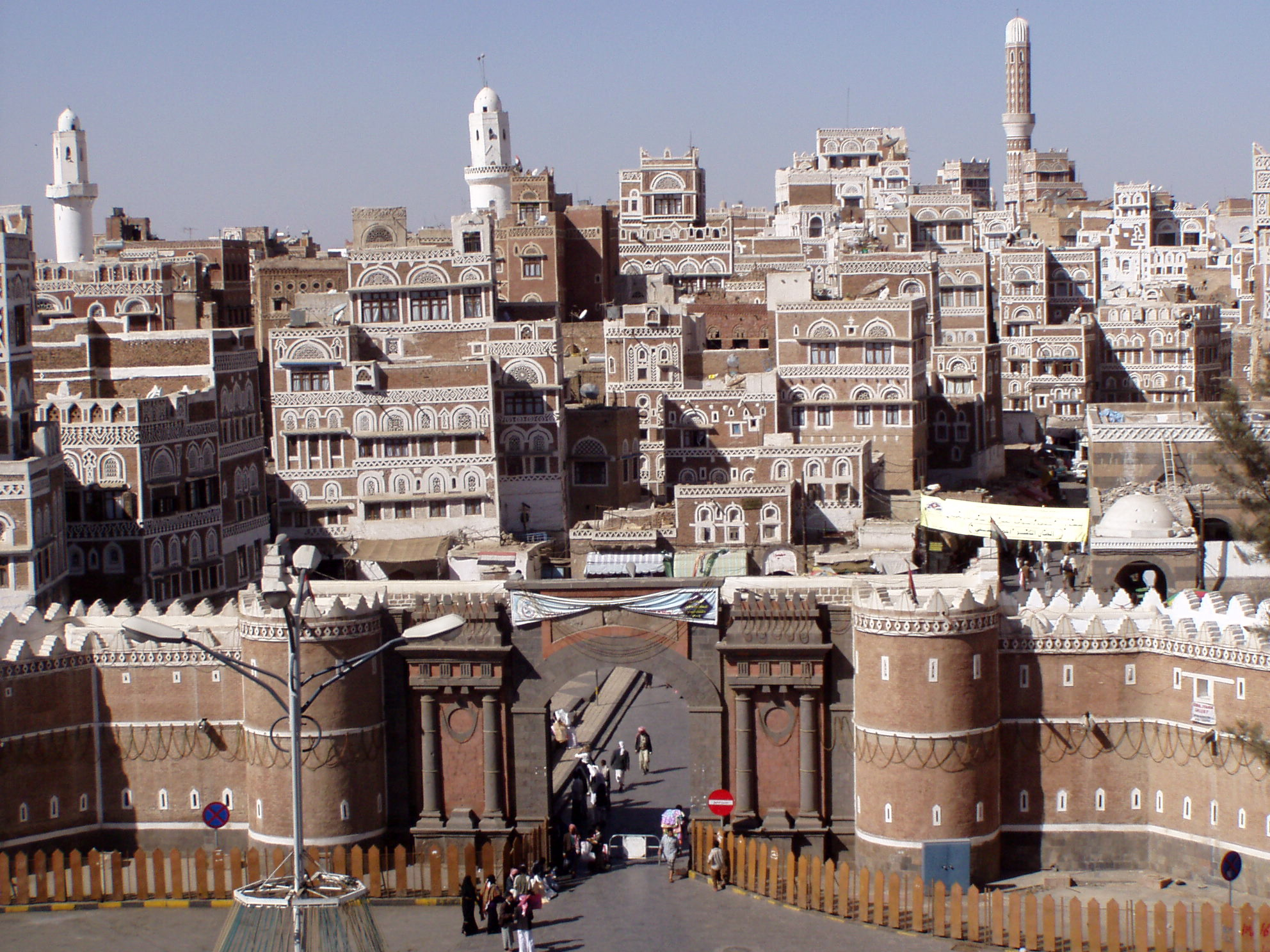
Old Town of Sana'a

- Old City of Sana'a, UNESCO World Heritage Site
- Old Walled City of Shibam, UNESCO World Heritage Site
- Zabīd, UNESCO World Heritage Site

=== Iran ===
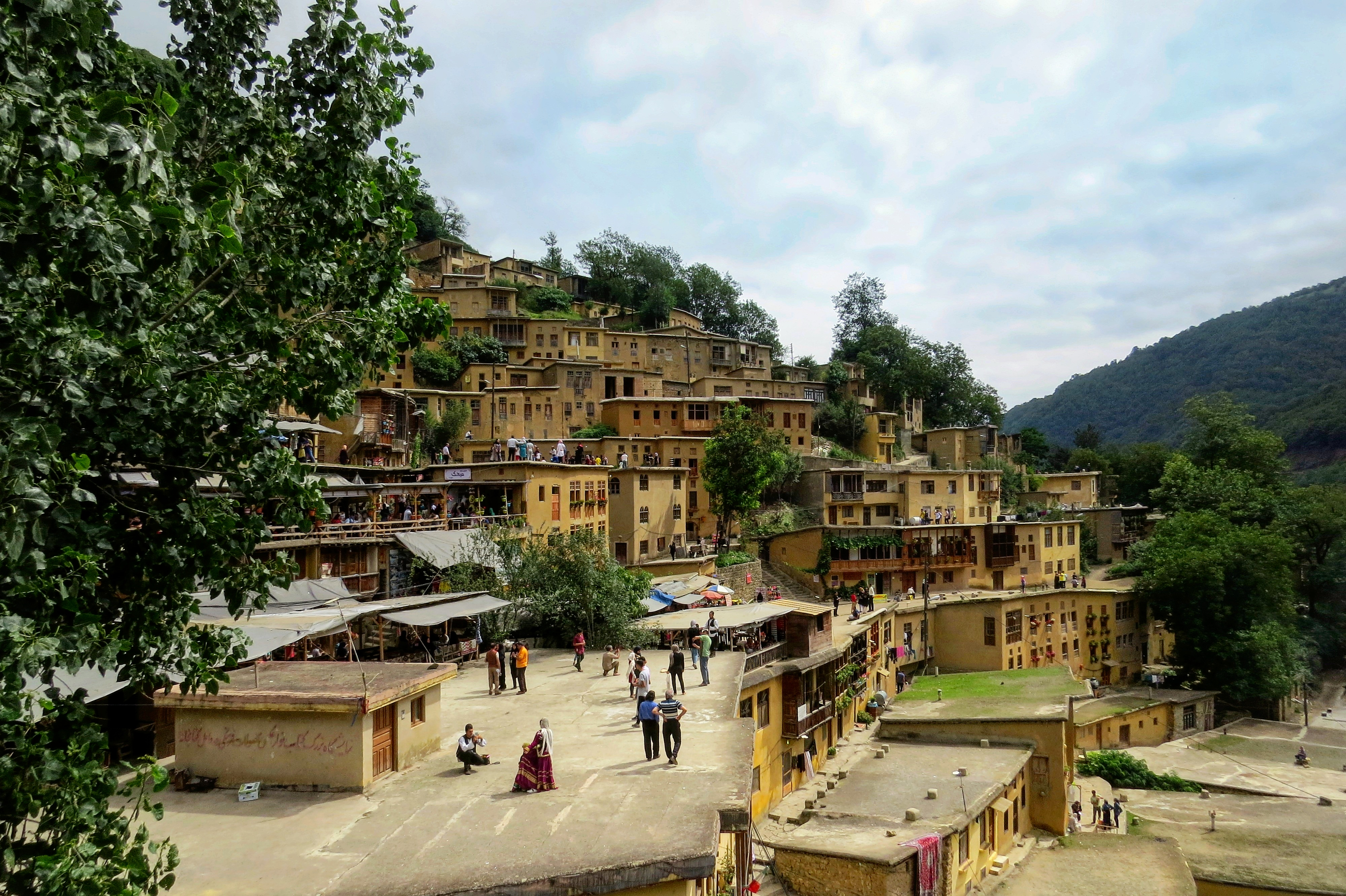
Overview of Masuleh

- Historical Center in Yazd, UNESCO World Heritage Site
- Historical Center in Isfahan, UNESCO World Heritage Site
- Historical City of Masuleh
- Historical City of Meybod
- Old Abyaneh

=== Iraq ===
- Erbil citadel, UNESCO World Heritage Site
- Old Mosul
- Old Baghdad
- Old Basra

== North America ==
=== Canada ===
==== Quebec ====
- Historic District of Old Quebec, Quebec, a UNESCO World Heritage Site
- Old Montreal, Quebec

==== Other ====
- Old Town Lunenburg, Nova Scotia, a UNESCO World Heritage Site
- Old Town, Toronto, Ontario
- Old Town Victoria

=== Cuba ===
- Old Havana, a UNESCO World heritage Site

=== Dominican Republic ===
- Ciudad Colonial in Santo Domingo, oldest European city in America, UNESCO World Heritage Site

=== Mexico ===
- Historic center of Mexico City, Mexico City, a UNESCO World Heritage Site
- Guanajuato City, Guanajuato, a UNESCO World Heritage Site
- Morelia, Michoacán, a UNESCO World Heritage Site
- Oaxaca City, Oaxaca, a UNESCO World Heritage Site
- Zacatecas City, Zacatecas, a UNESCO World Heritage Site
- Queretaro City, Querétaro
- Campeche City, Campeche, a UNESCO World Heritage Site
- Tlacotalpan, Veracruz, a UNESCO World Heritage Site
- San Miguel de Allende, Guanajuato, a UNESCO World Heritage Site

=== Panama ===
- Panamá Viejo, a UNESCO World Heritage Site

=== Puerto Rico ===
- Old San Juan, UNESCO World Heritage Site, U.S. National Register of Historic Places

=== United States ===
==== California ====
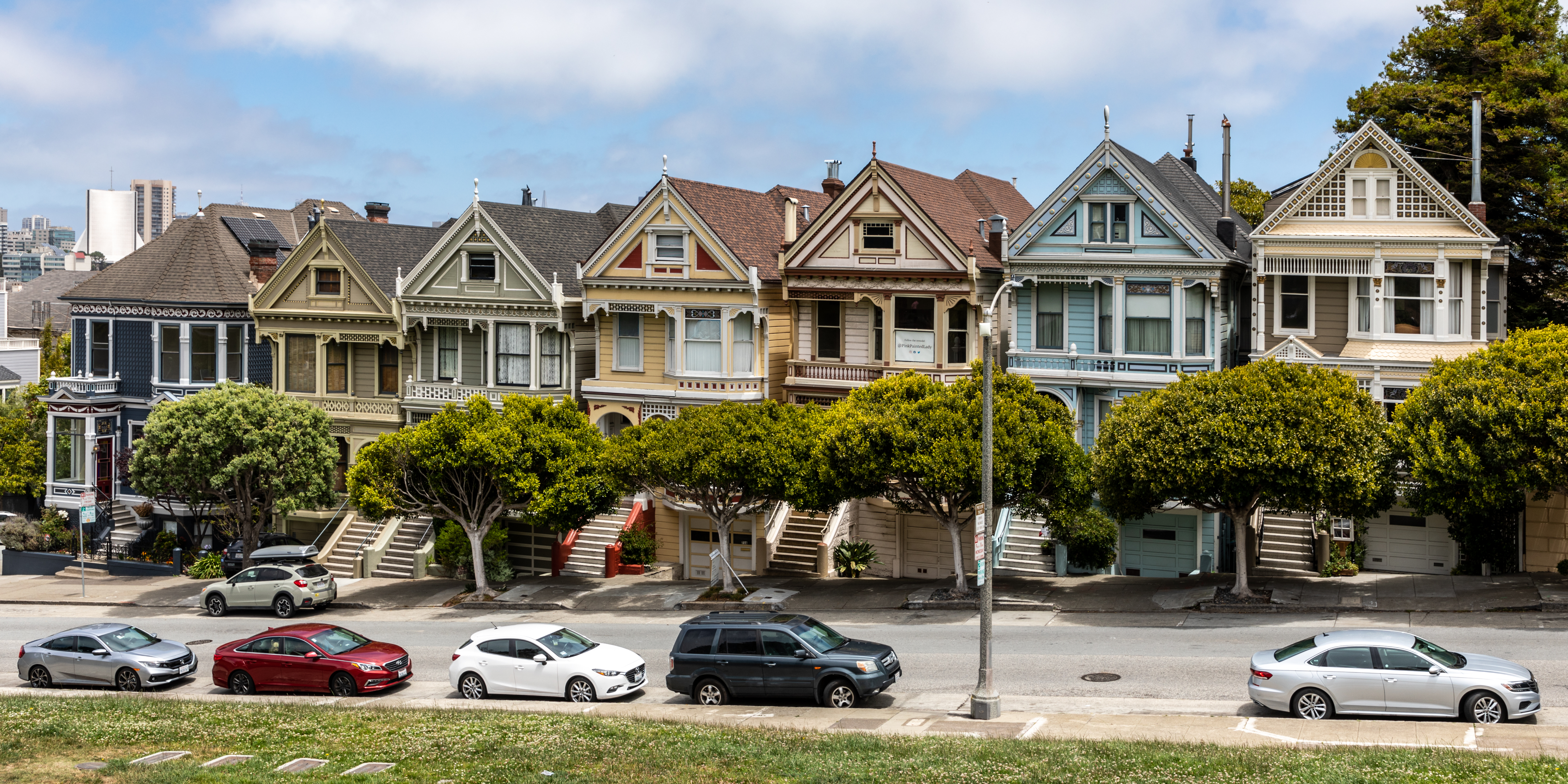
Painted Ladies in San Francisco

- Pueblo de Los Ángeles
- Old Town Eureka
- Historic Center of San Francisco
- Old Town Oakland
- Old Town Nevada City
- Old Solvang
- Old Ferndale
- Old Julian
- Old Town Pasadena
- Old Sacramento
- Old Town, San Diego and Old Town San Diego State Historic Park

==== Florida ====
- Old St. Augustine
- Old Town Fernandina
- Old Town, Key West

==== Maryland ====
- Historic center of Baltimore (Old West Baltimore, North Central Historic District), Maryland
- Old Annapolis, Maryland
- Olde Towne Gaithersburg, Maryland

==== New Mexico ====
- Old Town Albuquerque
- Old Town Taos
- Historic Center of Santa Fe
- Old Silver City

==== New York ====
- Historic center of New York, New York
- Old Town, Staten Island, New York

==== Northeastern United States ====
- Historic center of Boston (North End, Back Bay and Beacon Hill), Massachusetts
- Historic center of Philadelphia (Chestnut Hill, Old City), Pennsylvania
- Old Portsmouth, New Hampshire
- Old Burlington, Vermont
- Old New Haven, Connecticut
- Old Portland, Maine
- Old Town Jersey City, New Jersey
- Old Town Salem, Massachusetts
- New Castle, Delaware

==== North Carolina ====
- Old Town Beaufort
- Old Town Blowing Rock
- Old Town Asheville

==== Tennessee ====
- Old Town (Franklin, Tennessee) a location along the Natchez Trace named for the Mississippian mound complex there
- Old Town (Mississippian culture mound complex), Franklin, Tennessee
- Thomas Brown House (Franklin, Tennessee), also known as Old Town, NRHP-listed

==== Virginia ====
- Historic center of Richmond
- Old Town Fairfax
- Old Town Alexandria
- Old Town Manassas
- Portsmouth Olde Towne Historic District

==== Other US states ====
- Old Town Scottsdale, Arizona
- Old Town Fort Collins, Colorado
- Old Town, Augusta, Georgia
- Old Town, Chicago, Illinois
- Old Town, Indiana
- Old Town, Wichita, Kansas
- Old Town Lansing, Michigan
- Old Town Chinatown, Portland, Oregon
- Fairhaven, the oldest part of Bellingham, Washington

== South America ==
=== Argentina ===
- San Telmo and La Boca in Buenos Aires
- Old Salta
- Old Ushuaia

=== Brazil ===
==== Northeast ====
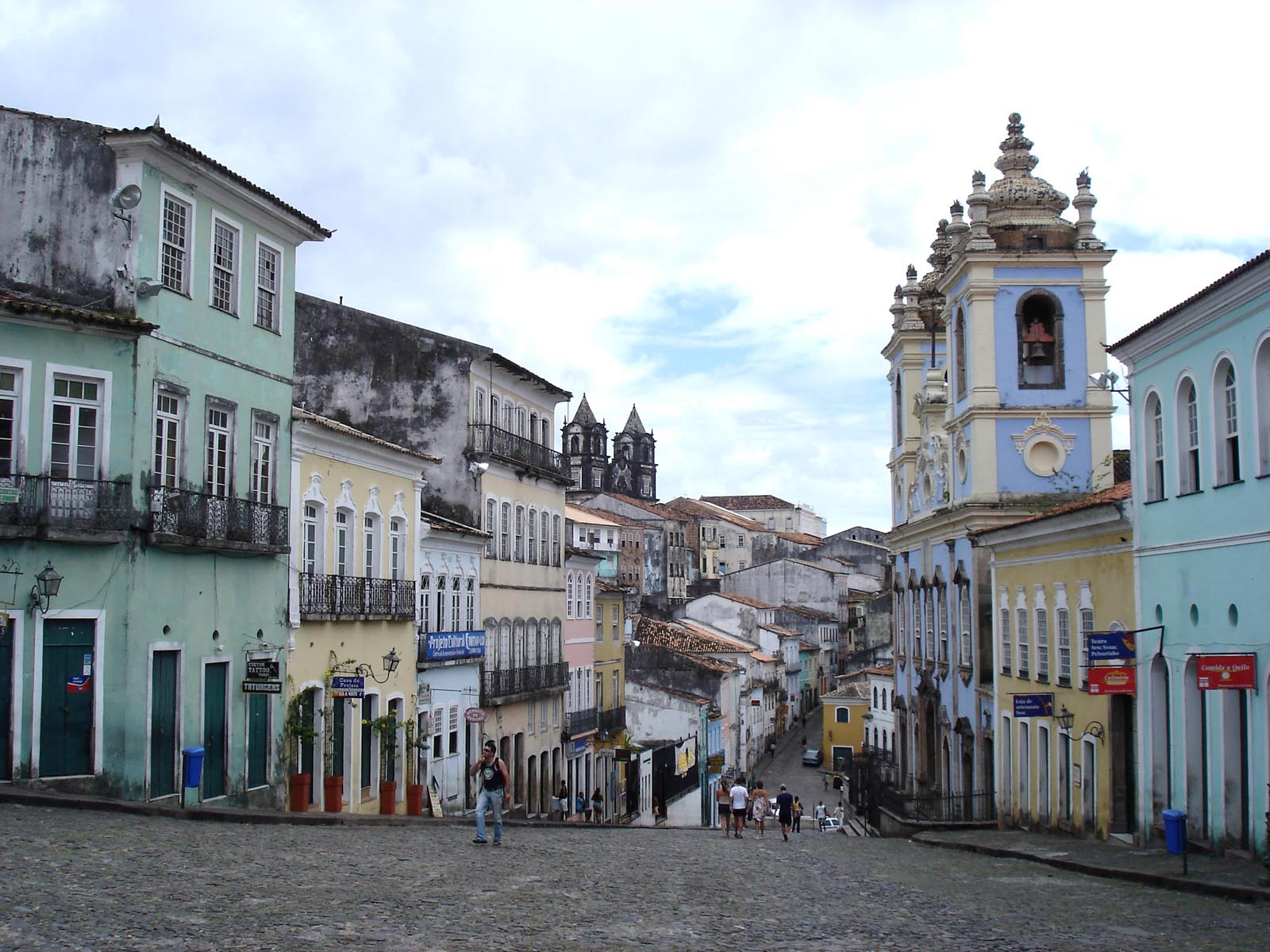
Historic center of Salvador

- Historic Center of Olinda, UNESCO World Heritage Site
- Historic Center of Salvador, also known as Pelourinho, UNESCO World Heritage Site
- Historic Center of São Luis, UNESCO World Heritage Site

==== Center-West ====
- Historic Center of Goiás, Goiás, UNESCO World Heritage Site

==== Southeast ====
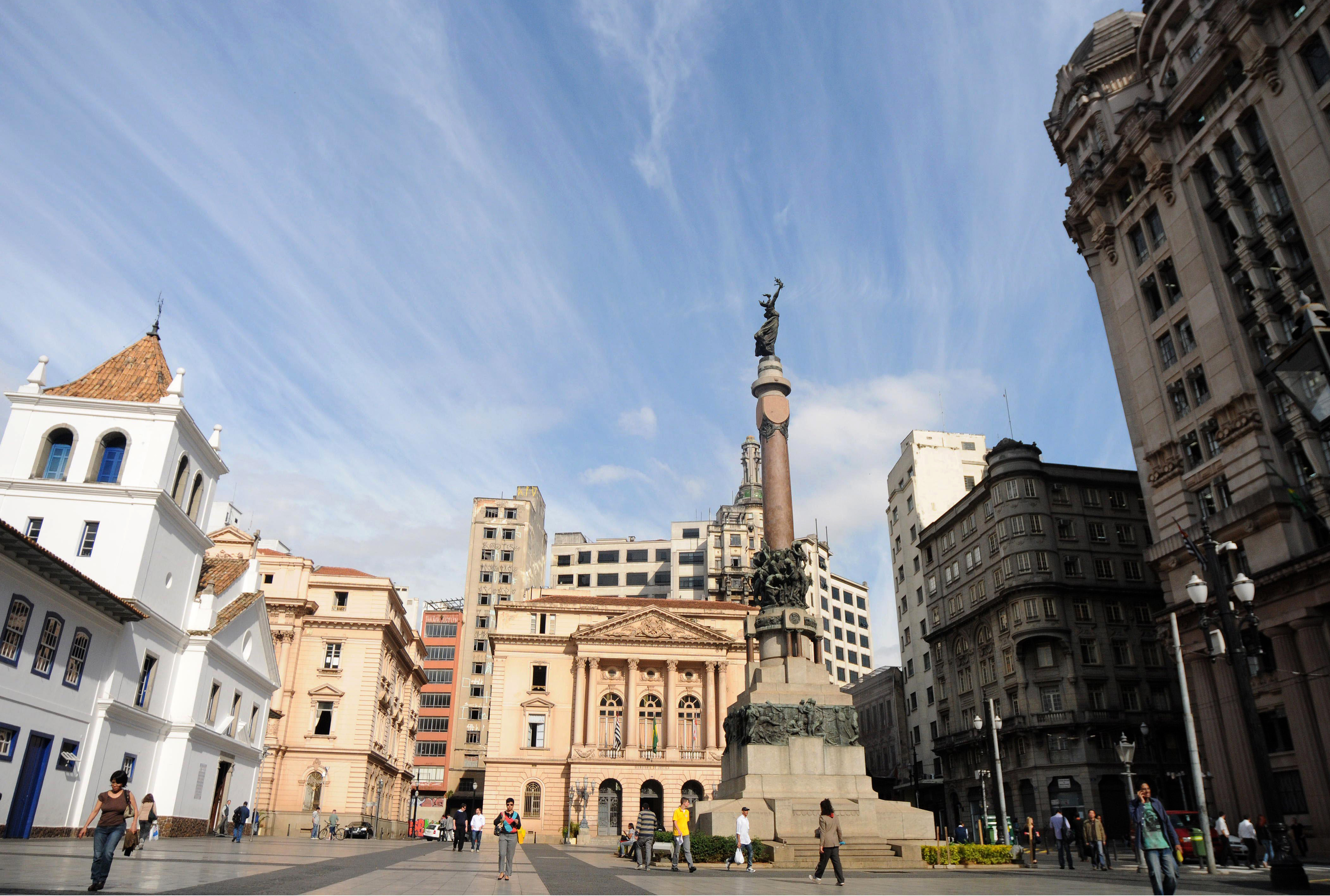
Pátio do Colégio (left) and surrounding historic buildings in São Paulo

- Historic Center of Diamantina, Minas Gerais, UNESCO World Heritage Site
- Centro, in Rio de Janeiro
- Sé, in the Central Zone of São Paulo

==== South ====
- Centro Histórico, in Porto Alegre

=== Colombia ===
- La Candelaria, a historic neighborhood in downtown Bogotá
- Old Cartagena, UNESCO World Heritage Site

=== Ecuador ===
- Quito's Historic Center, UNESCO World Heritage Site
- Santa Ana de los Ríos de Cuenca, UNESCO World Heritage Site

=== Uruguay ===
- Ciudad Vieja in Montevideo, "Old City" is the name of the oldest part of the city
- Colonia del Sacramento, UNESCO World Heritage Site

=== Venezuela ===
- Coro, UNESCO World Heritage Site

== Other uses ==
- The Girls of Old Town, a group of prostitutes in the comic series Sin City
- Old Town (song), a song by Phil Lynott, later covered by the Corrs

== See also ==
- Altstadt
- Eskişehir, "Old City" in Turkish
- Old City (disambiguation)
- Oldtown (disambiguation)
- Stare Miasto (disambiguation), "Old Town" in Polish
- Stari Grad (disambiguation), means "Old Town"
