= Gamla staden, Malmö =

Old Town of Malmö, Sweden

Gamla staden
- Neighbourhood
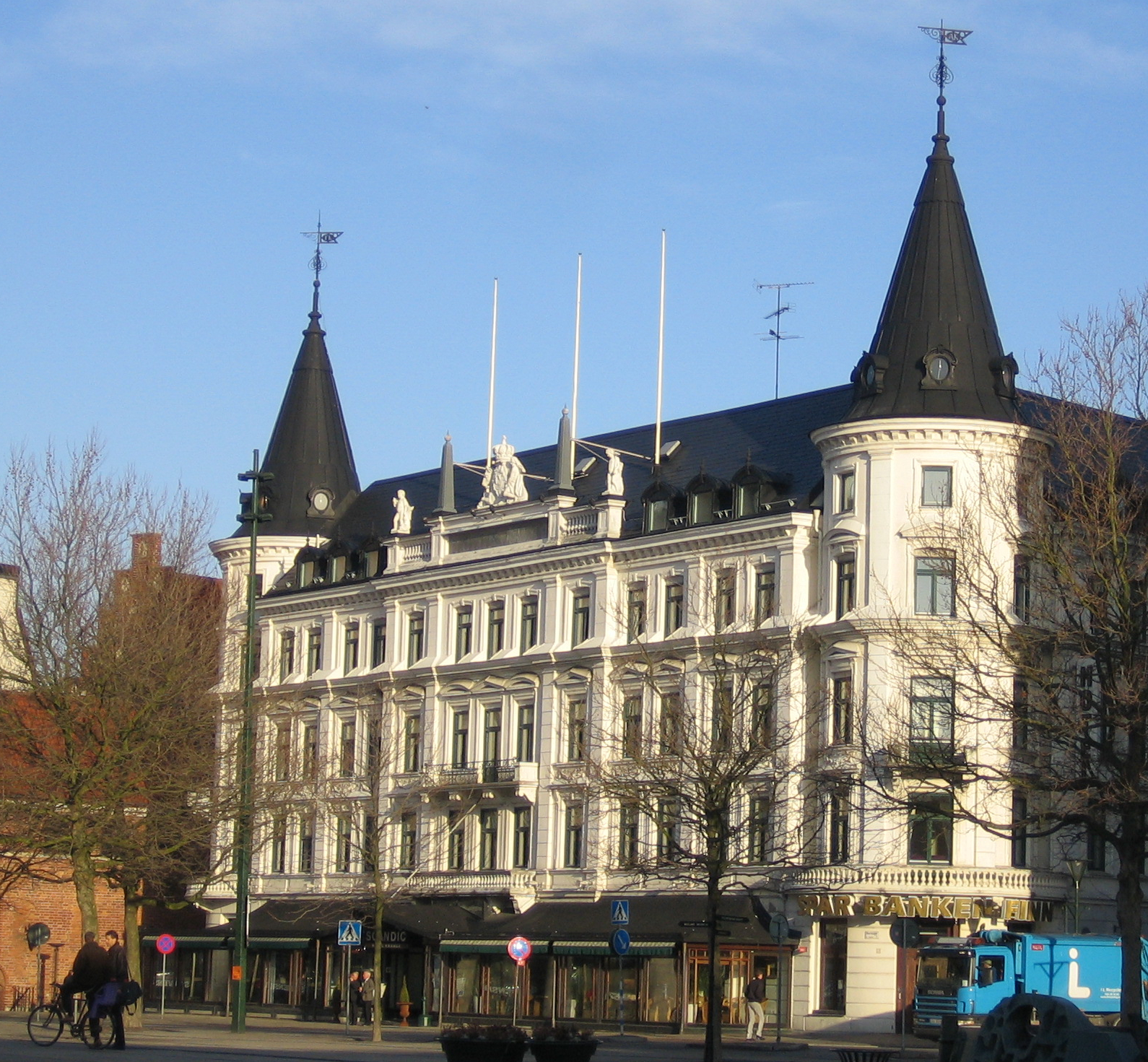
- Interactive map of Gamla staden
- Coordinates: 55°36′21″N 13°00′13″E
- Country: Sweden
- Province: Skåne
- County: Skåne County
- Municipality: Malmö Municipality
- Borough of Malmö: Centrum

Population (1 January 2011)
  - Total: 8,908
- Time zone: UTC+1 (CET)
  - Summer (DST): UTC+2 (CEST)

Gamla staden ("Old town") is a neighbourhood of Malmö, situated in the city district of Centrum, Malmö Municipality, Skåne County, Sweden.

The Old Town consists of Malmö's medieval city centre and the New Town, which was built in the early 19th century. The Old Town can be divided into two parts, West, a largely well-preserved area, and East, which was largely demolished in the 1960s. The area is bounded by the canals to the north, east and south and by Slottsgatan to the west. The buildings are mainly closed city blocks of varying number of floors and varying age. Quite a few are offices, restaurants and shops. The dwellings are predominantly privately owned apartment buildings.

The Old Town has four squares, Stortorget, Lilla torg, Drottningtorget and Gustav Adolfs torg and two shopping centers, Hansacompagniet and Caroli city.

There are many historic buildings in the Old Town, such as Rosenvingeska House, the Tunnel, Thottska House, Diedenska House, Niels Kuntze's House, the Town Hall, the Company House, The Governor's Residence, Jørgen Kock's House, The Hedman Farm, The Faxe House and Flensburg House.

There are two churches in the old town: St. Peter's Church and Caroli Church. There are also two schools: Västra skolan and Österportsskolan.

== Malmö's medieval city center ==
Malmö emerged as a city in the 1250s. The oldest urban settlement started from the castle Flynderborg which was built in the area of Norra Vallgatan - Hamngatan. Until the 19th century, Öresund went all the way up to the current Norra Vallgatan. Adelgatan and parts of Östergatan became the important square street in the oldest Malmö. When the city was founded, a church dedicated to St. Nicolaus was built on the site of the current St. Peter's Church. This was replaced in the early 14th century by the current church. By the end of the 13th century, the city grew along the main street "den lange Adelgade", i.e. the current Västergatan, Adelgatan and Östergatan. During the 14th century, the city gradually grew southwards to the current Skomakaregatan - Baltzarsgatan. During the 15th century, further land was incorporated to the south and Söderport was then located at the current Södergatan's mouth in Gustav Adolf's square. The city was thus still far inside the current canal.

== The new city ==
Following the destruction of the fortifications around the medieval city center in the early 19th century, a new district was built, originally called the 'New Town'. Designed by fortification engineer Nils Mannerkrantz, the city plan took the form of a grid city with straight streets and rectangular blocks, clearly distinguishing it from the more irregularly shaped medieval quarters. Among other things, Stora Nygatan was extended and the city gained two new squares, Gustav Adolfs torg and Drottningtorget. With the construction of the New Town, Malmö grew geographically and at the same time began a population increase. The New Town is now part of the part of Malmö known as the Old Town.

With the demolition of the fortifications, the old 13th century Grönegatan route in the eastern part of the Old Town was extended. The new route was named Nya Grönegatan and by the end of the first decade of the 19th century new streets such as Norregatan, Stora Trädgårdsgatan and Stora Kvarngatan had been added. Previously, the city had "ended" where Grönegatan now begins at the Humlegatan-Grönegatan intersection. Around the same time, smaller streets and alleys such as Lilla Kvarngatan, Lilla Trädgårdsgatan, Österportsgatan, Vallagränd and Norregränd were planned. Nya Grönegatan was renamed Grönegatan in 1945 and the entire stretch from Kattsundsgatan to Östra Promenaden was called Grönegatan. Today the oldest part, which ran between Kattsundsgatan and Humlegatan, has been demolished to make way for Caroli City.

== Some blocks in the Old Town ==
- Kv. 12 Möllebacken: The Möllebacken block was bounded by Stora Kvarngatan, Norregatan, Grönegatan and Stora Trädgårdsgatan and was named after the embankment on which the former post mill Vallamöllan had stood until 1853. Vallagränd extended into the block, but this was included in the block area from 1980.
