= Jörgen Kocks hus =

Historical building in Malmö, Sweden

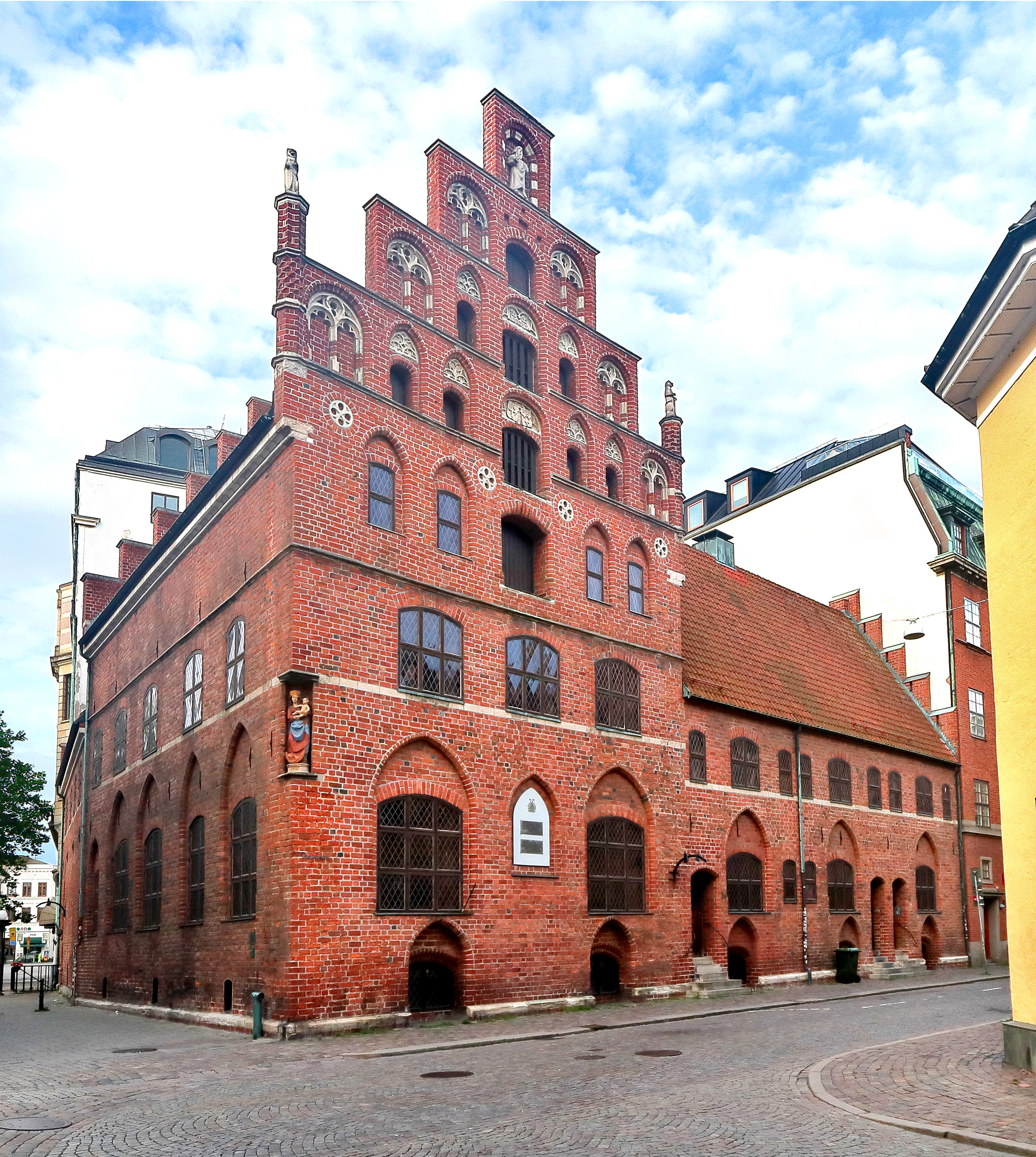
- North facade with stepped gable - east facade also visible
- Interactive map of the Jörgen Kocks hus area

General information
- Architectural style: Brick Gothic; Brick Renaissance; Dutch Renaissance
- Location: Västergatan 2a, Malmö
- Coordinates: 55°36′24.34″N 12°59′55.61″E
- Year built: 1522 - 1525

Jörgen Kocks hus (Jörgen Kock's House), or Kockska Huset, is a historic building complex in Malmö, Sweden. Its brick walls symbolize not only Malmö's history in the 1500s, but also a significant part of Danish history (Malmö belonged to Denmark until 1658). It was built by the wealthy businessman Jörgen Kock for his family and his mint. Malmö has the greatest number of preserved 16th-century brick buildings in the Nordic region and the finest example is Jörgen Kock’s estate. It has been a listed building since 1993. Today it is used as a restaurant and is also hosting conferences.

== History ==
During the first half of the 16th century, mayors and prominent members of the bourgeoisie erected magnificent buildings in Malmö. These buildings symbolize the emerging bourgeoisie’s quest to establish an economic and political foothold in the society of that time and are rare in Scandinavia.

Jörgen Kock's estate is named after its founder, Jörgen Kock, who was master of the mint for all of Denmark and mayor of Malmö. In 1522, he purchased a property in the heart of Malmö from Sorø Abbey. The buildings were constructed at his request between 1522 and 1525.

The location of Jörgen Kock's property and his houses used to be of great commercial importance in Malmö. It was once the intersection of the main street and the street leading down to the moored ships in the harbor.

In 1444, Denmark’s coin minting operations were relocated to Malmö. Jörgen Kock is mentioned as the master of the mint for all of Denmark in 1518, when he became King Christian II’s master of the mint. In 1526 production was moved to Jörgen Kock's estate.

In August 1524, Gustav Vasa, the Swedish king, stayed for a week in the house during the Treaty of Malmö.

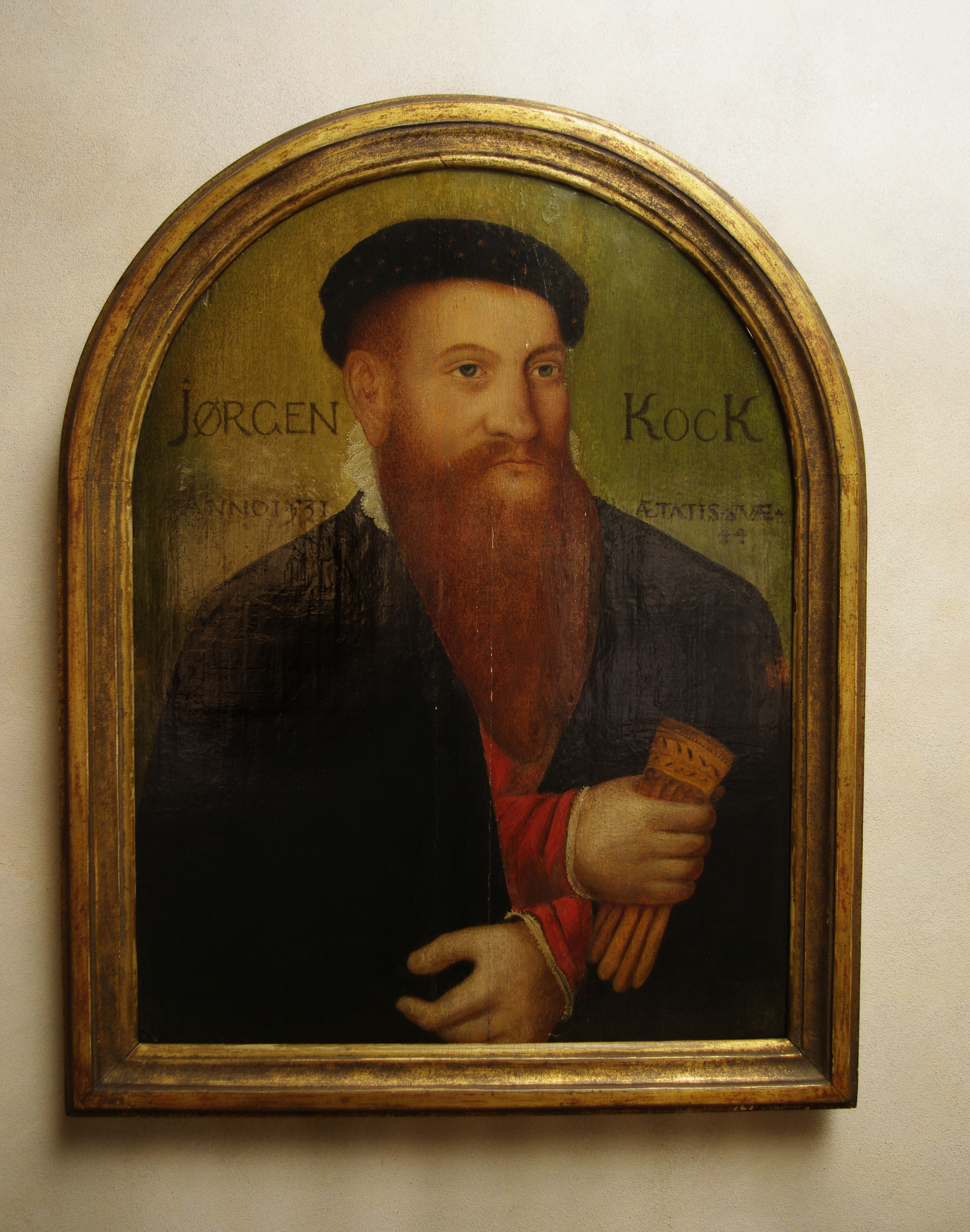
Portrait of Mayor Jörgen Kock, 1531

=== The preserved parts of the buildings ===
Today, three buildings remain from the former estate. Jörgen and his wife Citze Kortzdatter van Nuland lived in the stately corner building. Attached to it is the smaller wing facing Stortorget. Jörgen’s bank office was located on the ground floor here, and his private banquet hall was on the upper floor. The wing along the Västergatan street was originally built as a two-story row house, a rental building with three apartments. The eastern apartment, adjacent to the corner house, was part of Jörgen’s private residence. All of the buildings have cross-vaulted cellars.

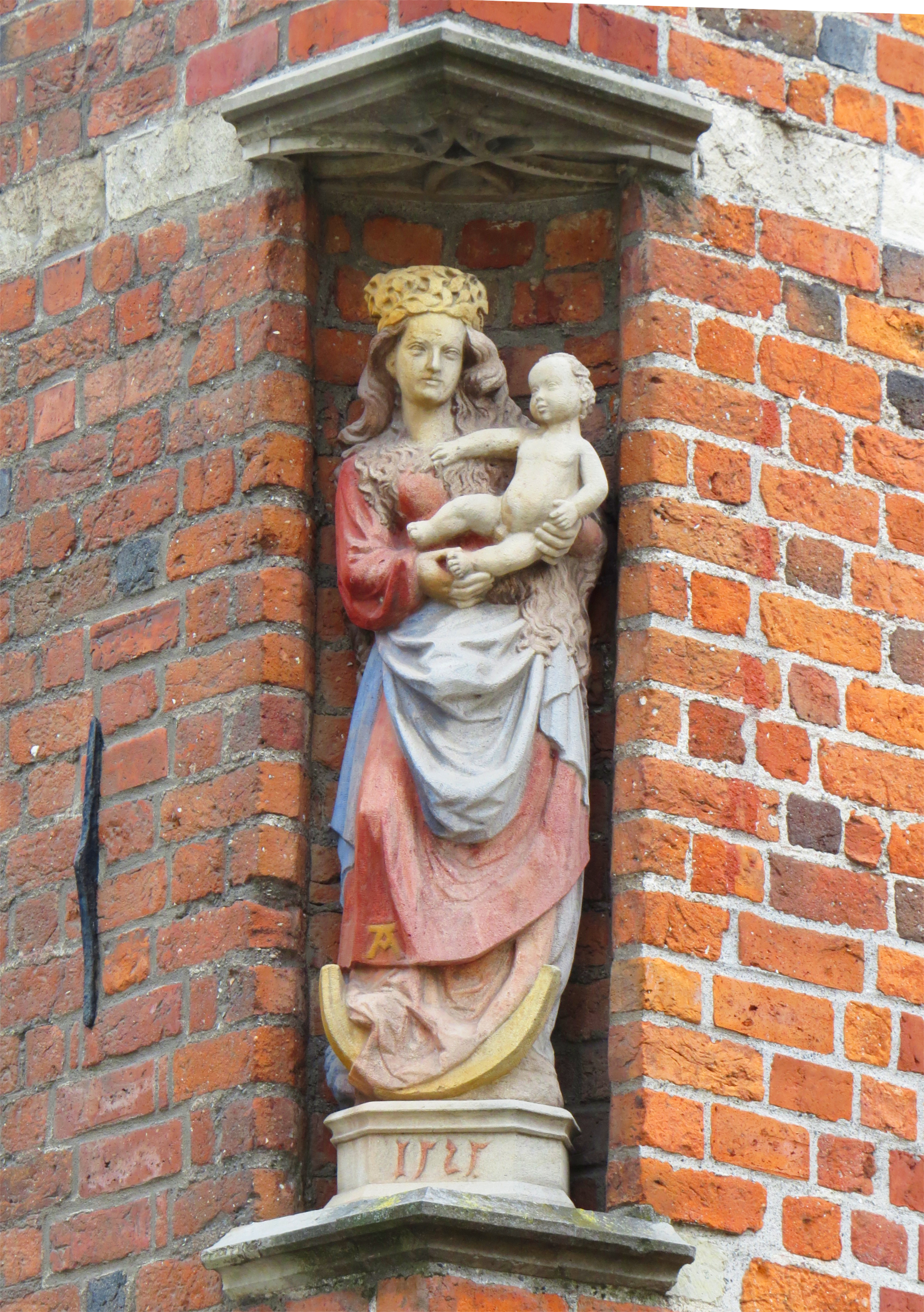
The Madonna sculpture on the facade

The corner building boasts a wealth of decorative details, though most of them are now replicas due to air pollution. The originals are preserved at the Malmö Museum. In the corner, the Virgin Mary is depicted standing on a crescent moon, holding the infant Jesus. The pedestal is dated 1525. The same year is inscribed above one of the attic hatches. Above another hatch are the coats of arms of Jörgen and Citze. Similar coats of arms are found on the two lions standing on both sides of the gable.

On the upper floor, the original murals in the former bedroom are still partially preserved. That is also true of the murals in the Stortorget wing.

=== New owners ===
After Jörgen Kock’s death in 1556, the estate came to be owned by several different noble families. As the years have passed and the owners have changed, the estate’s buildings have been adapted to new uses and new stylistic ideals.

In 1770, the merchant Frans Suell purchased the estate and made it his home. Frans Suell would go on to become one of Sweden’s wealthiest citizens. On his large property, he had a tobacco factory built. In 1774, he also began construction of the Port of Malmö, and he was one of the initiators behind the establishment of a major bank in Malmö.

After Suell’s death, the estate passed into the ownership of his son-in-law, Lorens Kockum, and in 1825 was inherited by his son, Frans Henrik Kockum. Frans Henrik went on to become a major industrial magnate in Malmö; among other things, he founded Kockums (Kockums' Mechanical Workshop and Shipyard). This historical connection to the etate led Kockums to purchase Jörgen Kock’s old estate in the 1960s and to fund the extensive renovation and remodeling of the estate that was carried out at that time.

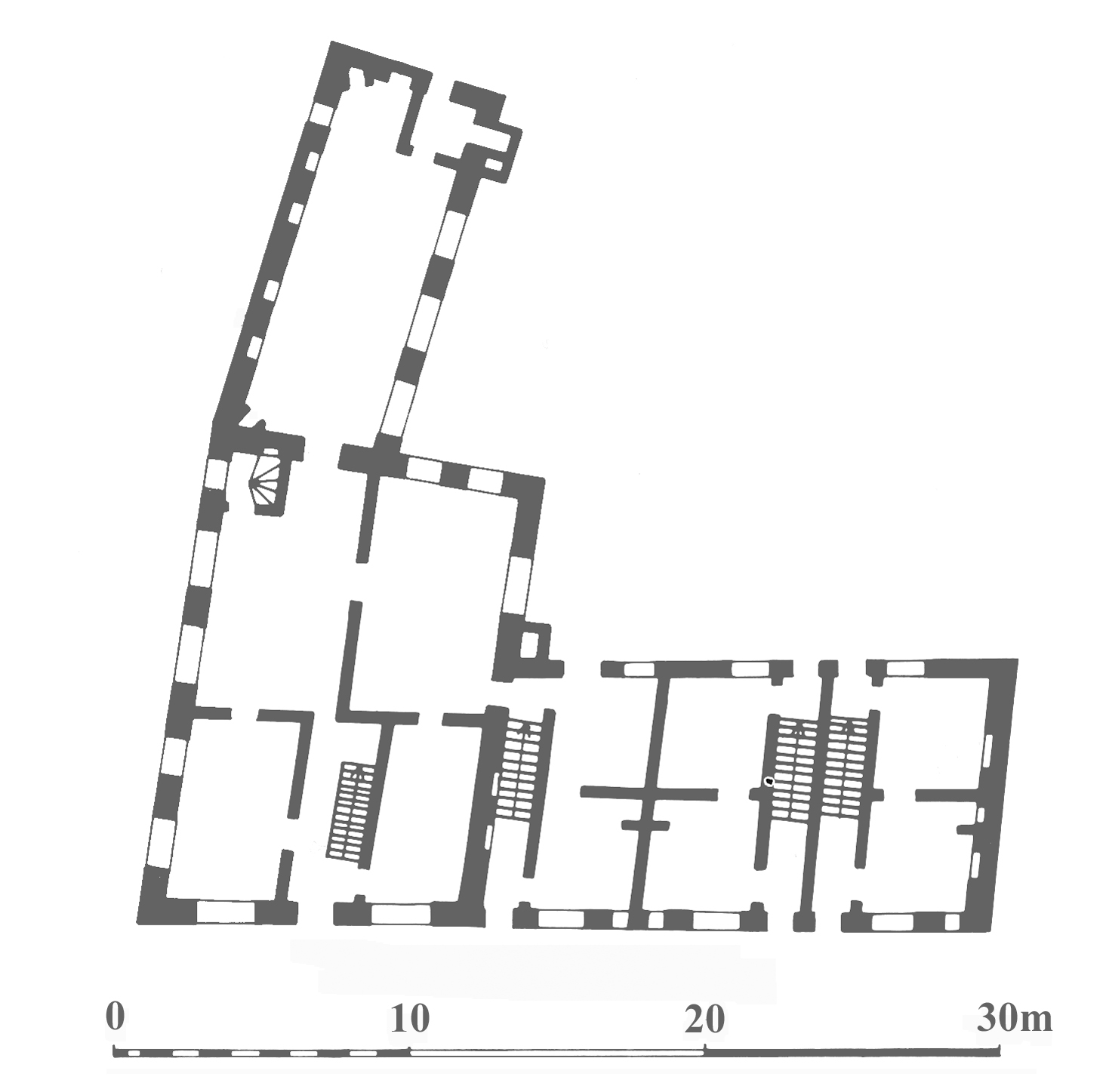
Ground floor of Jörgen Kock's original estate (Reconstruction: Sven Rosborn, 1978)

== Architecture ==
The estate, with its brick buildings, reflects medieval architectural traditions but also exhibits Renaissance influences from the Netherlands. The elaborately decorated gable of the corner house has no counterpart among the surviving buildings in the other Nordic countries. Architectural experts believe the gable was modeled after the architectural style of northern Europe at that time.

All facade elements were constructed from bricks fired at Kock’s own brickworks and were left unplastered; however, they are said to have been painted with Venetian red lime paint originally. To provide a color contrast, niches and small recessed areas were whitewashed.

The roofs are tiled gable roofs; at the junctions and corners, stepped decorative gables have been added as dividing ornamental elements. (Records from other locations in the late Middle Ages indicate that the number of steps on the gables facing outward represented the wealth of the builder—the more steps, the richer the builder.)

== Gallery ==
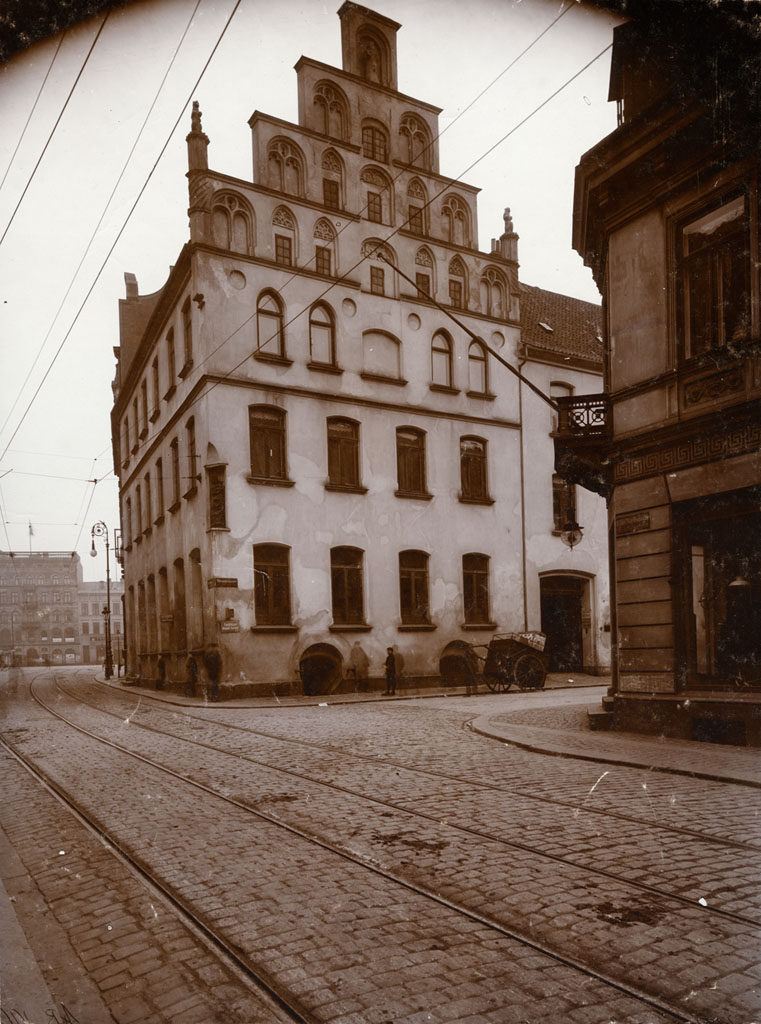
Jörgen Kocks hus, 1910

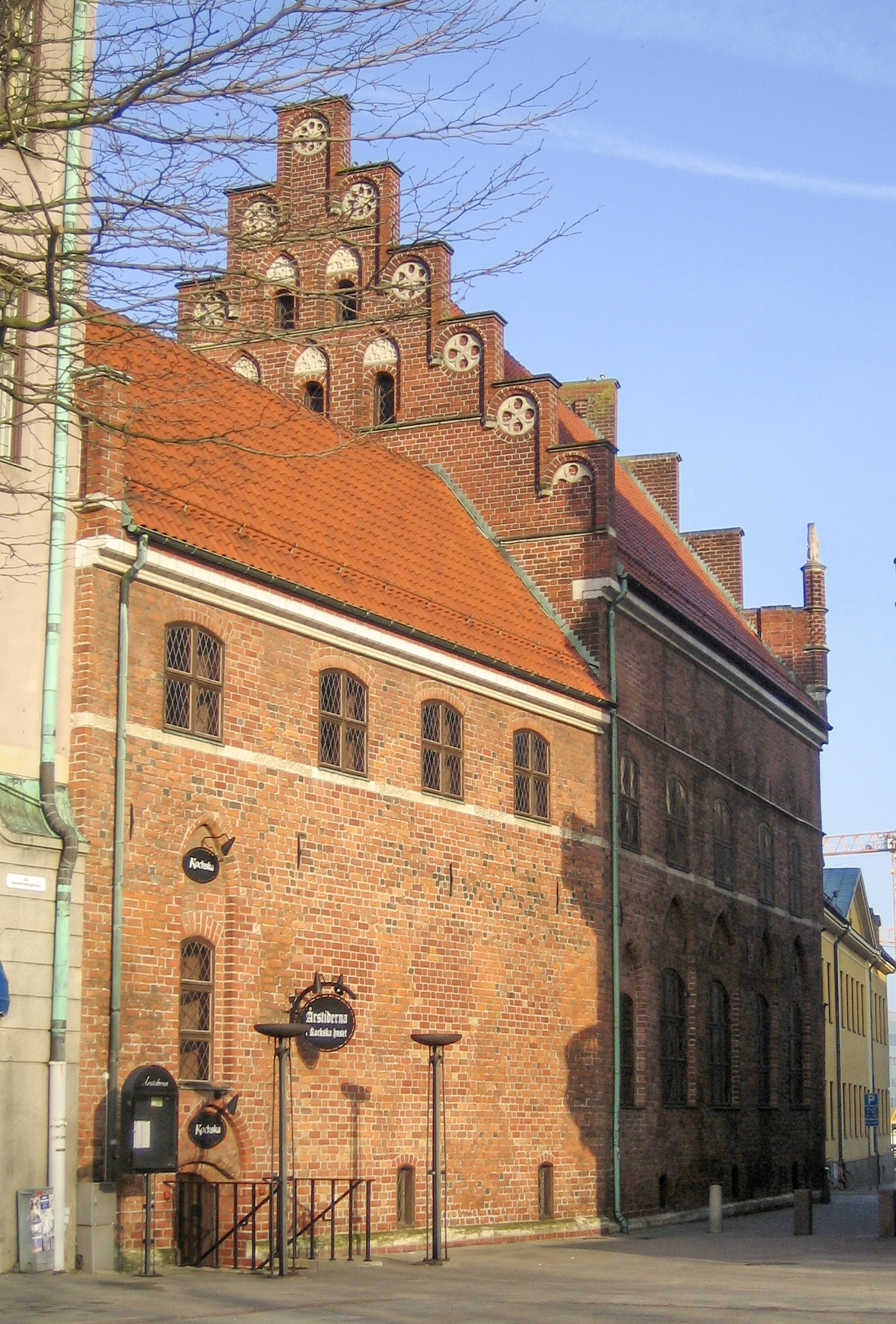
East facade

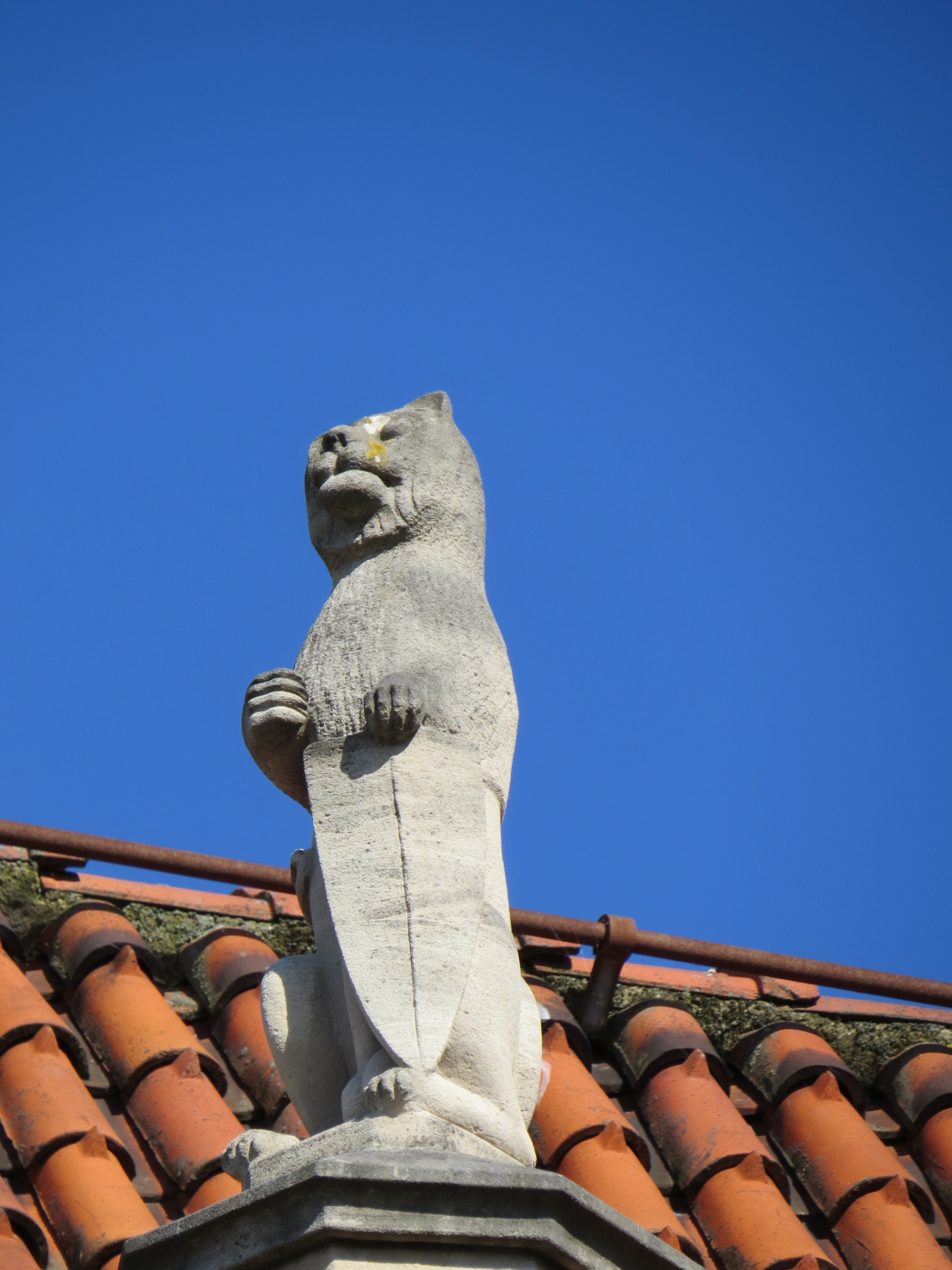
One of the two statues from atop the north gable - a lion with a coat of arms

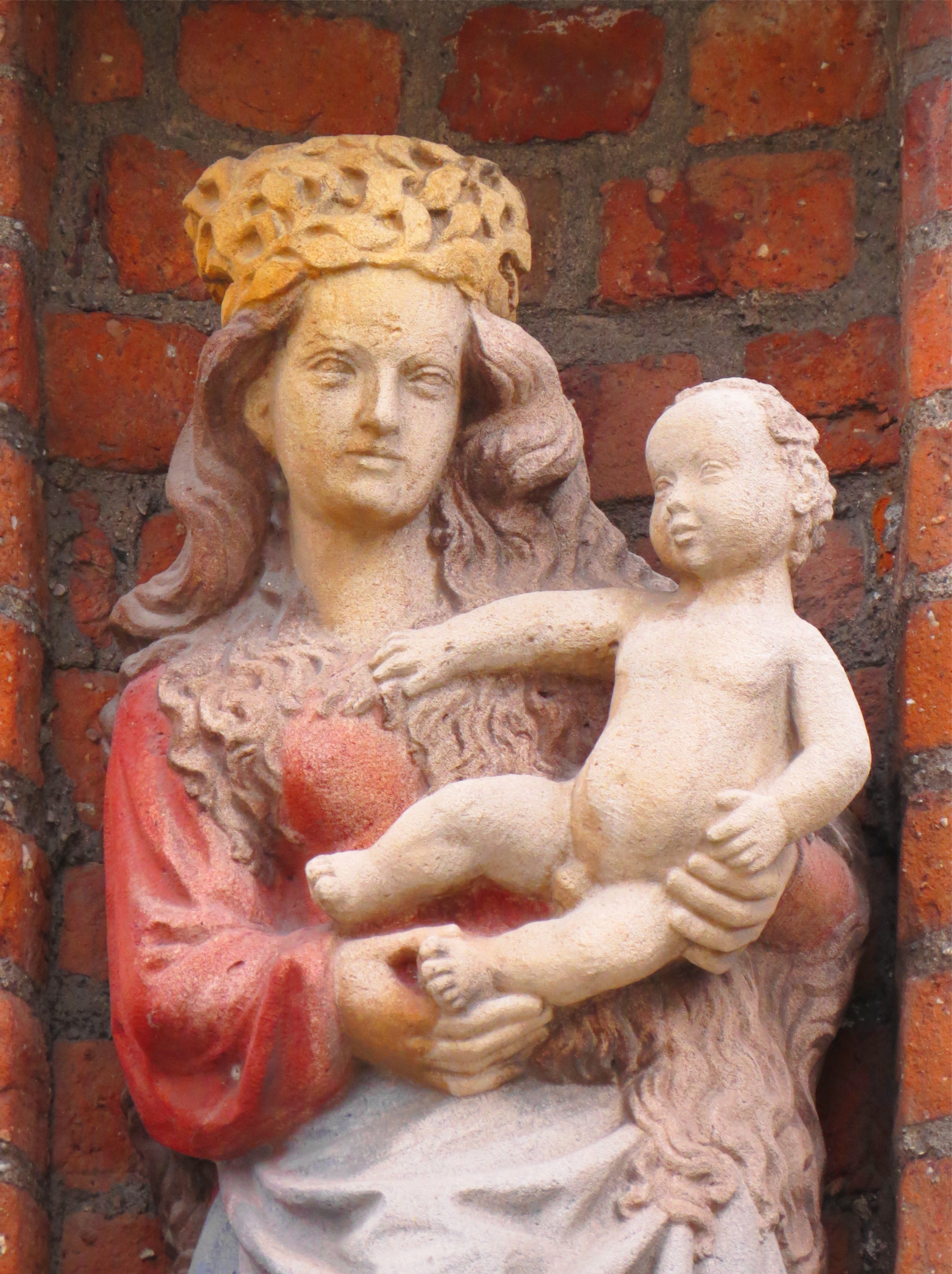
The Virgin Mary with the Infant Jesus, detail
