= St. Peter's Church, Malmö =

Church in Malmö, Sweden

St. Peter's Church
- S:t Petri kyrka
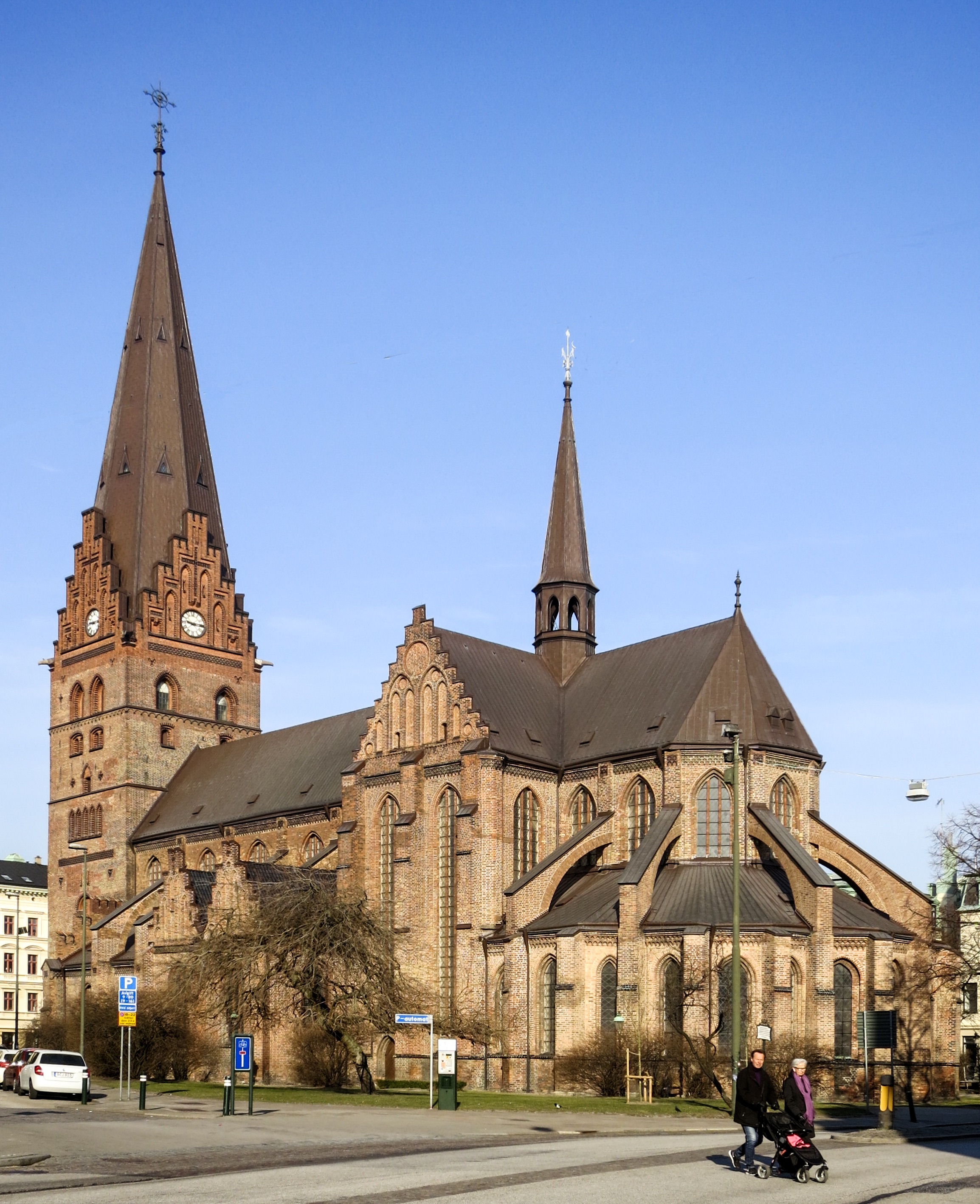
- St. Peter's Church (2015)
- St. Peter's Church
- 55°36′25″N 13°00′13″E
- Location: Gamla staden, Malmö, Malmö
- Country: Sweden
- Denomination: Lutheran, Church of Sweden
- Previous denomination: Roman Catholic
- Website: Website of the Church

History
- Consecrated: 1319

Architecture
- Style: Brick Gothic
- Completed: 1380

Administration
- Diocese: Diocese of Lund
- Parish: St. Peter's Parish, Malmö

Clergy
- Vicar: Ewa-Sofia Gudmundsson

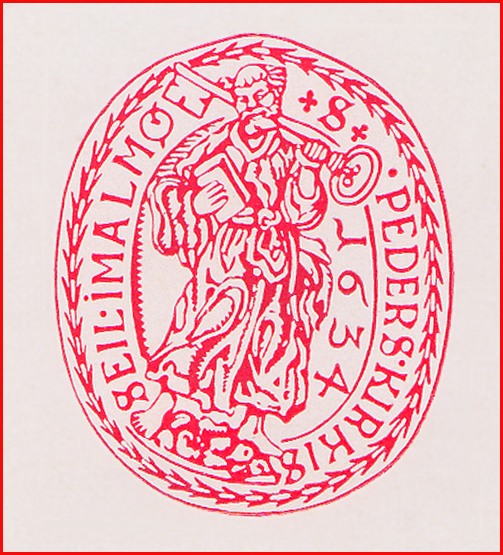
St. Peter's Church seal.

Saint Peter's Church (Swedish: Sankt Petri kyrka) is a Brick Gothic church in Malmö, Sweden. Built in the 14th century as the main church of the city, it has been described as "the main Gothic monument within church architecture in Scania". The church was a spiritual centre during the Reformation, and was one of only a few churches in what was at the time medieval Denmark that suffered damage due to iconoclasm as a consequence of the Reformation. St. Peter's Church contains late medieval murals of recognized high quality, as well as a number of unusual furnishings. The altarpiece, made in 1611, is one of the largest in the Nordic countries. The church is built as a basilica with three naves and transepts. The church is actually dedicated to two saints, St. Peter and St. Paul, Ecclesia beatorum Petri et Pauli apostolorum.

== History ==
=== Historical background ===
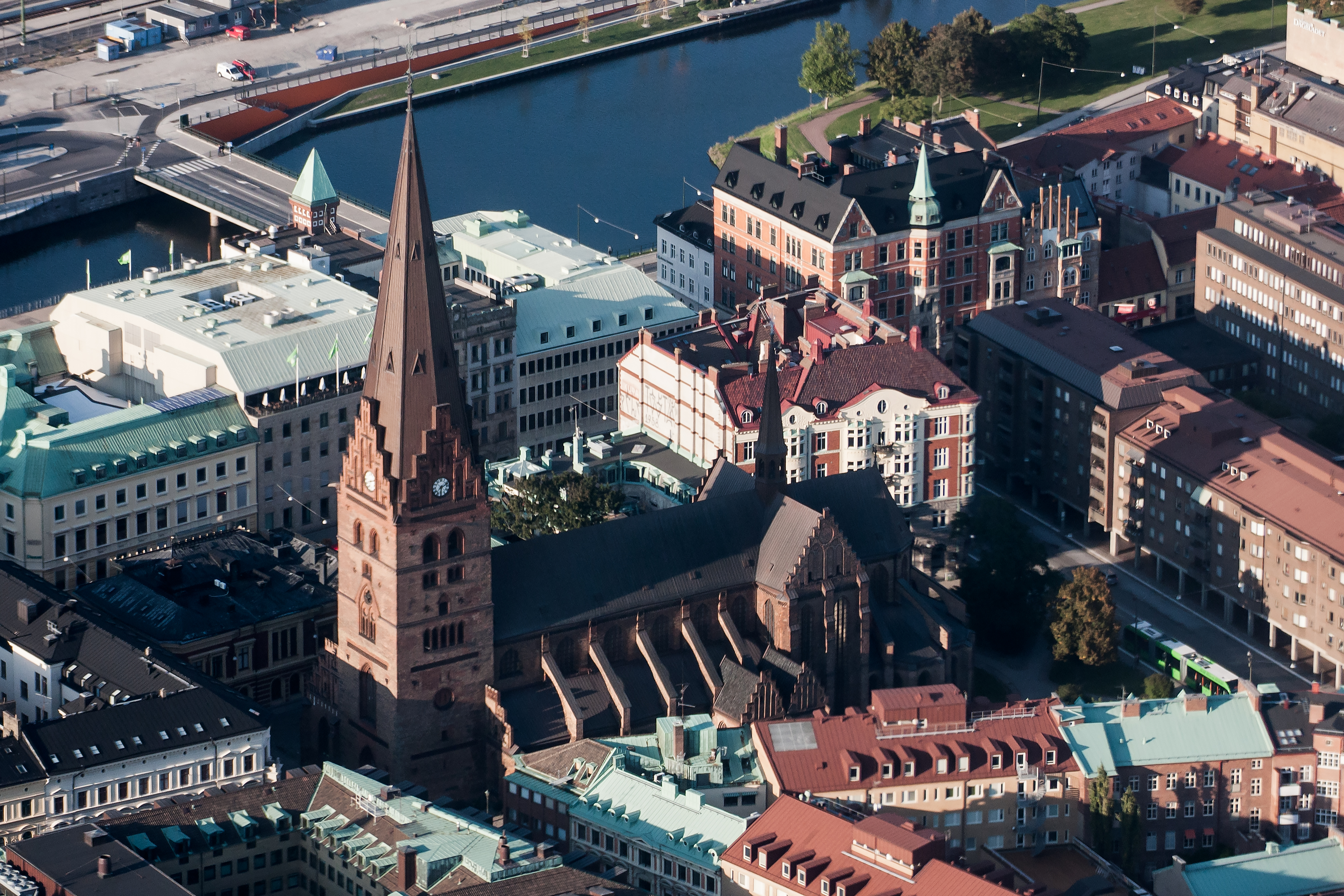
Aerial view of the church within its urban context

St. Peter's Church is Malmö's oldest church, oldest preserved building and originally the only parish church. It is characteristic for the younger medieval cities of Scania, such as Malmö, to only have one original parish church; nearby Lund, an older settlement, in contrast had a high concentration of churches early on. The explanation is probably that Malmö rose to significance at a time when the land was already subdivided into parishes following the Christianization of Scandinavia in the preceding centuries. Malmö began a rapid expansion thanks to the lucrative trade in herring around 1200 and the city was part of the economic infrastructure around the Hanseatic League and the Scania Market. By the end of the Middle Ages the city had established itself as the most important commercial city in the province. St. Peter's Church has been described as "the main Gothic monument within church architecture in Scania" and as a "very good and strongly authentic representative of Baltic Brick Gothic". During the 14th century, St. Peter's Church was the largest town church in Denmark. (Note: The province of Scania, including Malmö, did not become a part of Sweden until 1658, following the Treaty of Roskilde.) It is part of an urban structure with a still largely intact medieval street layout.

The church played an important role as a spiritual centre during the Reformation, with the Reformer Claus Mortensen active as a priest in the church. One of only four occurrences of violence due to iconoclasm during the Danish Reformation occurred in St. Peter's Church in 1529, when Claus Mortensen led the destruction of much of the ornamentation in the church, deemed "too Catholic" by the Reformer. Of the more than sixty pre-Reformation altarpieces, only one survived more or less intact. It was also following the Reformation (in 1555) that the interior of the church was whitewashed.

=== Construction ===
A small Romanesque brick church, first mentioned in 1269, once stood on the site. This was probably dedicated to St. Nicholas, the saint of seafarers. At the same time as Copenhagen got its Church of Our Lady (Vor Frue Kirke), probably consecrated in 1316, an identical church was started in Malmö. The Malmö church was dedicated to saints Peter and Paul and probably inaugurated in 1319. Construction may have been finished by 1349, or at least long before 1380. The church is an example of Brick Gothic architecture found around the Baltic Sea, arguably most well-represented in the Marienkirche in Lübeck, which was also likely used as a direct model when building St. Peter's Church. It also displays certain influences from contemporary French Gothic architecture. The church was constructed with red bricks and was built as a Gothic basilica with a western church tower and a transept that connects to the ambulatory of the pentagonal chancel.

=== Later alterations ===
The church has been altered several times since its construction. The original church tower collapsed in 1420, prompting the construction of a new tower and new vaults supporting the ceiling in the western part of the building. Already in 1442, the tower again suffered a partial collapse and had to be rebuilt. It was rebuilt again as late as 1890, when it attained its present appearance after a renovation. The tower is 98 metres (322 ft) tall. Five side chapels were erected during the late 15th century and the early 16th century, of which three survive to this day. Two of them are named after the saints Anne and Mary, respectively. The third was dedicated to Saint George but is popularly called "The Merchants' chapel" (Krämarkapellet) and was built for Malmö's guild of cloth dealers but used by several of the city's guilds whose coats of arms can still be seen in the chapel. The church porch was also built some time after 1420.

A substantial reconstruction of the church was made in 1847–1853 under the guidance of Carl Georg Brunius. The church was at the time in an unarguably bad condition but Brunius' renovation has nonetheless been criticized for having been harsh. The church was given an entirely new copper roof, and large parts of the walls were replaced with new bricks. A large part of the ambulatory was entirely dismantled and rebuilt, and nearly all the buttresses of the church were heavily reconstructed. The floor of the whole church was covered with old gravestones. These were taken up and most were smashed. The whitewashed interior was renewed, and many of the church's Renaissance furnishings were removed; the altarpiece and organ facade were saved contrary to the wishes of Brunius, but the altarpiece was painted grey.

Between 1904 and 1906, cathedral architect Theodor Wåhlin tried to restore what had escaped destruction fifty years earlier. During this time, the altarpiece was restored to its earlier vibrant colours and the murals in The Merchants' chapel uncovered and restored.

Smaller renovations and alterations have also been made during the 20th century. The chapel originally dedicated to Saint Anne was rebuilt in 1964. Between 1965 and 1967 the interior of the church was renovated, and the murals in The Merchants' chapel carefully restored. Additional restorations of the murals were made in 1999. In the 1980s, bathrooms, a cloakroom and an information desk were installed in the church. In 2011, another major restoration of the interior of the church was carried out.

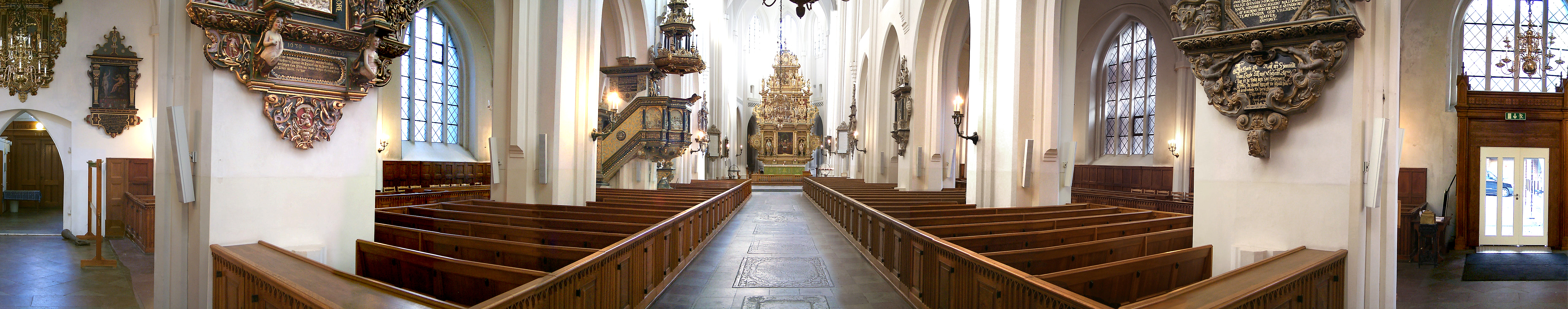
View of the interior from the entrance

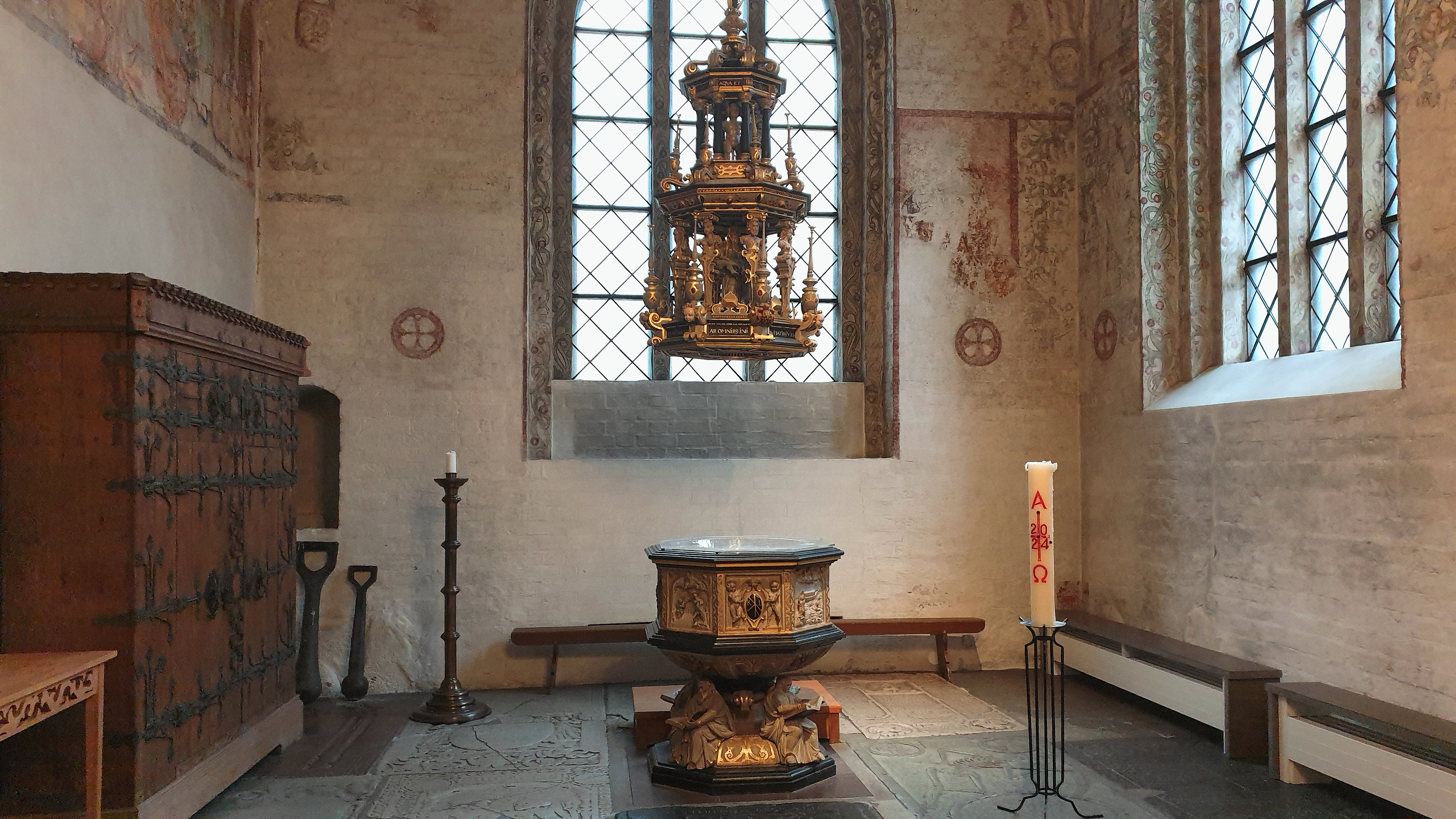
The Merchants' chapel with the baptismal font.

== Interior ==
The inside of the church is characterized by the tall nave, reaching 25 metres (82 ft) at the transept. The walls, pillars and vaults are whitewashed, giving the interior a light and bright atmosphere. Its present state is largely that which it attained at the early 17th century.

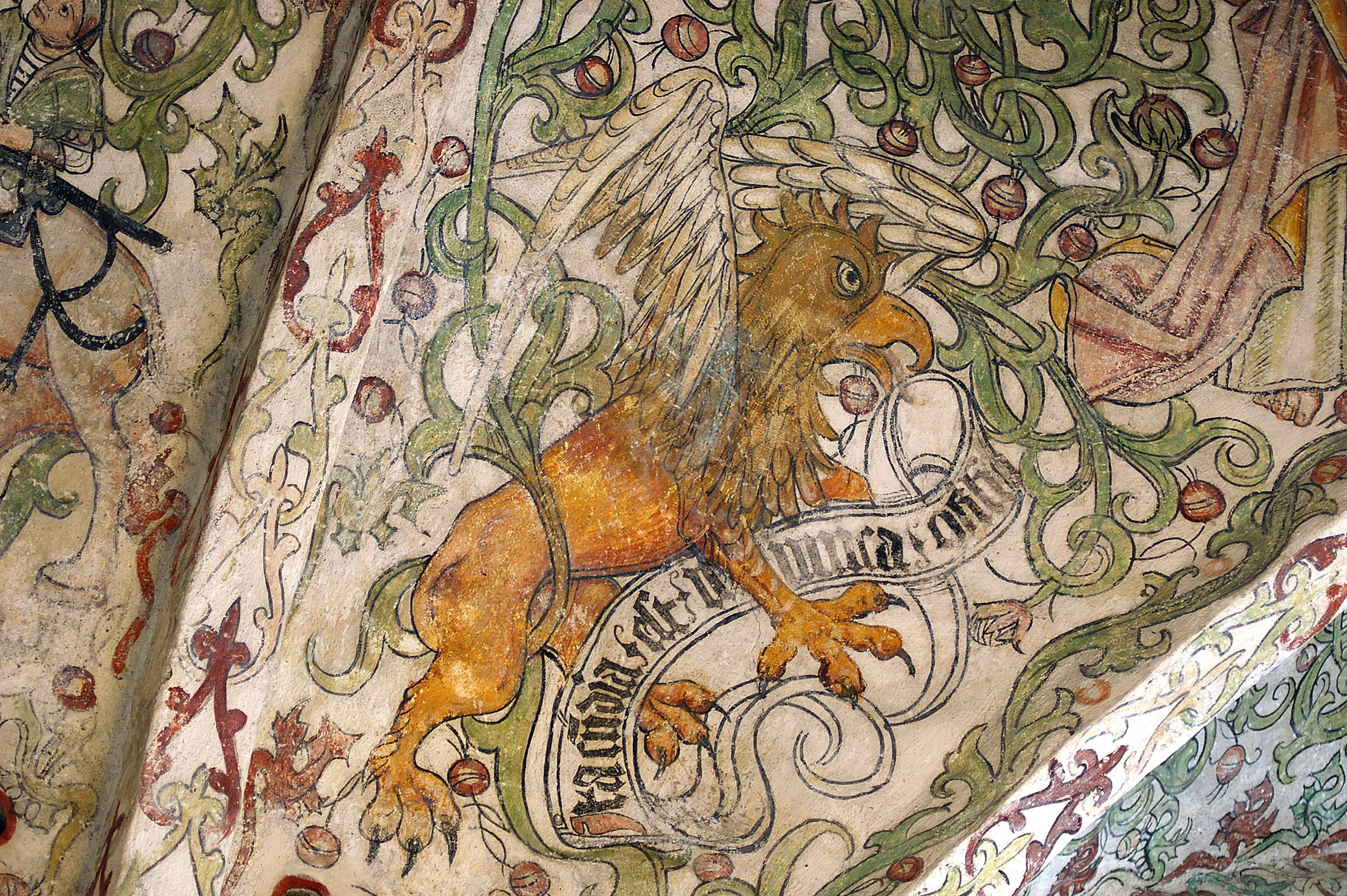
Mural depicting a griffin in The Merchants' chapel. A griffin also appears on the coat of arms of Malmö.

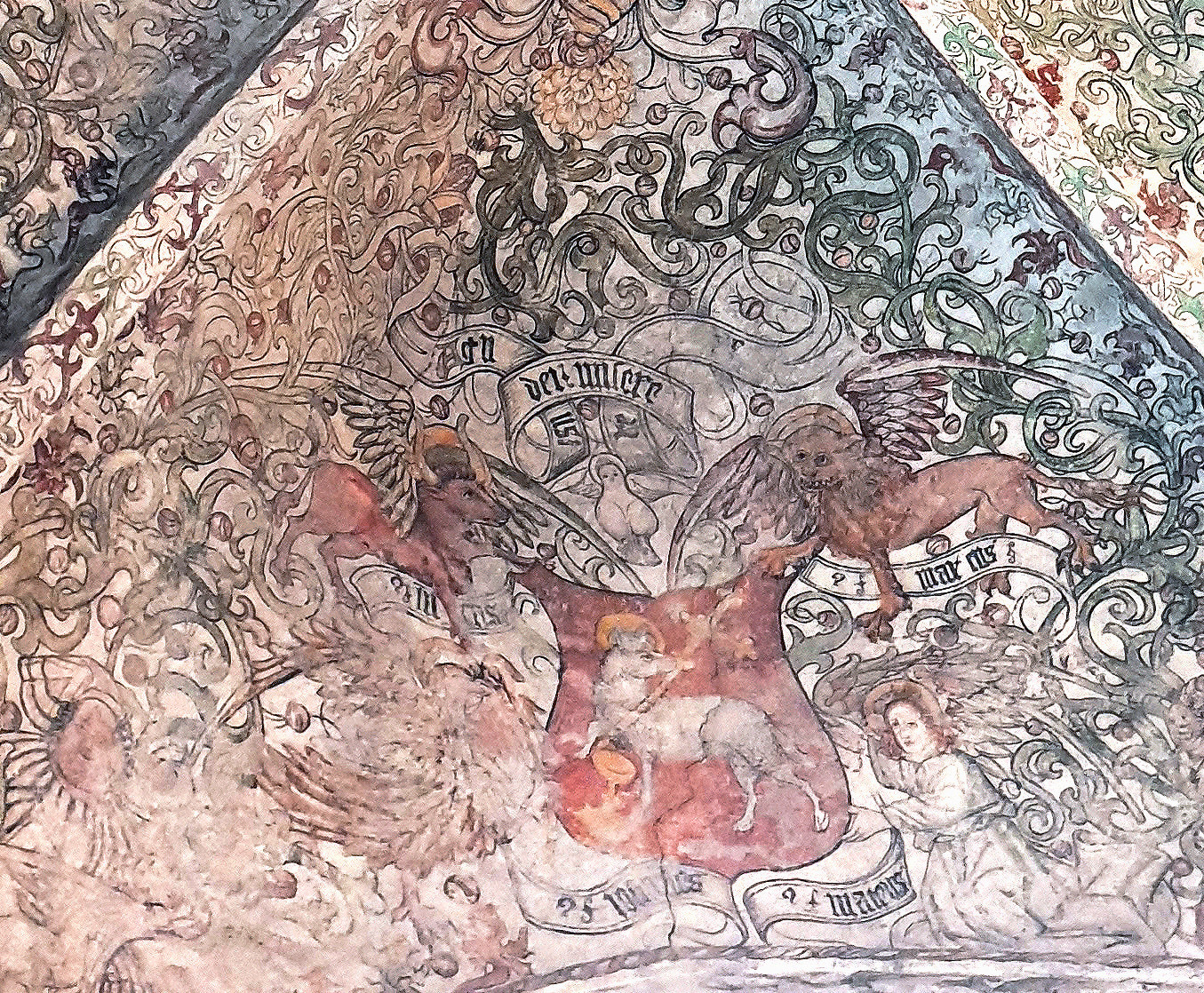
Ceiling mural. Merchants' chapel.

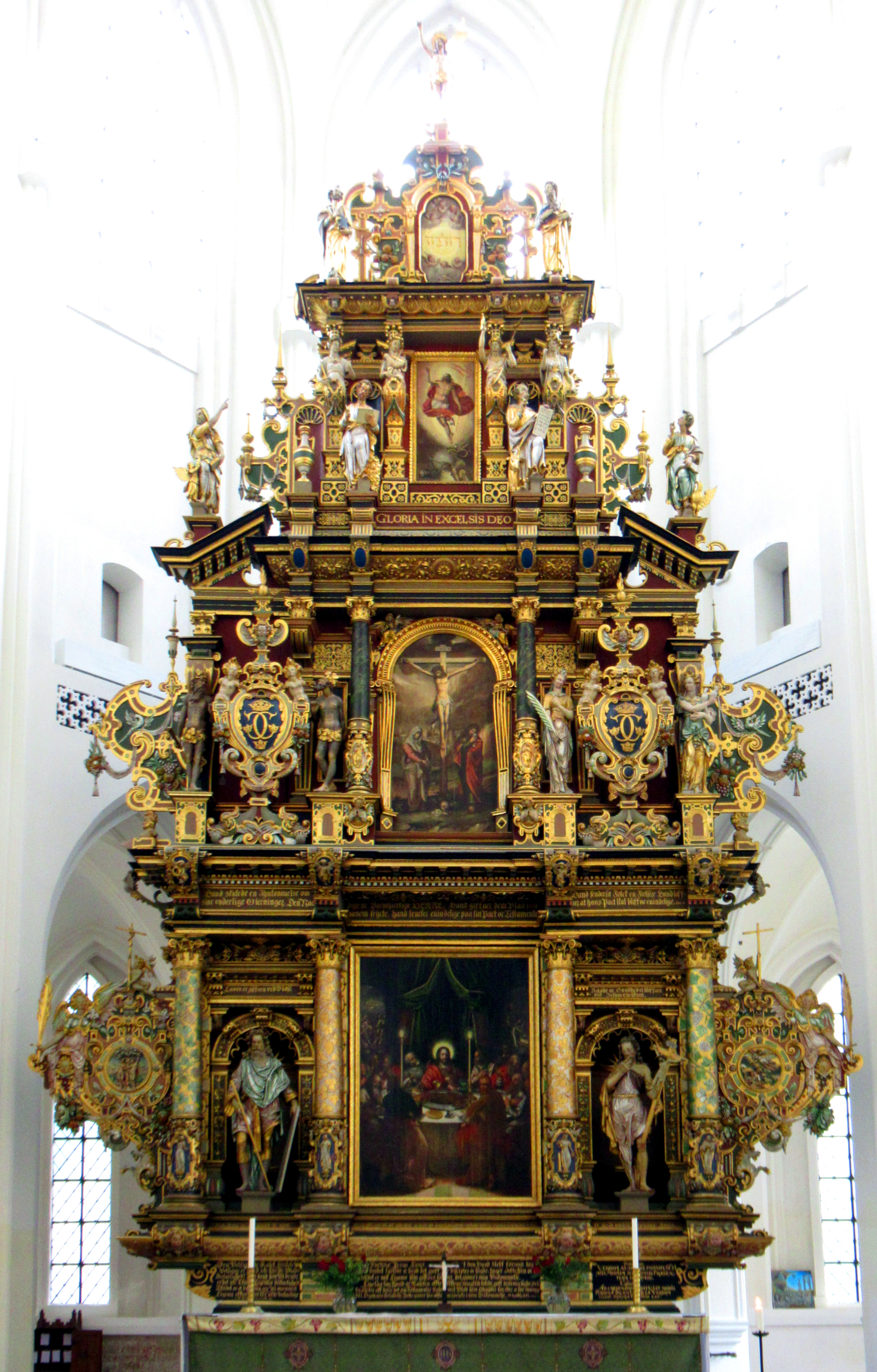
The main altarpiece from 1611 is 15 meters tall

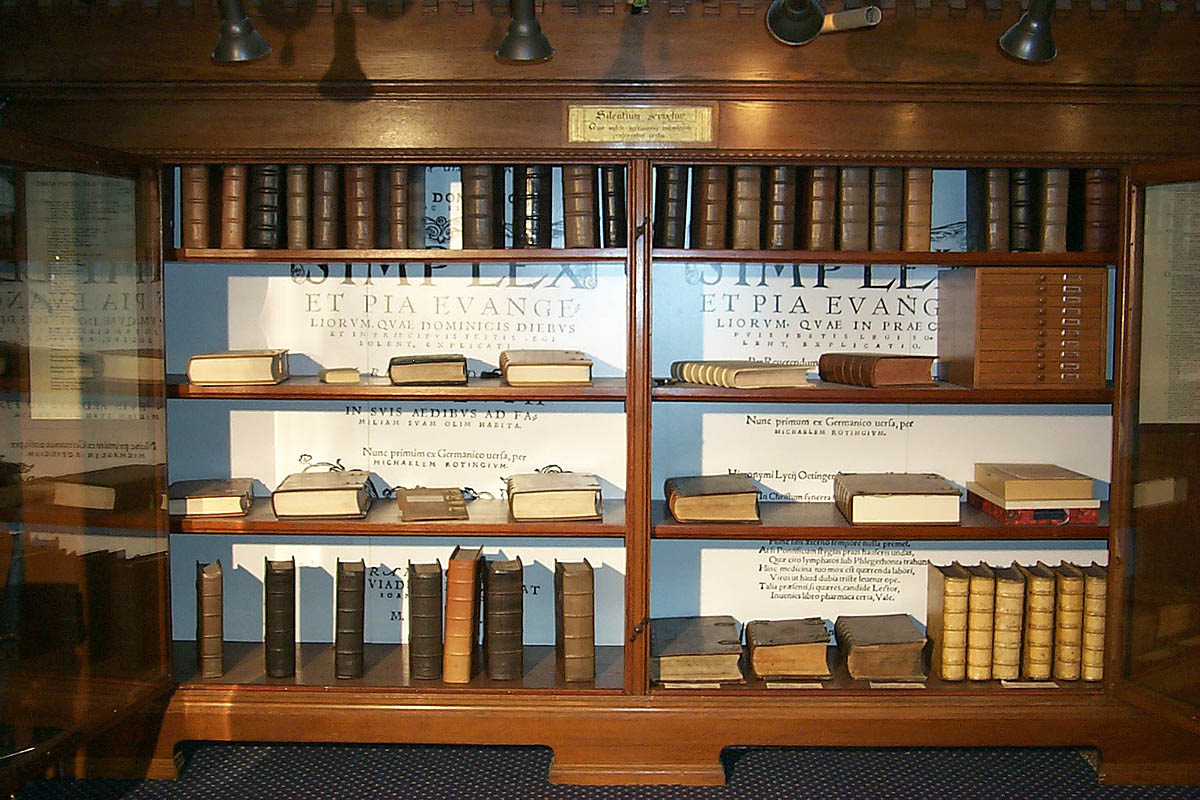
Dringenbergska liberiet, a collection of books from 1506–1570 in the church

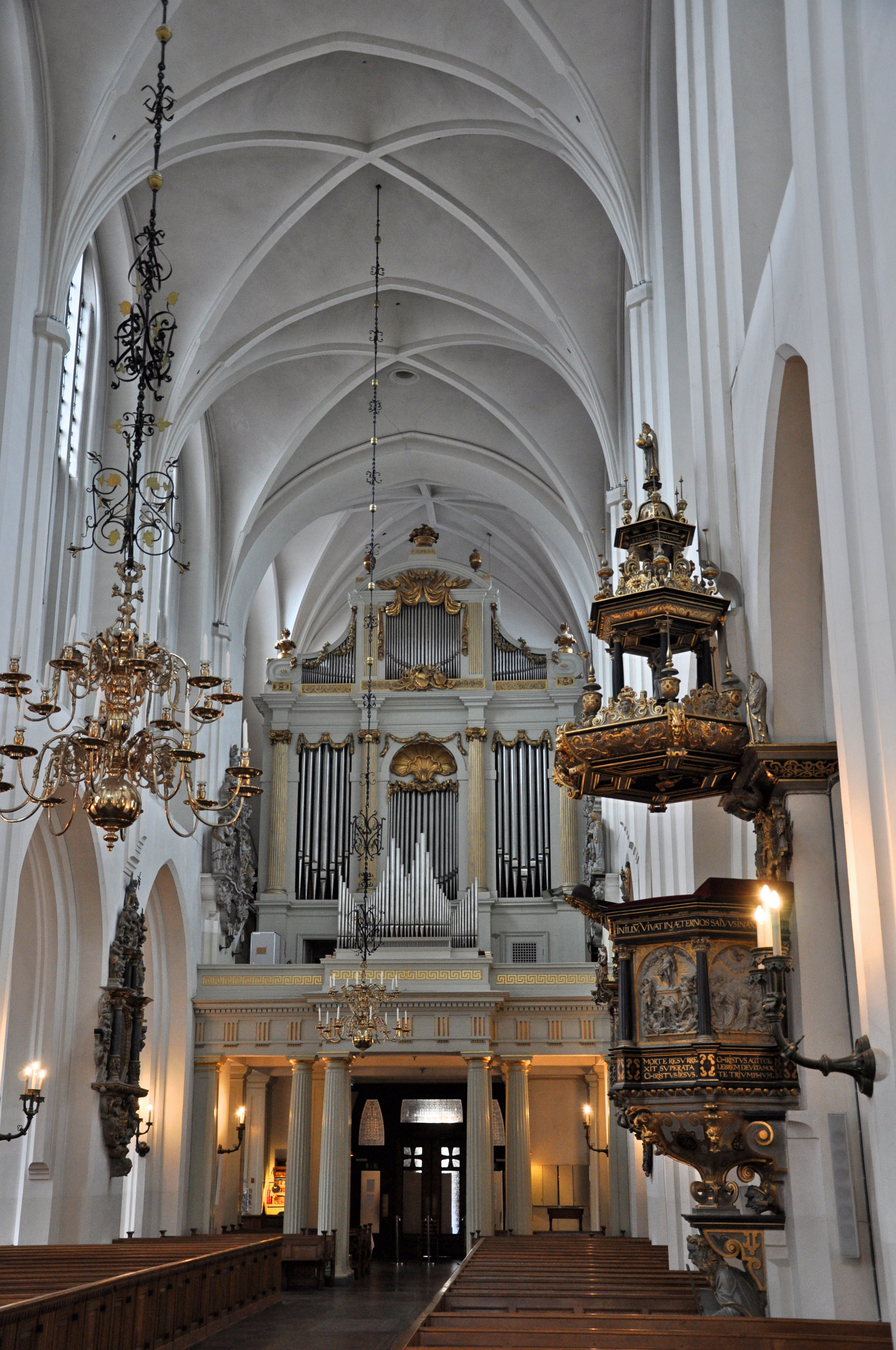
The organ, built in 1951, with a façade from 1797.

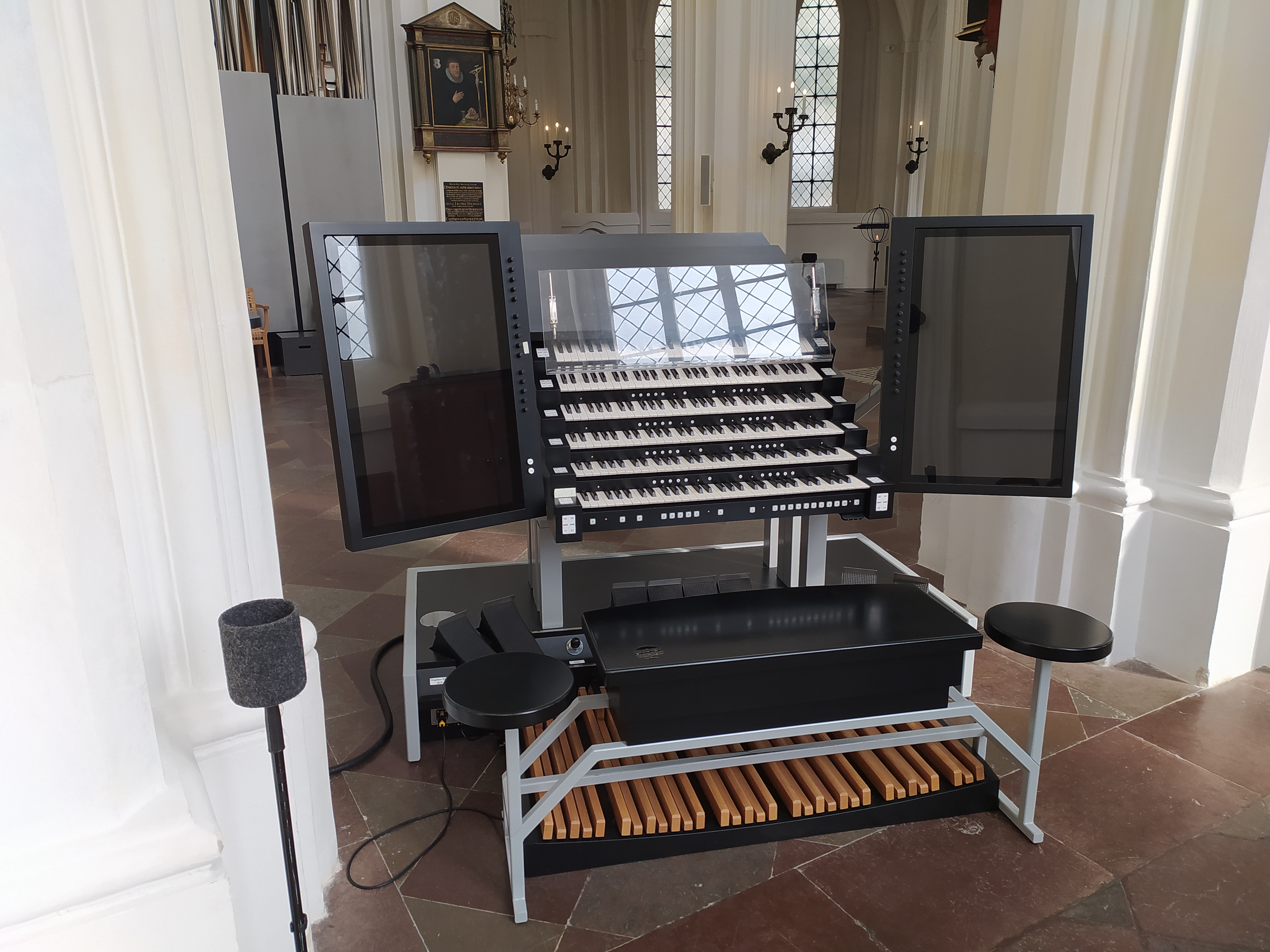
The church is home to one of the most modern organs in the world, and the largest in northern Europe.

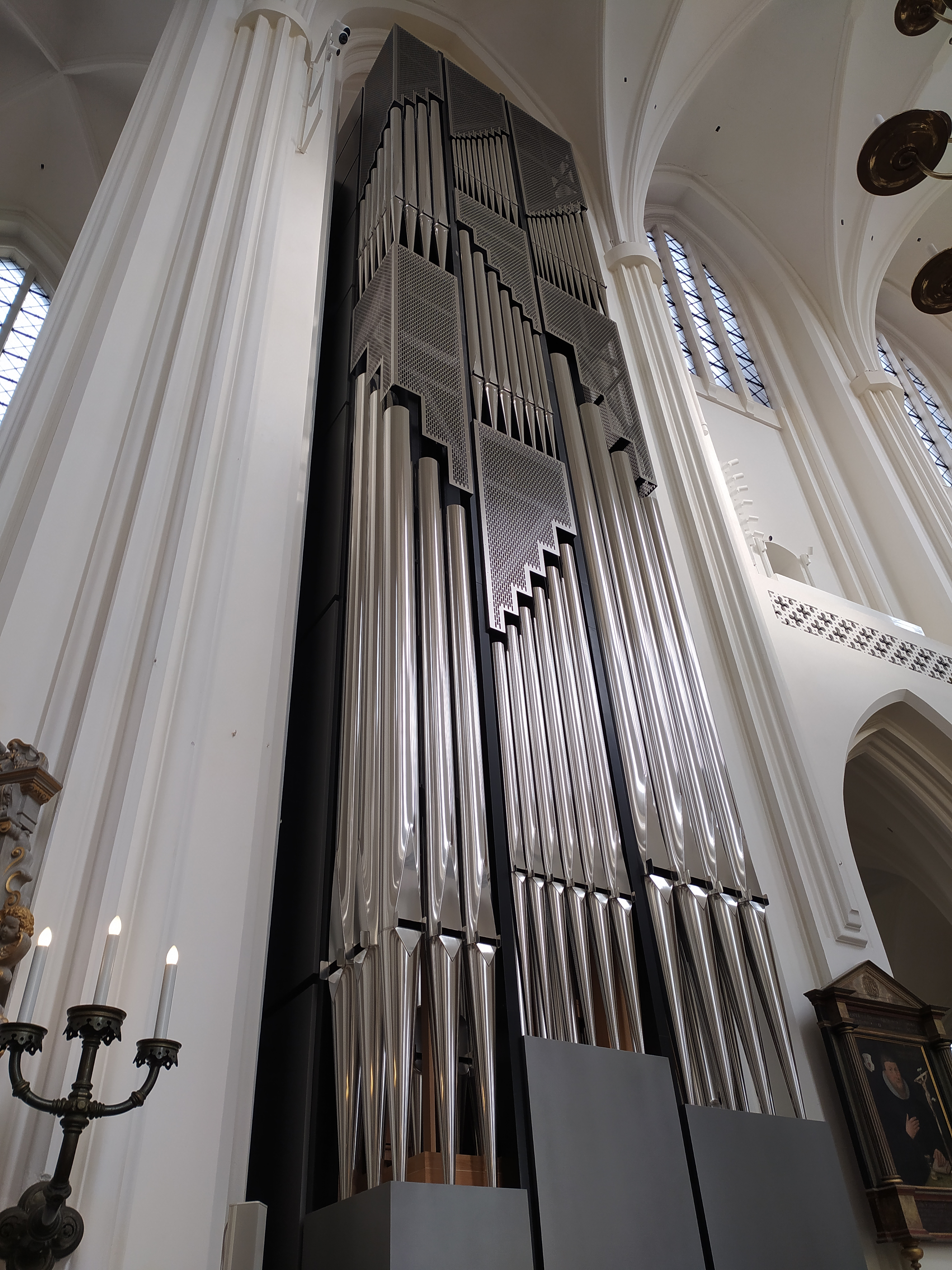
The new choir organ, a "Klais organ", is 14 meters tall, has six manuals and over 200 stops.

=== Murals ===
The Merchants' chapel (Krämarkapellet) is richly decorated with late medieval murals. Some of the paintings may have been made in the 1460s while others date from the early 1510s. They were made by an unknown master or workshop. The murals have been described as being both "iconographically sophisticated" and "technically accomplished" and in stark contrast to the naïveté typical for the many murals made in the countryside churches of the province at approximately the same time. The murals cover both the walls and the vaulted ceiling, and display several different motifs, both secular and religious, set among a background of flowing, green vines.

=== Altarpiece ===
The altarpiece in St. Peter's Church is the largest wooden one in northern Europe. It is made of oak wood and reaches a height of 15 metres (49 ft). It was made in 1611 by several local master carpenters: Jacob Kremberg, Statius Otto, Curt Snedker, Öllrich Svarfer and Henrik Könnicke together with Didrik Moll, a court painter in the service of Christian IV of Denmark, and the painter Pieter Hartman, a local resident. The altarpiece consists of four storeys or levels, one above the other. In the lowermost part there is a depiction of the Last Supper in the centre, and on each side wooden sculptures of Moses and John the Baptist, respectively. Above this there is a depiction of the Crucifixion, and above this there is a representation of the ascension. At the very top is the name of God, Yahweh, displayed.

=== Pulpit ===
The pulpit of the church was inaugurated in 1599. It was commissioned by a member of the city council, Engelbret Fris (or Engelbrekt Friis) and made by Daniel Thomisen. It displays a certain likeness to the pulpit in Lund Cathedral, inaugurated a few years earlier. It is made of black limestone and light sandstone, gilt in several places. The rich ornamentation depicts scenes from the life of Christ.

=== Baptismal font ===
The baptismal font is also made by Daniel Thomisen, and was commissioned by another city council member, Rasmus Ludvigsen. It dates from 1601 and similarly to the pulpit it is made of black limestone. The font is octagonal and six of its sides are decorated with scenes from the Bible. One of the other two sides displays the monogram of the donator and the other an inscription commemorating the donating of the font to the church.

=== Other furnishings ===
The organ is from 1951 but its facade dates from the late 18th century. Modern stained glass windows are located in the chapel of St. Anne, while the chapel of St. Mary contains a wooden Madonna made in 1995, inspired by a medieval Madonna in the Historical Museum at Lund University. The church also contains several elaborate decorated memorials over deceased burghers of the city. The church also contains a small library, Dringenbergska liberiet, with around 40 books from 1506–1570.

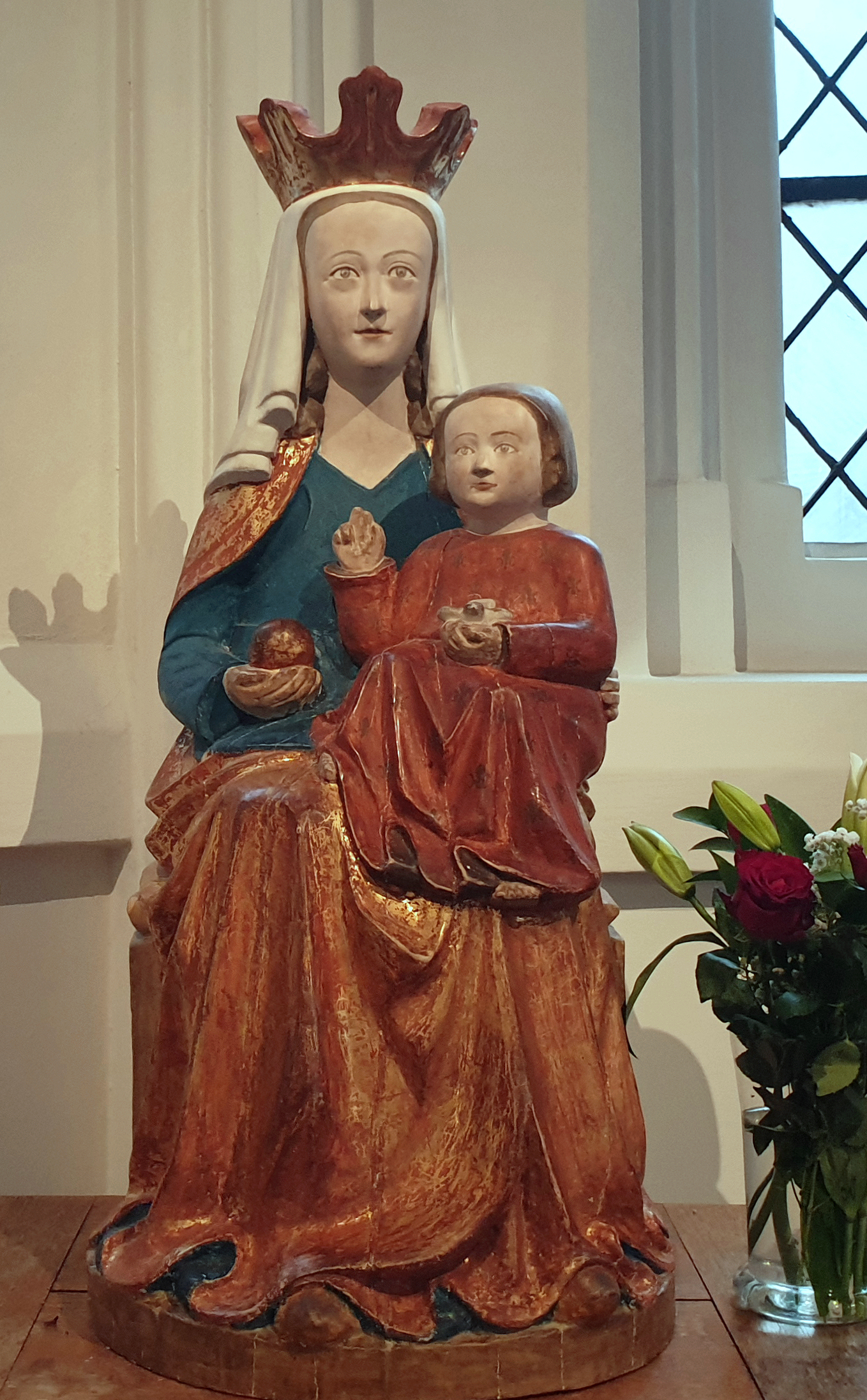
Virgin Mary and child. Sculpture in oak wood, tempera and gold.

== Organs ==
In the 16th century, an organ with 11 stops was built in the church. The organ was later expanded to 21 stops. It was placed on a gallery in the northern transept by the altar. The organ's main action and pedal were sold in 1799 to Genarp church and the back action to Drängsered church. In 1937 the organ was moved from Genarp church to Malmö Museum.

In 1797 Olof Schwan of Stockholm built an organ with 34 stops.

In 1914, E F Walcker & Co, Ludwigsburg, Germany built an organ with 73 stops.

The current organ was built in 1951 by Marcussen & Søn, Aabenraa, Denmark. The organ has free and fixed combinations. The organ has mechanical action in manuals I, II, III and pedal, electrical action in manual IV and electrical registration. The façade is from the 1797 organ.

2016 saw the first of several rebuilds and extensions to the church organs. The main organ in the west gallery was revoiced and three years later it was expanded with Soubasse 32', Basse acoustique 64' Chamade 16', 8' and 4'. The revoicing was carried out by Th. Frobenius & Sönner and Mårtenssons orgelbyggeri. The new stops were made by Orgelbau Klais in Bonn. Both the altar organ and the echo organ, originally from Walcker's instrument, were also restored by organ builder Anders Sällström.

In May 2019, a brand new choir organ built by the German organ company Klais was inaugurated. The organ has around twenty existing stops. These are expanded in octaves, which thus allows a large number of transmissions and with the help of modern technology it is also possible to build your own voices and sounds in any way you want. In addition to a number of effect voices, there is also a large overtone work. The organ can be played from a new six-manual console from which the Marcussen organ and the remote works can also be operated.

The initiator of the renovation of the Marcussen organ and the construction of the choir organ is Carl Adam Landström, chief organist of St. Peter's Church.

The smaller choir organ was moved here in 1977 from St. Anna's Chapel. It was built in 1964 by Paul Ott, Göttingen, Germany and is a mechanical organ. The façade is new and designed by Eiler Graebe.

== Bibliography ==
- Dahlberg, Markus; Sjöström, Ingrid, eds. (2015). Skåne. Landskapets kyrkor (in Swedish). Stockholm: Swedish National Heritage Board. ISBN 978-91-7209-710-0.
- Jacobsson, Britta; Johansson, Eva; Johansson, Per; Andersson, Rolf (1990). Våra kyrkor. Västervik: Klarkullens förlag AB. p. 456. ISBN 91-971561-08.
- Rosborn, Sven (2016). Det medeltida Malmö, Detektivarbeten under mer än ett sekel i en gammal stads historia (in Swedish). Malmö. ISBN 978-91-639-1837-7.
- Wahlöö, Claes (2014). Skånes kyrkor 1050–1949 (in Swedish). Kävlinge: Domus Propria. ISBN 978-91-637-5874-4.
- Wåhlin, Theodor (1919). Malmö S:t Petri Kyrka (in Swedish). Malmö: Förlagsaktiebolaget i Malmö Boktryckeri.
- Öhlund, Jenny (2010). Uppåt väggarna! Byggnadshistoria och förändringar i Malmös S:t Petri kyrka. Lunds Universitet.
