= Lilla Torg, Malmö =

Square in Malmö, Sweden

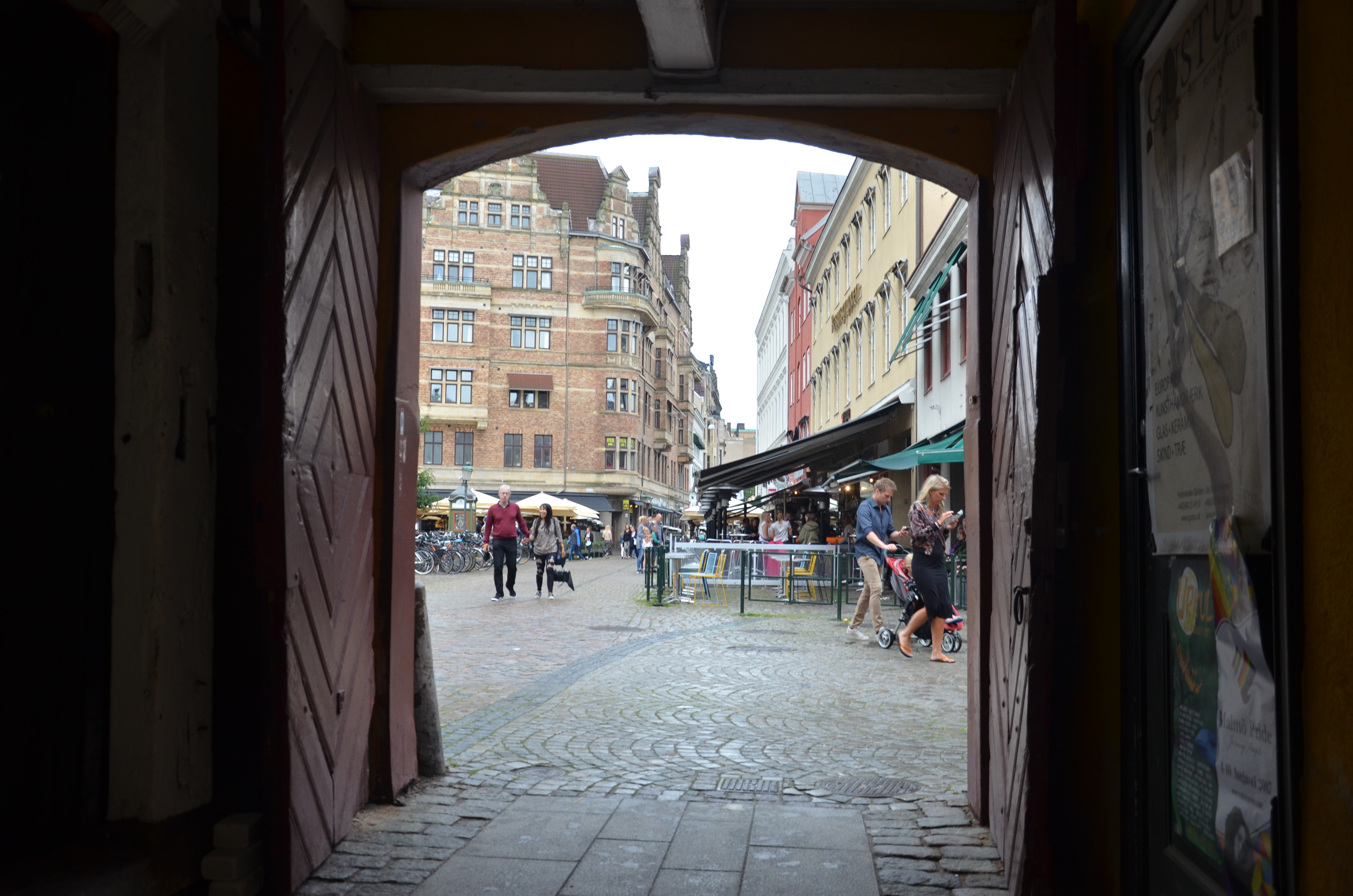
- Lilla torg in 2017, seen from inside Hedmanska gården.
- Interactive map of the Lilla Torg, Malmö area

General information
- Coordinates: 55.60511°N 12.99880°E

Lilla Torg ("Little Square") is a square in Gamla Staden (the Old Town) in central Malmö, Sweden. It is located right next to Stortorget. There are a number of restaurants around the square and in the summer it is full of people on the outdoor terraces. The municipality used to build a skating rink on the square, but this has now been moved to Stortorget.

== History ==
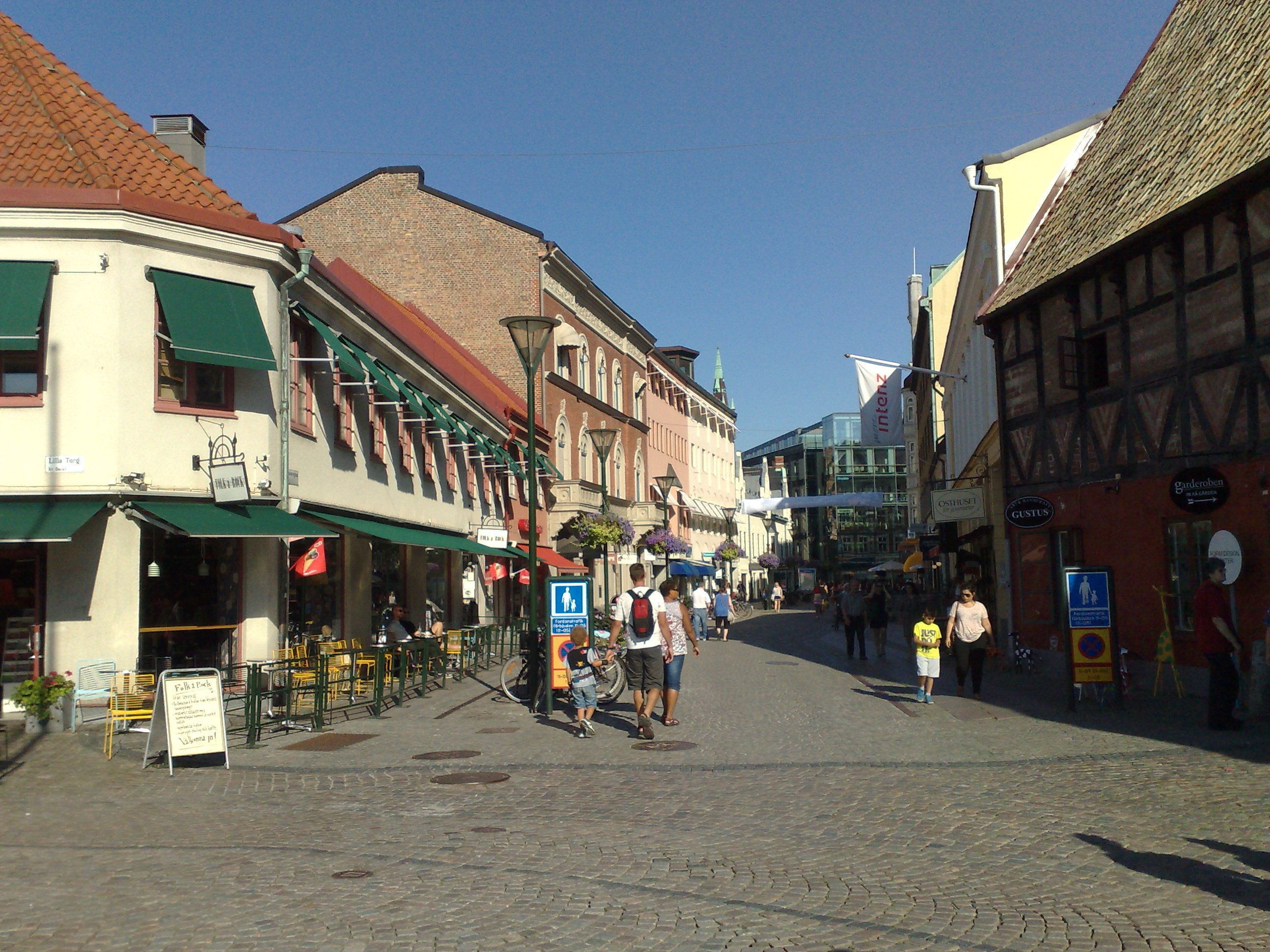
Lilla Torg and Skomakaregatan.(2013)

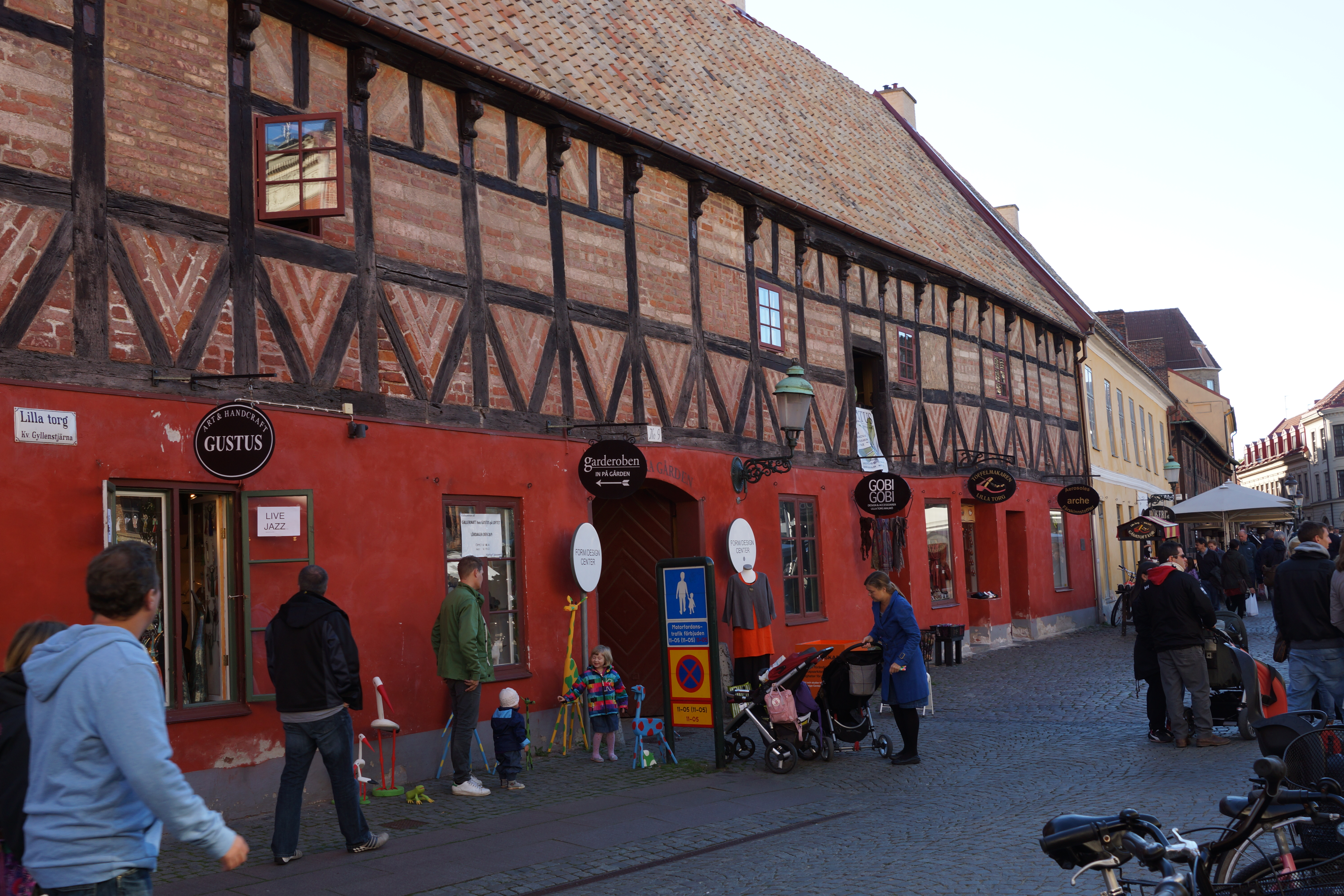
Hedmanska gården, from the 1590s.

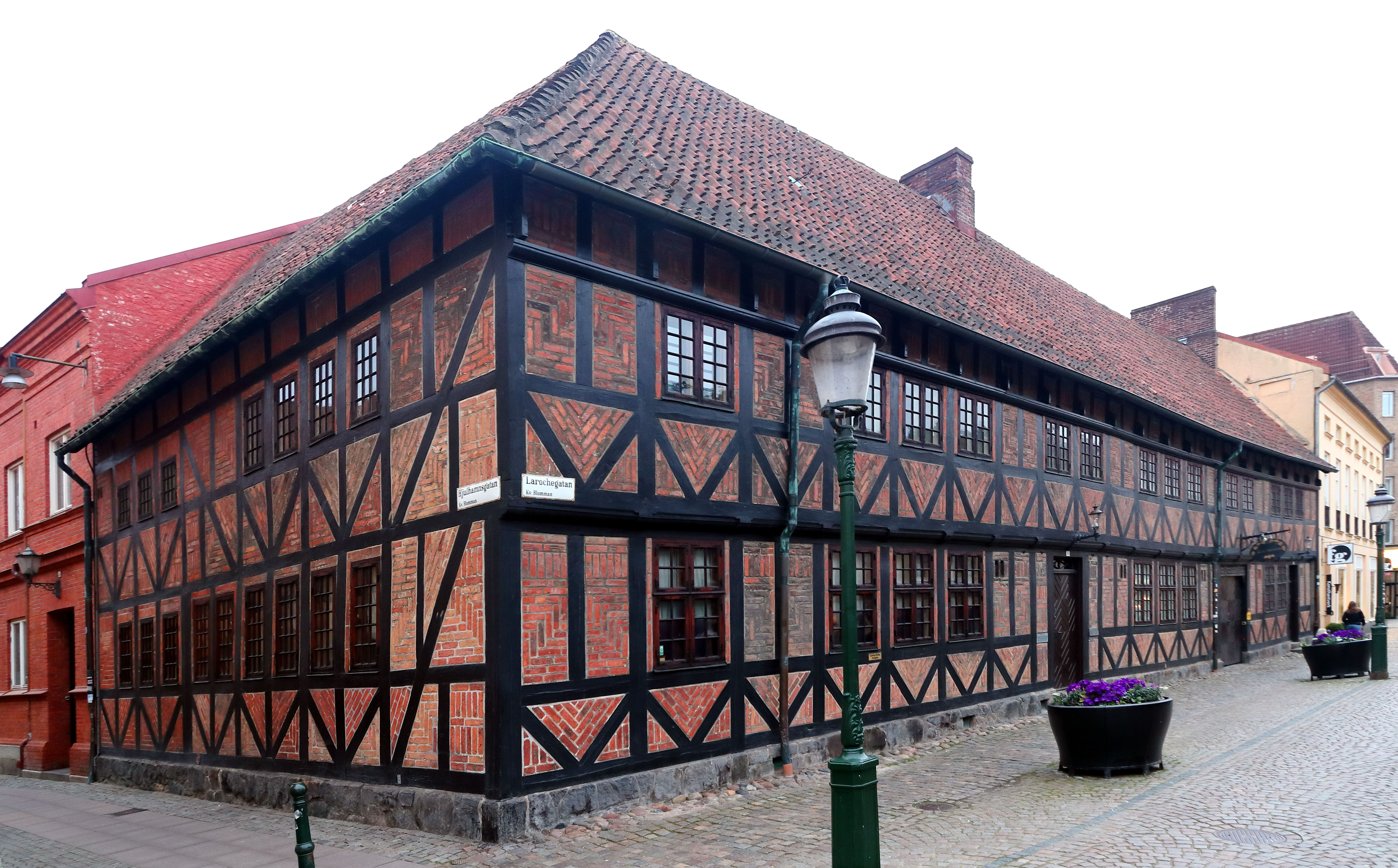
Faxeska huset, from the 1760s.

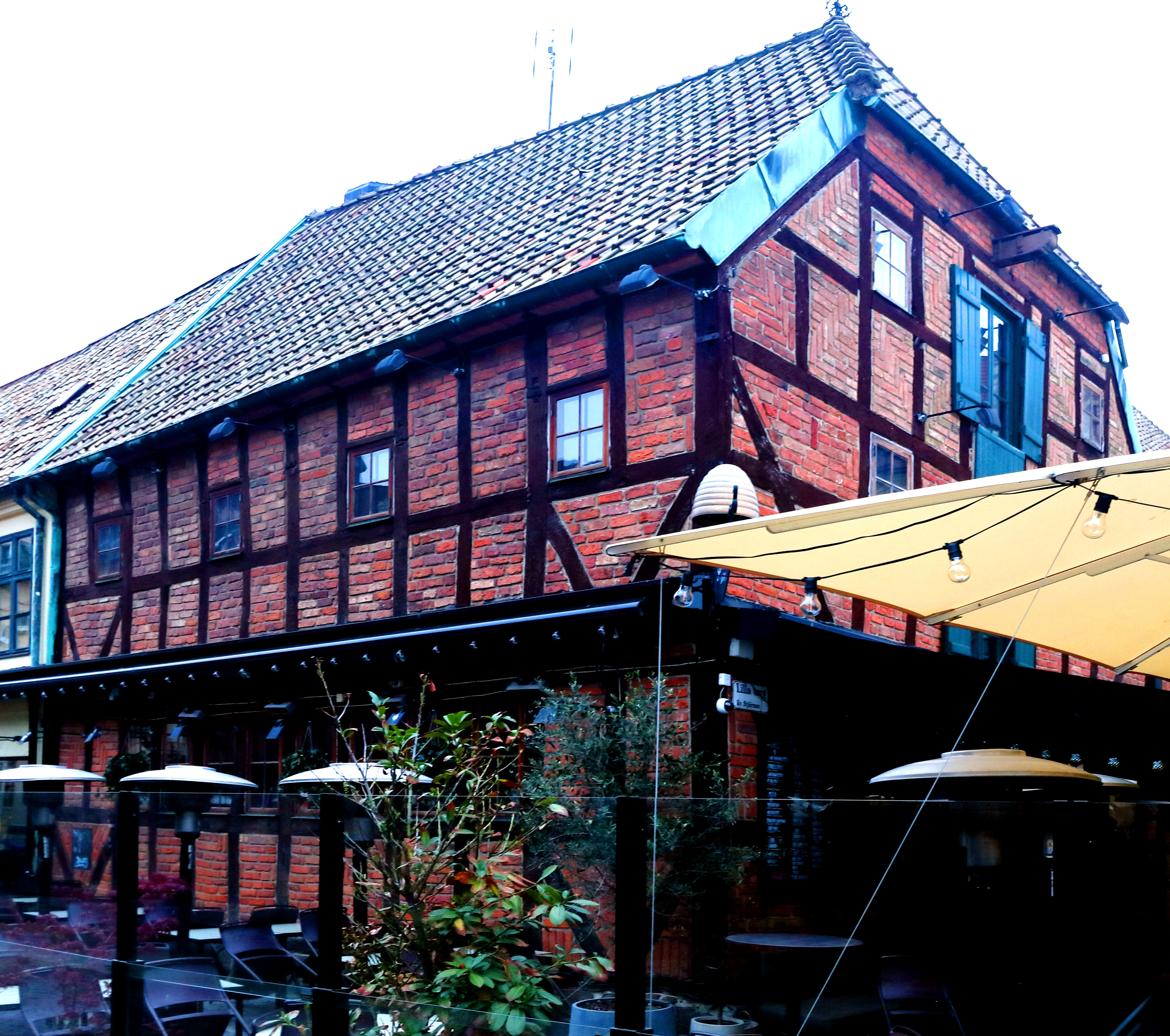
The Ekströmska huset, dating from the 1720s.

During the latter half of the 16th century, "a large wasteland" is mentioned southwest of Stortorget. At this time the area was low-lying and does not seem to have been attractive for building. Only after filling it in was Lilla torg, an extension of Stortorget, created in the 1590s. This is where burghers' wives and maids went to buy their daily household goods. On the west side of the square, people crowded around the meat counters, while the bakers on the south side of the square offered freshly baked bread. Along the eastern side of the square were the fishmongers and in the north the hawkers, the grocers. The small stalls of the hawkers and fishmongers disappeared in the 18th century and were replaced by real houses. Lilla torg was being swallowed up by permanent buildings. Around the turn of the century 1900 there used to be older small so-called square-houses placed on the square itself. They were replaced by a market hall built in 1902–1903 after drawings by Salomon Sörensen. The market hall was built in a Gothic Revival style in red brick and covered the entire square. In the 1960s, a so-called cultural environment project was carried out. The market hall was demolished in 1968 and the entire area of Lilla Torg was now opened up to its original extent.

South of the square is Hedmanska gården (The Hedman Estate), an old half-timbered house dating back to the 1590s. Inside the house is the Form/Design Center, with a gallery and exhibitions. Next to Hedmanska gården, on the other side of Hjulhamnsgatan, is the Faxeska huset (The Faxe House) from the 1760s.

Today there are two half-timbered houses on the western side of the square. The corner house, Ekströmska huset, was built in the 1720s, while the adjacent house, Aspegrenska huset, despite its old appearance, is newly built. Sculpted parts, however, date back to the 17th century. The brick building in the northwest corner of the square was built in the 19th century as a factory and served for a while as a market hall, but is now a 5-star hotel. The street that used to run along the western side of the square was called Torggatan (the eastern one was called Östra Torggatan) - these street names disappeared in 1969. At the same time, Landbygatan and Larochegatan, which previously ran along the north and south sides of the square, were shortened and the whole area is now called Lilla Torg.

The square fountain by artist Thure Thörn was added in 1973. The reliefs on the fountain show symbols of the square's four old traders' professions. Lilla Torg's football team is called Lilla Torg FF and plays at Mariedals IP.

=== Sweden's most beautiful square ===
In 2021 the association Arkitekturupproret (Architectural Rebellion) organized an online vote for Sweden's most beautiful square. They nominated 101 squares, aiming for a geographical spread and distribution across different sizes of town. The vote was then held on Facebook with a participation of 25,000. Lilla Torg in Malmö won (1611 votes). Karlskrona's Stortorget came in second (1191 votes).
