= Stortorget, Malmö =

Square in Malmö, Sweden

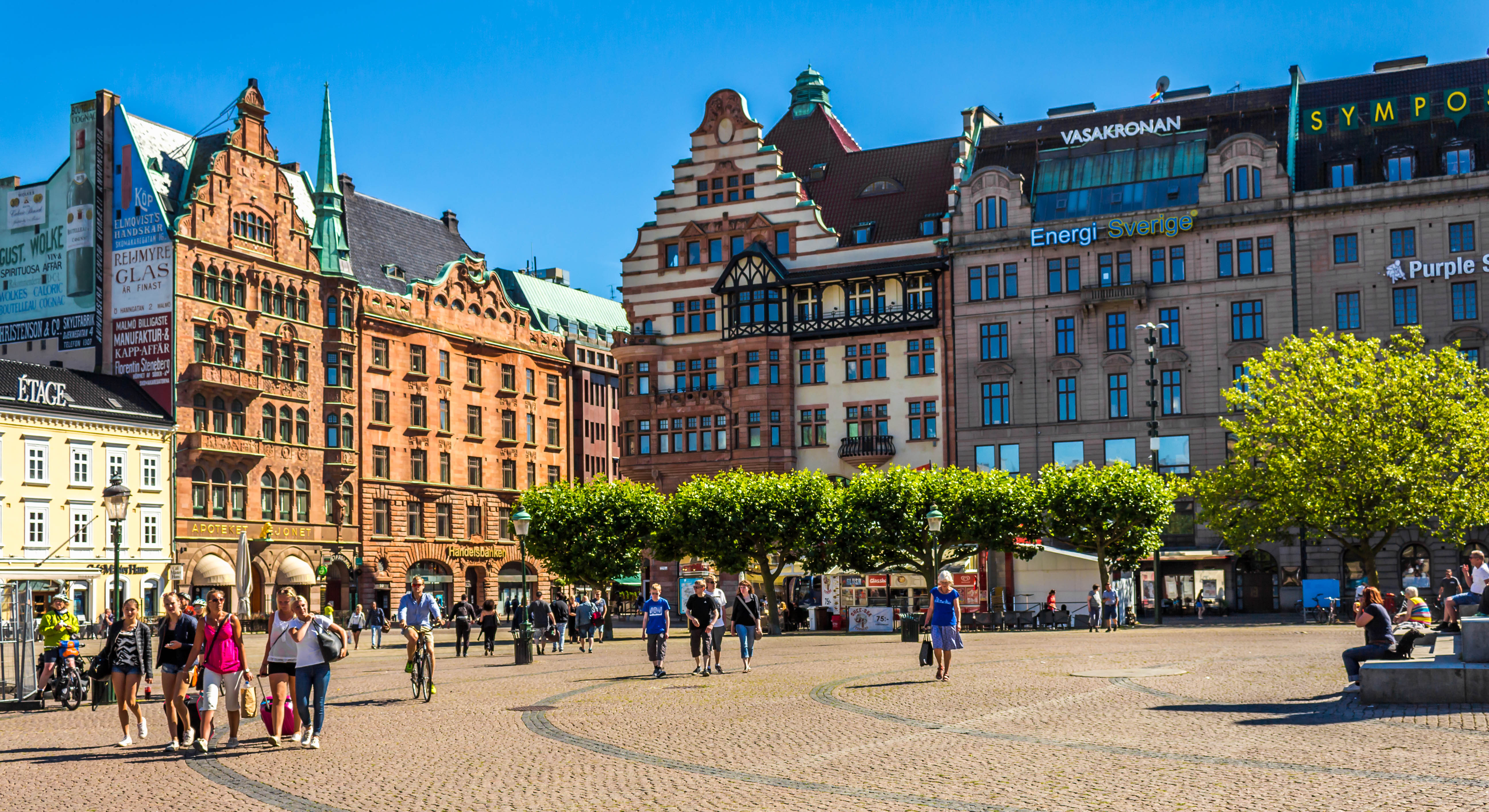
- Stortorget in Malmö. (2015)
- Interactive map of the Stortorget, Malmö area

General information
- Coordinates: 55.60617°N 13.00024°E

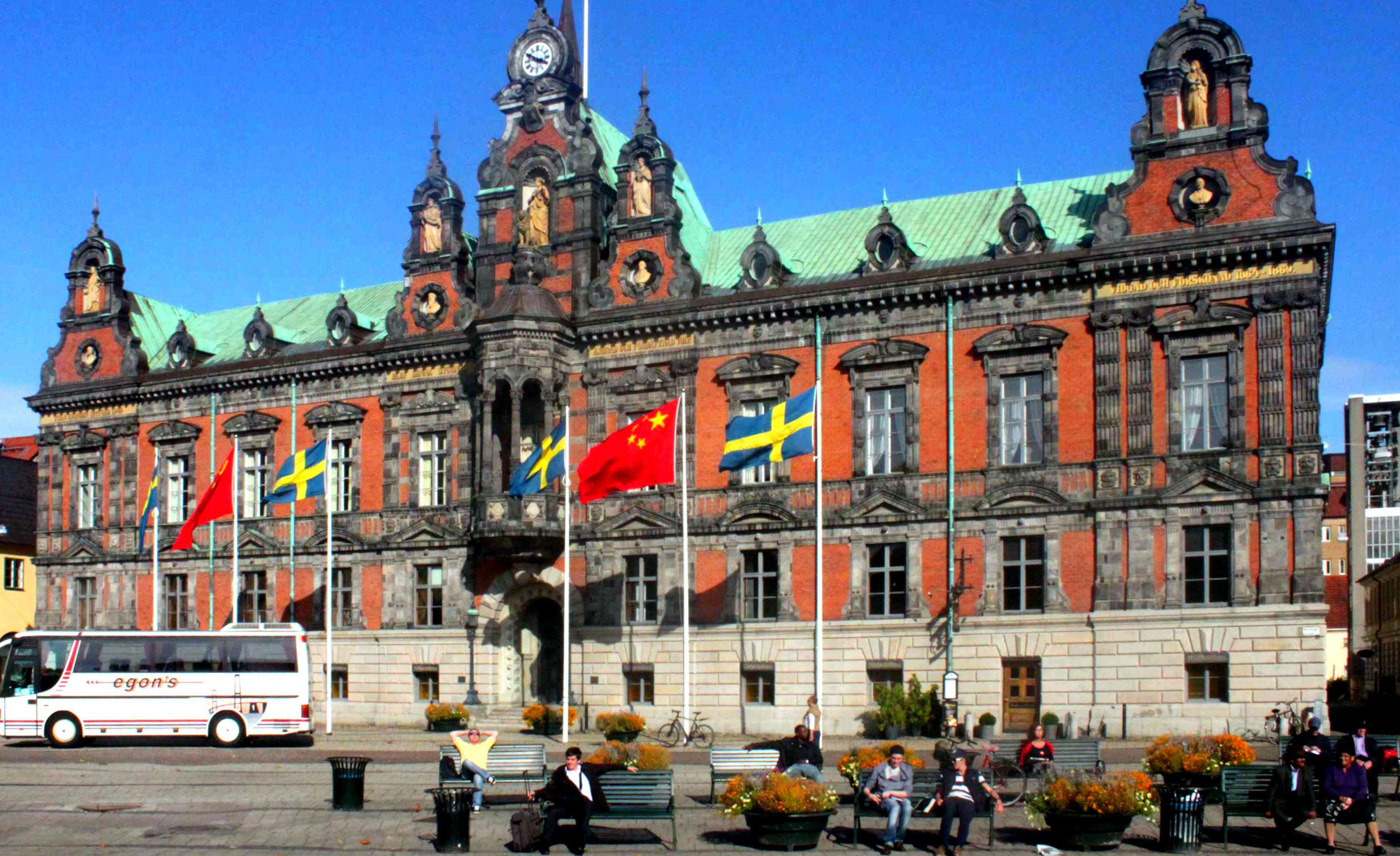
Malmö Rådhus (Malmö Town Hall) from 1547, last rebuilt in the 1860s.

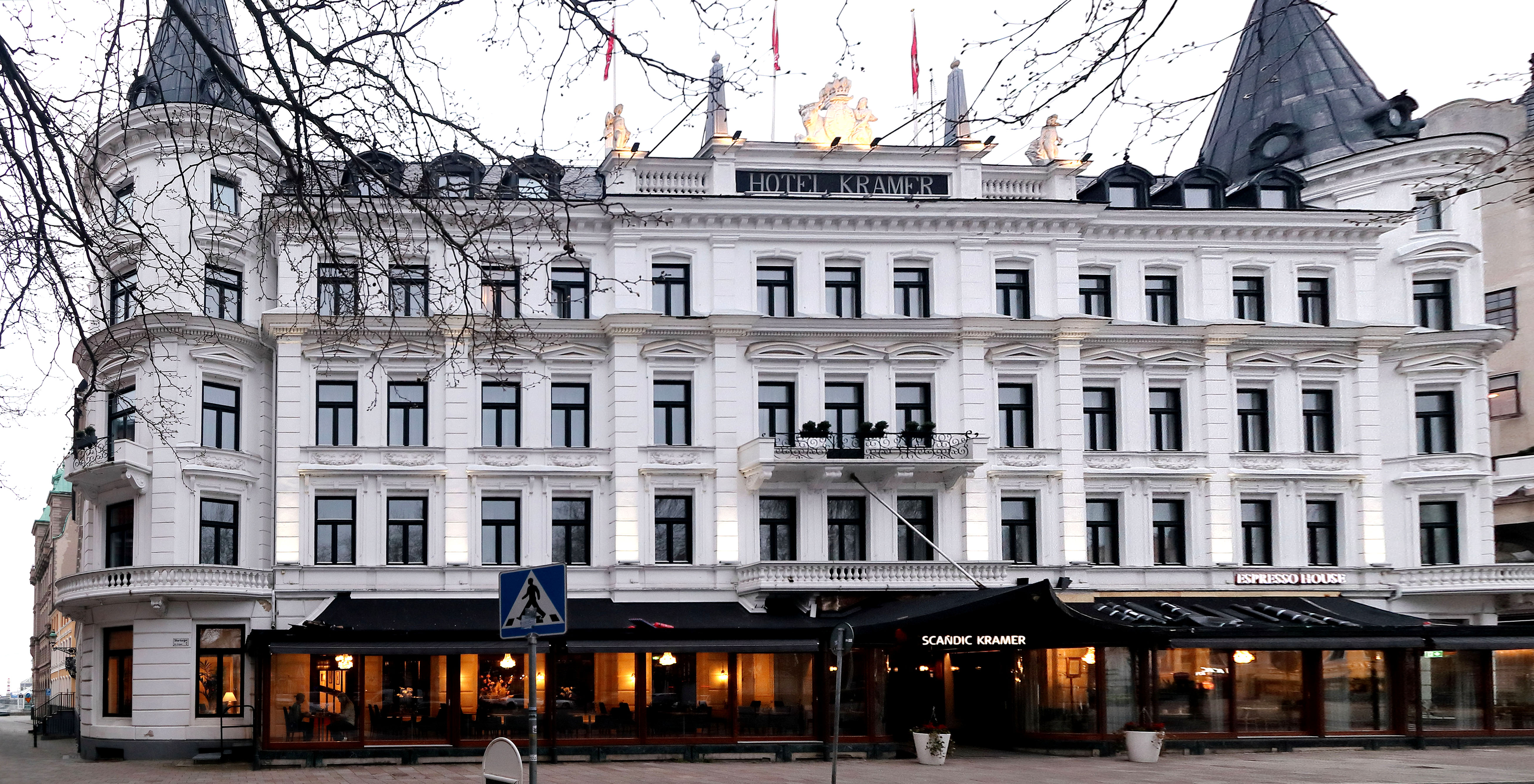
The Kramer Hotel, built 1875–1878.

Stortorget (transl. "The Main Square", lit. "The Big Square") is a square in Malmö. Construction began in 1538 with the demolition of The Monastery of the Holy Spirit (Heligandsklostret), which with its cemetery occupied about 70% of the area of the future square. A note in 1542 refers to the site as thet ny torg ("the new square"). The stately Malmö Town Hall (Rådhuset), the largest of its kind in the Nordic countries at the time, located on the eastern side of the square, was inaugurated in 1547.

At Stortorget are The Governor's Residence, Malmö Town Hall, Jørgen Kock's House, the Kramer Hotel, and The Lion Pharmacy (Apoteket Lejonet). In the middle of the square stands an equestrian statue of King Charles X Gustav, sculpted by John Börjeson and created in connection with the Craft and Industry Exhibition in Malmö in 1896. The statue was initiated by the newspaperman and politician Carl Herslow and the history professor Martin Weibull.

Stortorget has historically been Malmö's most central square, but with the electrification of the tramway, this role was increasingly taken over by Gustav Adolf's square. Stortorget was served by horsecars in 1887–1907, horse-drawn omnibuses in 1898-1907 and electric trams in 1906–1957.

Just southwest of Stortorget is Lilla torg, and about 250 m straight south (along Södergatan) is Gustav Adolfs torg. As a curiosity, the meridian 13° east passes through Stortorget, which means that its mean solar time is exactly (if you are standing in the right place) eight minutes behind Central European Time (i.e. Swedish Standard Time).

== Gallery ==
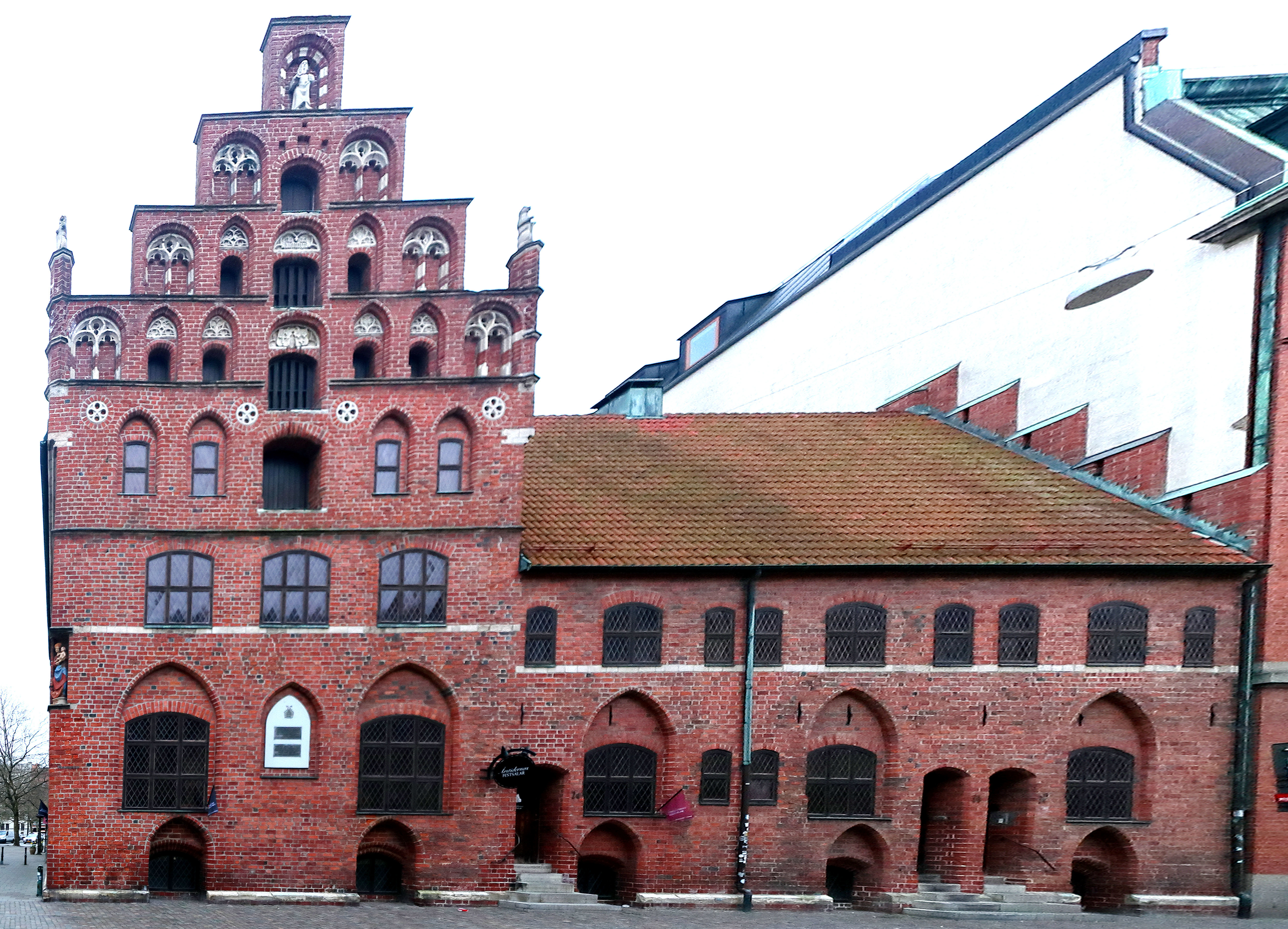
Jörgen Kock's House from 1524. The Swedish king, Gustav Vasa, stayed in this house for a week that year.

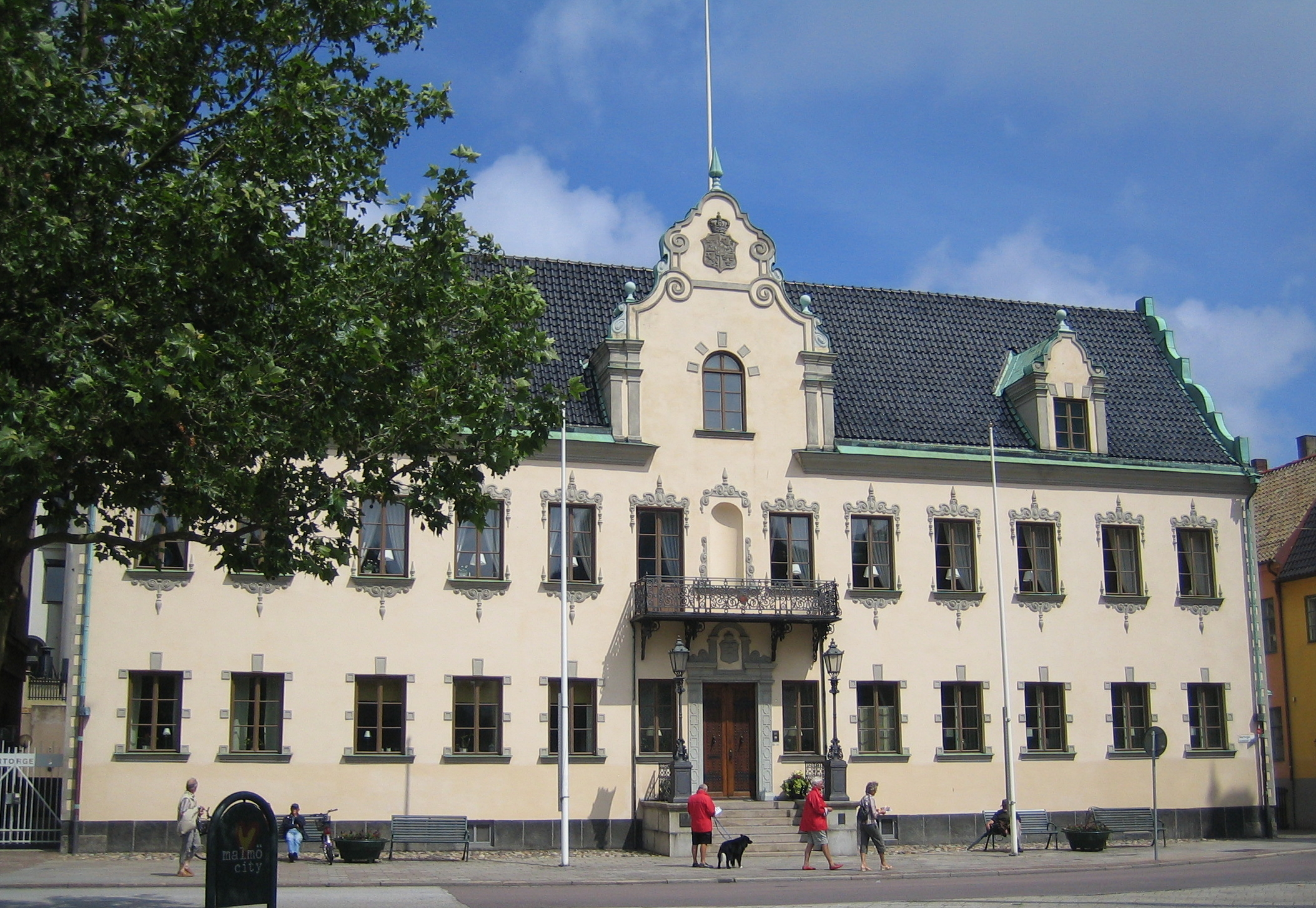
Residenset (The Governor's Residence) from the end of the 16th century, last rebuilt in 1849.

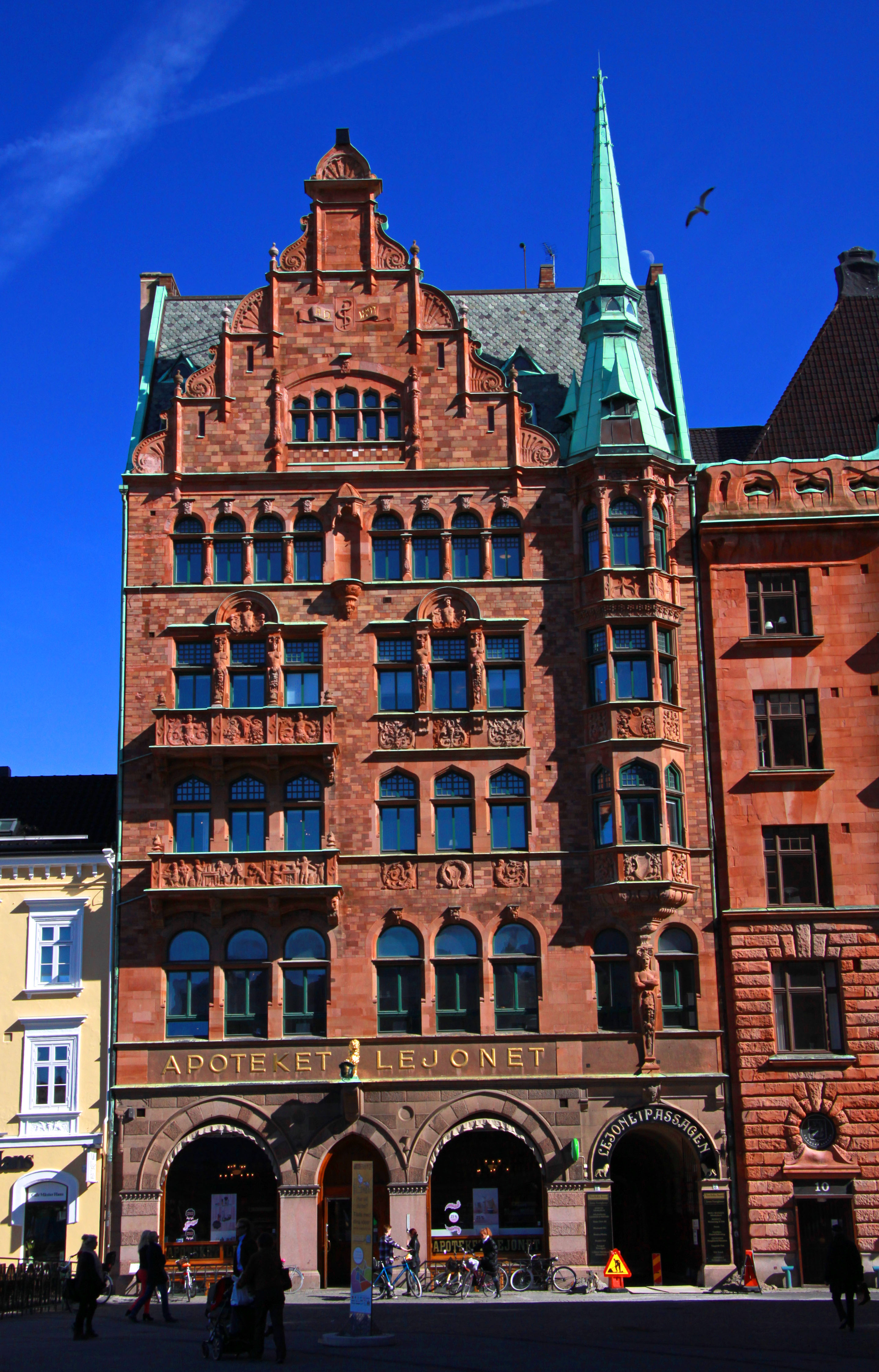
Apoteket Lejonet (The Lion Pharmacy), from 1575, the building from 1896. One of four preserved Cultural pharmacies in Sweden.

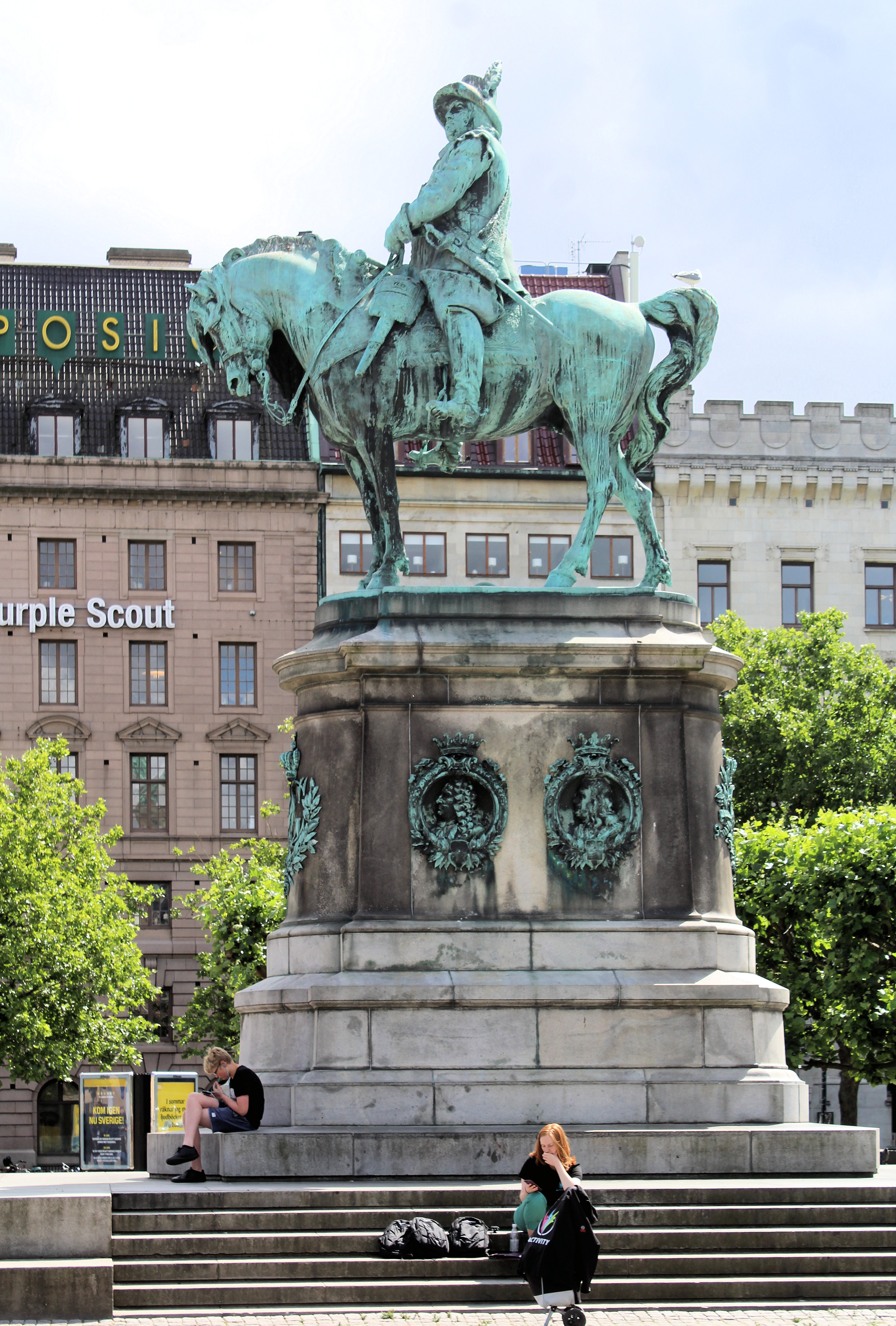
Statue of Charles X Gustav from 1896.
