= Halo (religious iconography) =

Religious symbol representing a ring of light around the head or whole body

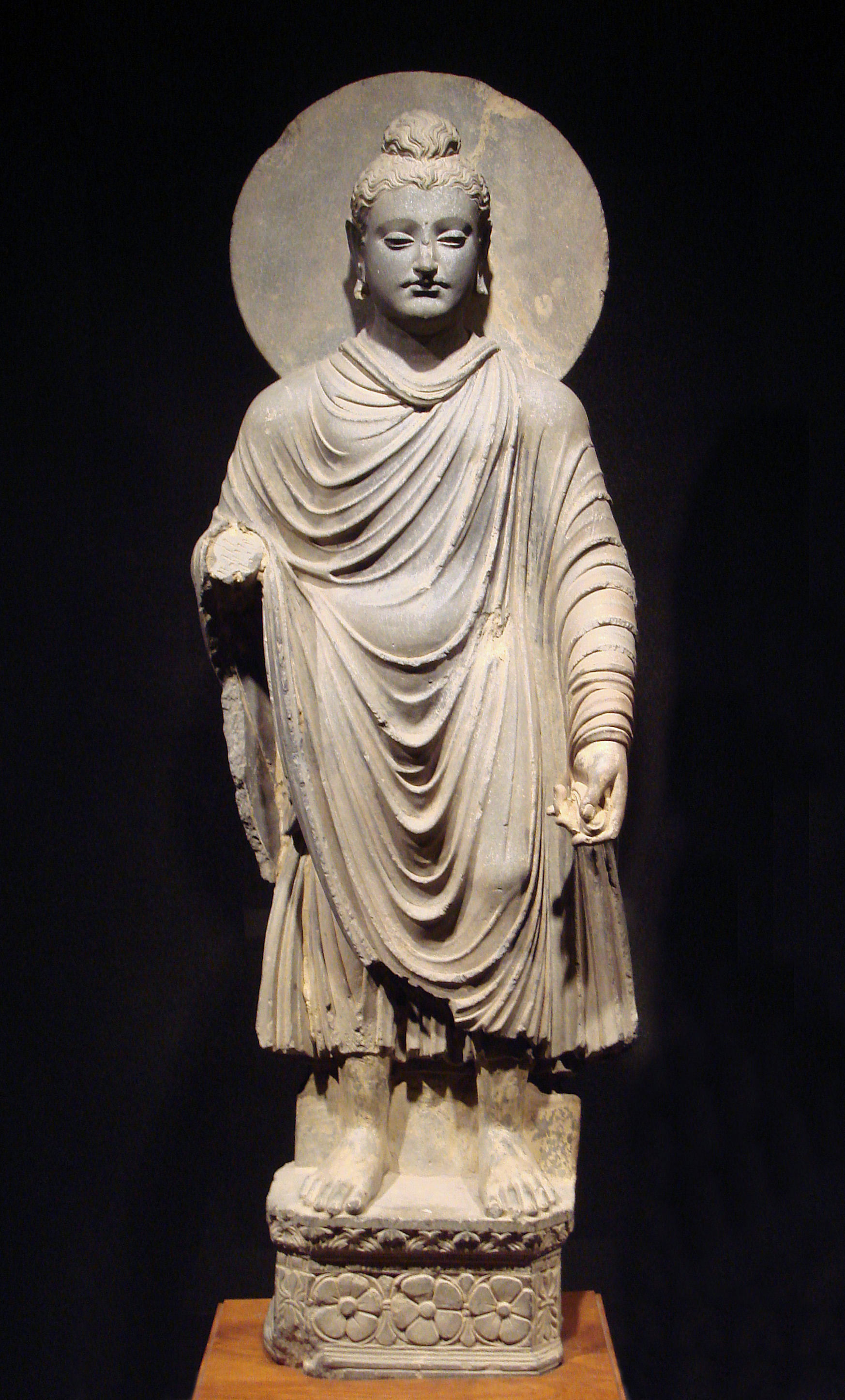
Standing Buddha with a halo, 1st–2nd century AD (or earlier), Greco-Buddhist art of Gandhara

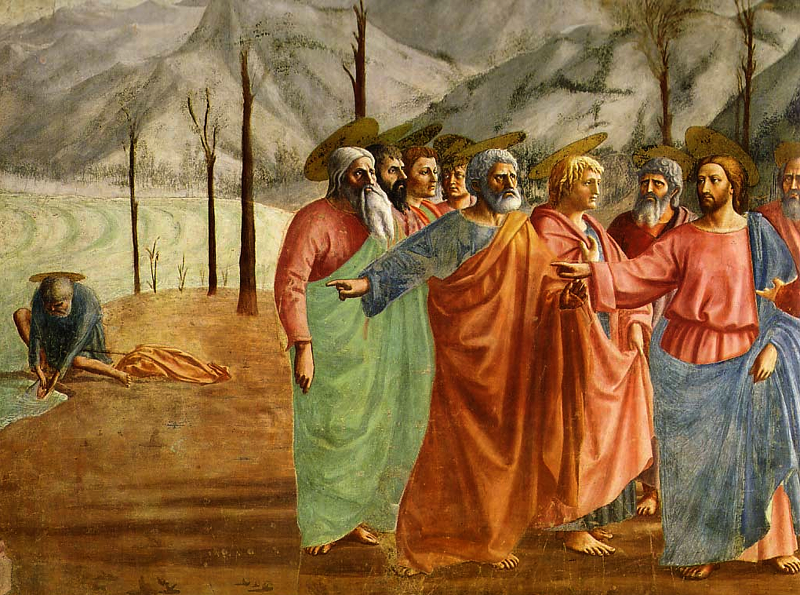
Jesus and nine of the Twelve Apostles depicted with "Floating" disk haloes in perspective (detail from The Tribute Money, illustrating Matthew 17:24–27, by Masaccio, 1424, Brancacci Chapel)

A halo (from Ancient Greek ἅλως, hálōs, 'threshing floor, disk'), also called a nimbus, aureole, glory or gloriole (Latin: gloriola, lit. 'little glory'), is a crown of light rays, circle or disk of light that surrounds a person in works of art. The halo occurs in the iconography of many religions to indicate holy or sacred figures, and has at various periods also been used in images of rulers and heroes. In the religious art of Ancient Greece, Ancient Rome, Christianity, Hinduism, and Buddhism (among other religions), sacred people may be depicted with a halo in the form of a circular glow, or flames in Asian art, around the head or around the whole body—this last form is often called a mandorla.

Halos may be shown as almost any colour or combination of colours, but are most often depicted as golden, yellow or white (when representing light) or as red (when representing flames). The earliest artistic depictions of halos were probably in Ancient Egyptian art.

== Ancient Mesopotamia and Persia ==
Sumerian religious literature frequently speaks of melam (melammu in Akkadian), a "brilliant, visible glamour which is exuded by gods, heroes, sometimes by kings, and also by temples of great holiness and by gods' symbols and emblems."

Persian mythology, and later Zoroastrian philosophy, speaks of the similar concept of Khvarenah (later farrah), a divine, radiant power that sanctified a king and his reign. It was most often depicted as a phoenix-like bird, the Simurgh.

== Ancient Greek world ==
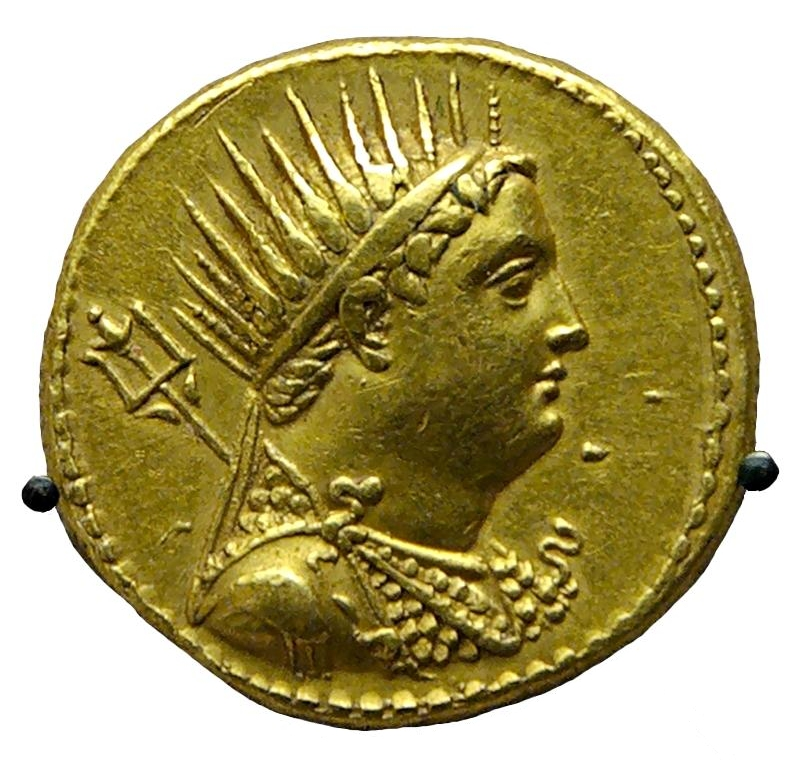
Octadrachm of Ptolemy III

Homer describes a more-than-natural light around the heads of heroes in battle. Depictions of Perseus in the act of slaying Medusa, with lines radiating from his head, appear on a white-ground toiletry box and on a slightly later red-figured vase in the style of Polygnotos, c. 450–30 BC. On painted wares from south Italy, radiant lines or simple haloes appear on a range of mythic figures: Lyssa, a personification of madness; a sphinx; a sea demon; and Thetis, the sea-nymph who was mother to Achilles. The Colossus of Rhodes was a statue of the sun-god Helios and had his usual radiate crown (copied for the Statue of Liberty). Hellenistic rulers are often shown wearing radiate crowns that seem clearly to imitate this effect.

== Asian art ==
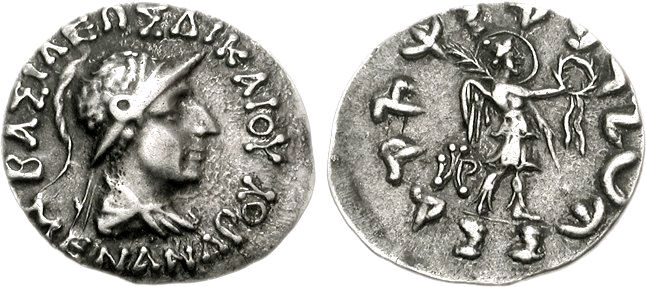
Coin of Indo-Greek king Menander II (90–85 BCE), displaying Nike with a halo on the reverse

In India, the use of halo might date back to the second half of the second millennium BC. Two figures appliqued on a pottery vase fragment from Daimabad's Malwa phase (1600–1400 BC) have been interpreted as a holy figure resembling the later Hindu god Shiva and an attendant, both with halos surrounding their heads, Aureola have been widely used in Indian art, particularly in Buddhist iconography where it has appeared since at least the 1st century AD; the Kushan Bimaran casket in the British Museum is dated 60 AD (at least between 30BC and 200 AD). The rulers of the Kushan Empire were perhaps the earliest to give themselves haloes on their coins, and the nimbus in art may have originated in Central Asia and spread both east and west.

In Chinese and Japanese Buddhist art, the halo has also been used since the earliest periods in depicting the image of Amitabha Buddha and others. Tibetan Buddhism uses haloes and aureoles of many types, drawing from both Indian and Chinese traditions, extensively in statues and Thangka paintings of Buddhist saints such as Milarepa and Padmasambhava and deities. Different coloured haloes have specific meanings: orange for monks, green for the Buddha and other more elevated beings, and commonly figures have both a halo for the head, and another circular one for the body, the two often intersecting somewhere around the head or neck. Thin lines of gold often radiate outwards or inwards from the rim of the halo, and sometimes a whole halo is made up of these.

In India the head halo is called Prabhamandala or Siras-cakra, while the full body halo is Prabhavali. Elaborate haloes and especially aureoles also appear in Hindu sculpture, where they tend to develop into architectural frames in which the original idea can be hard to recognise. Theravada Buddhism and Jainism did not use the halo for many centuries, but later adopted it, though less thoroughly than other religious groups.

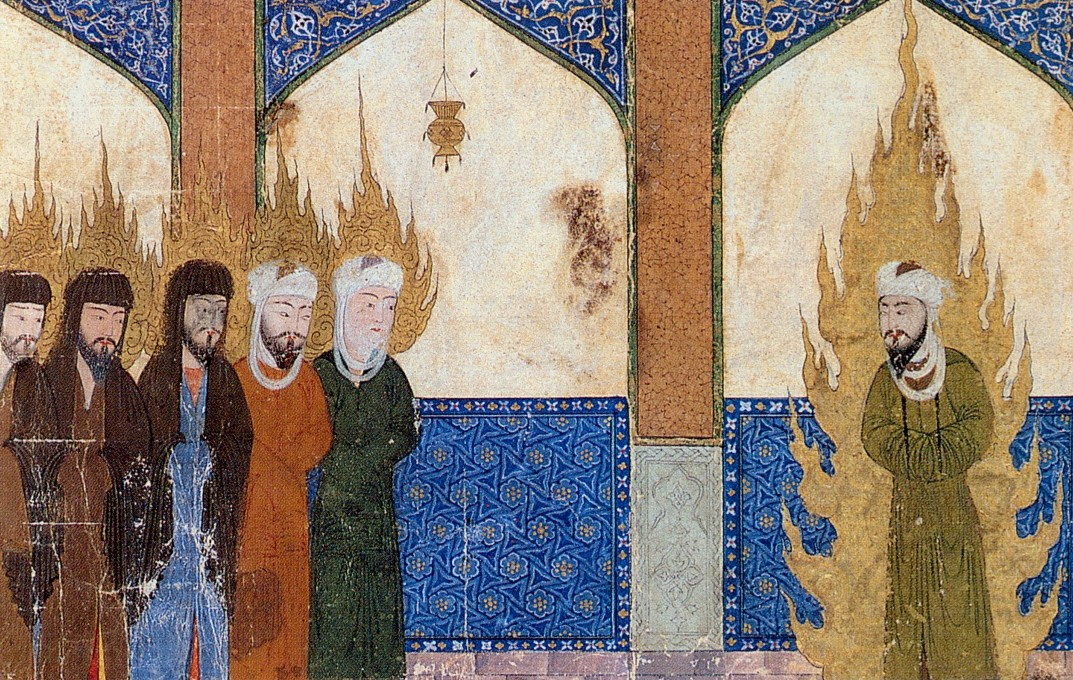
Muhammad leads Abraham, Moses, Jesus and others in prayer. Persian miniature, 15th century

In Asian art, the nimbus is often imagined as consisting not just of light, but of flames. This type seems to first appear on the sculpture of fire-deity Agnipani dated to 100 BCE, which has a flame-shaped aureole with incised tongues of flames behind his head. In Chinese bronzes, the earliest surviving examples date from before 450. The depiction of the flames may be very formalized, as in the regular little flames on the ring aureole surrounding many Chola bronzes and other classic Hindu sculptures of divinities, or very prominent, as with the more realistic flames, and sometimes smoke, shown rising to a peak behind many Tibetan Buddhist depictions of the "wrathful aspect" of divinities, and also in Persian miniatures of the classic period. Sometimes a thin line of flames rise up from the edges of a circular halo in Buddhist examples. In Tibetan paintings the flames are often shown as blown by a wind, usually from left to right. This type is also very rarely found, and on a smaller scale, in medieval Christian art.

Halos are found in Islamic art from various places and periods, especially in Persian miniatures and Moghul and Ottoman art influenced by them. Flaming halos derived from Buddhist art surround angels, and similar ones are often seen around Muhammad and other sacred human figures. From the early 17th century, plainer round haloes appear in portraits of Mughal Emperors and subsequently Rajput and Sikh rulers; despite the more local precedents art historians believe the Mughals took the motif from European religious art, though it expresses a Persian idea of the God-given charisma of kingship that is far older. The Ottomans avoided using halos for the sultans, despite their title as Caliph, and they are only seen on Chinese emperors if they are posing as Buddhist religious figures, as some felt entitled to do.

=== Egypt and Asia ===
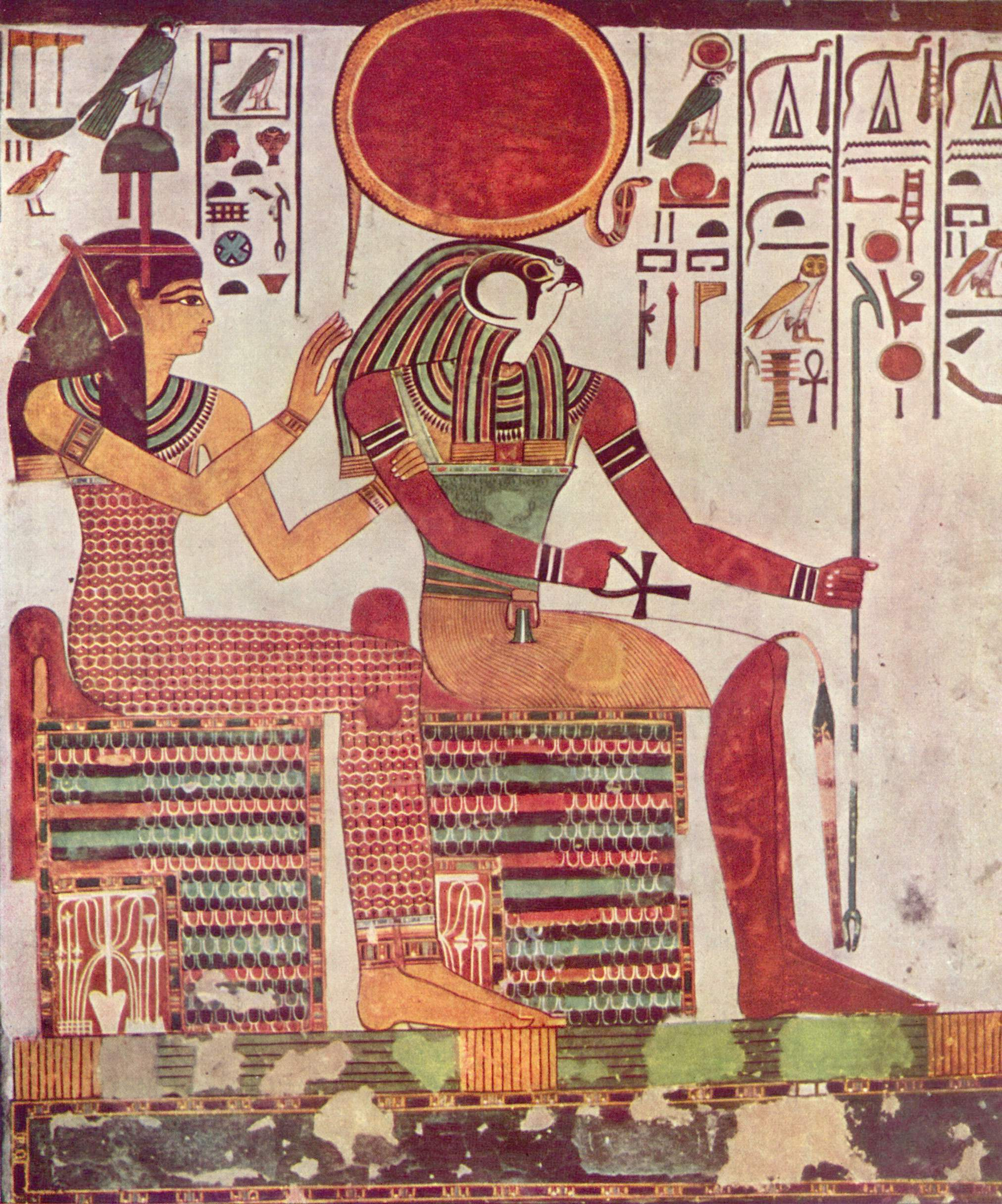
Ra with solar disc, before 1235 BC

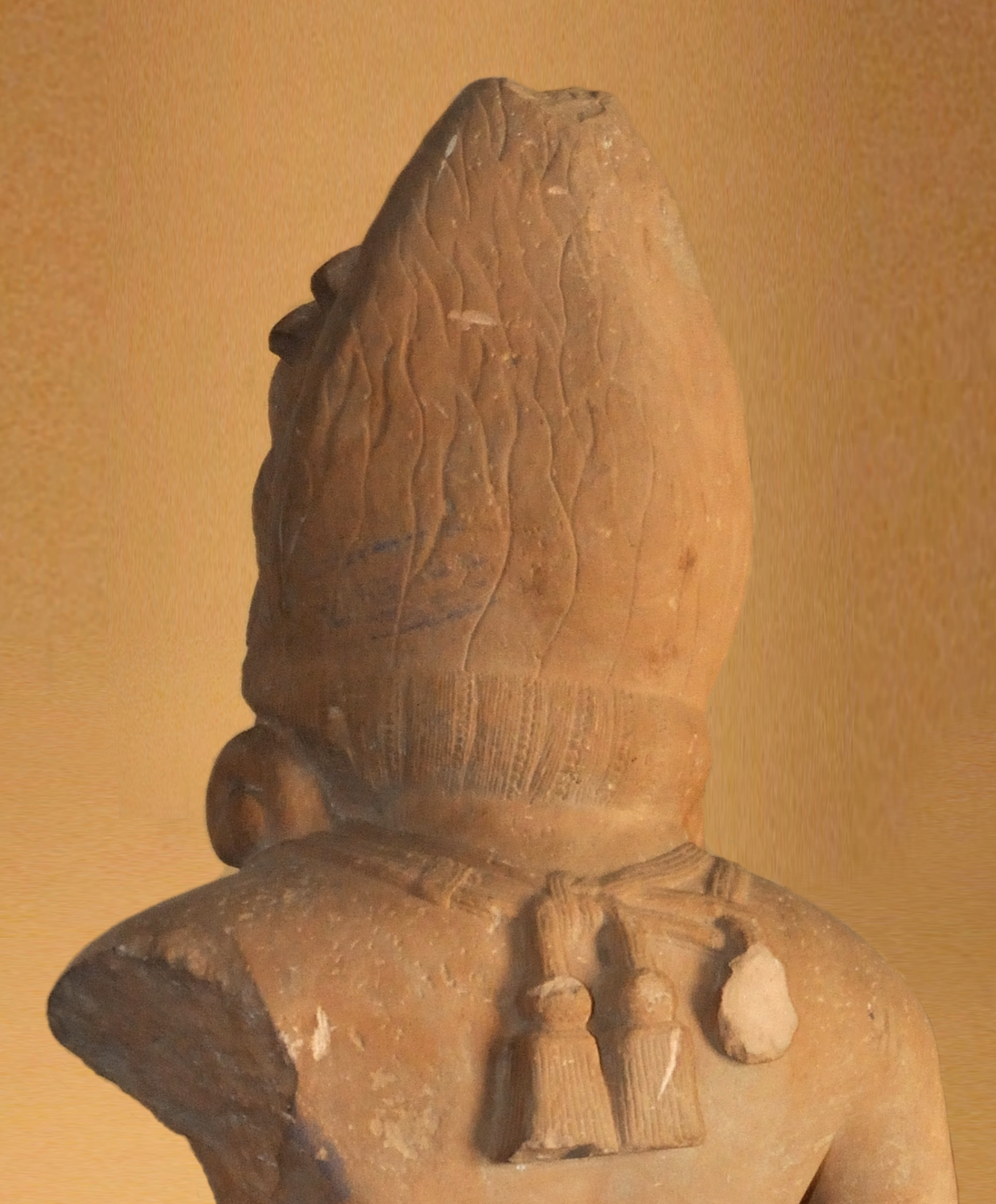
Agnipani fire-deity with flame-shaped aureole with incised tongues of flames, 100 BCE

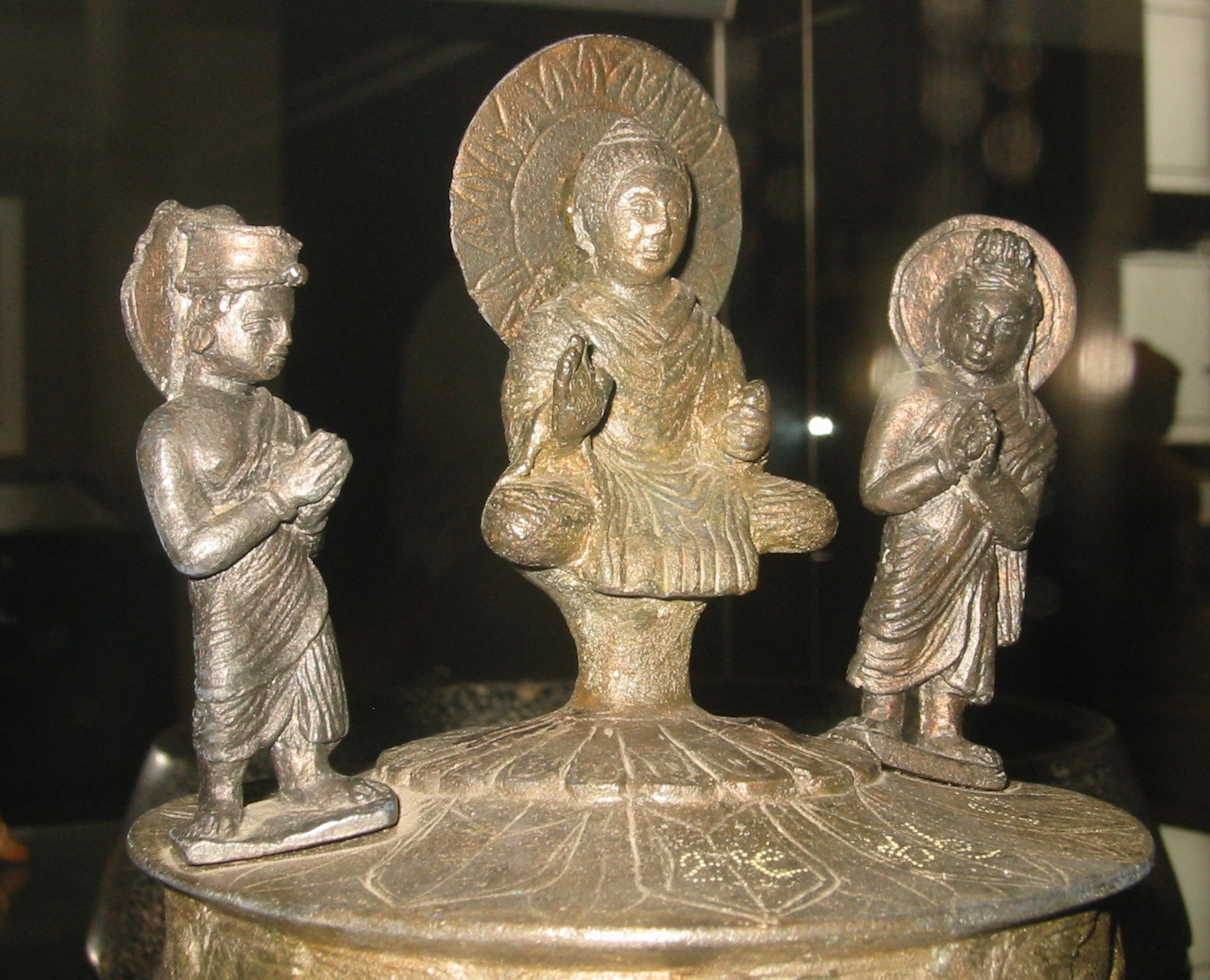
The Kushan Kanishka casket of 127, with (left to right) Brahma, the Buddha and Indra

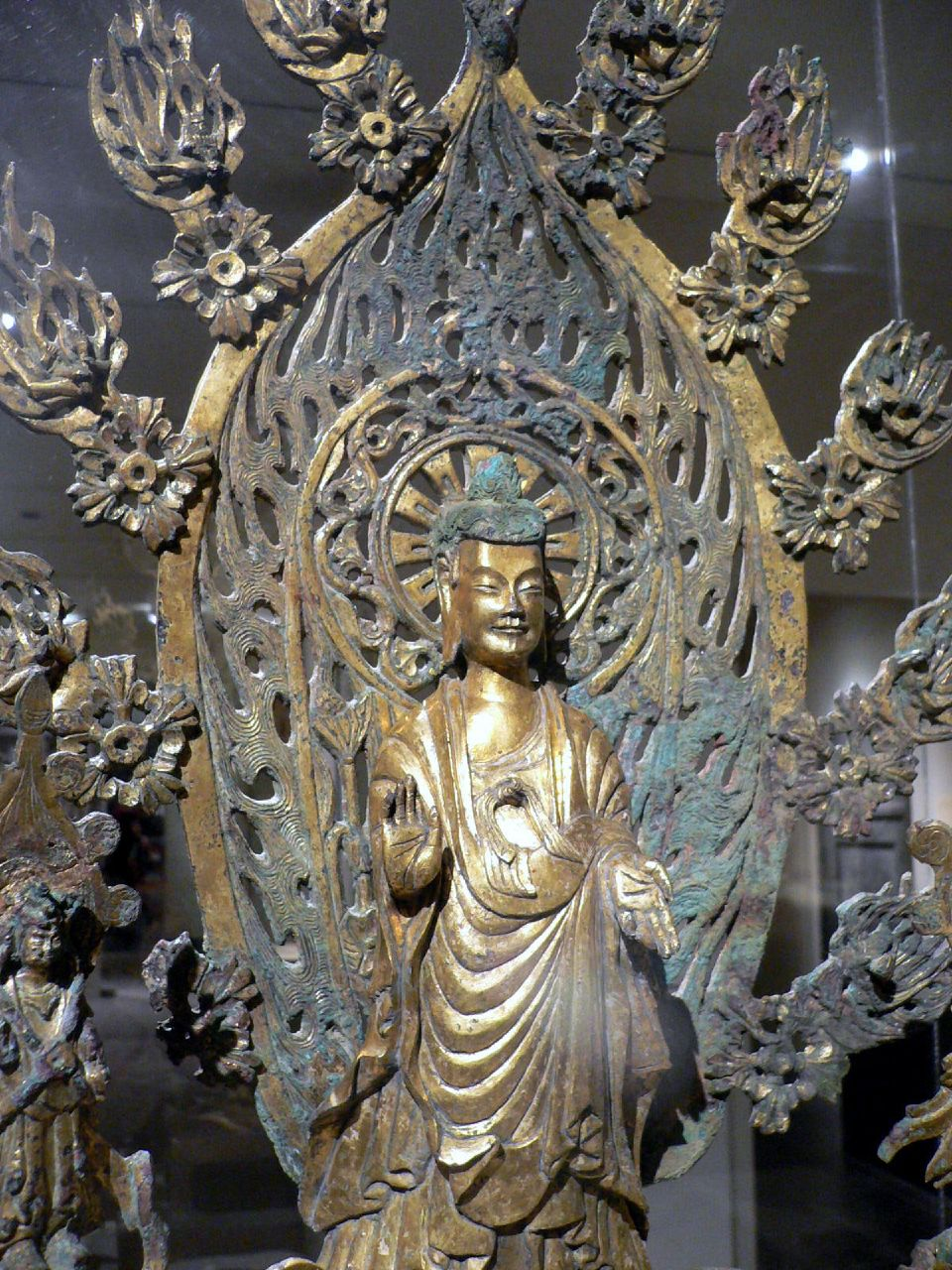
Northern Wei Buddhist bronze, 524, with two-ringed halo within a flaming mandorla

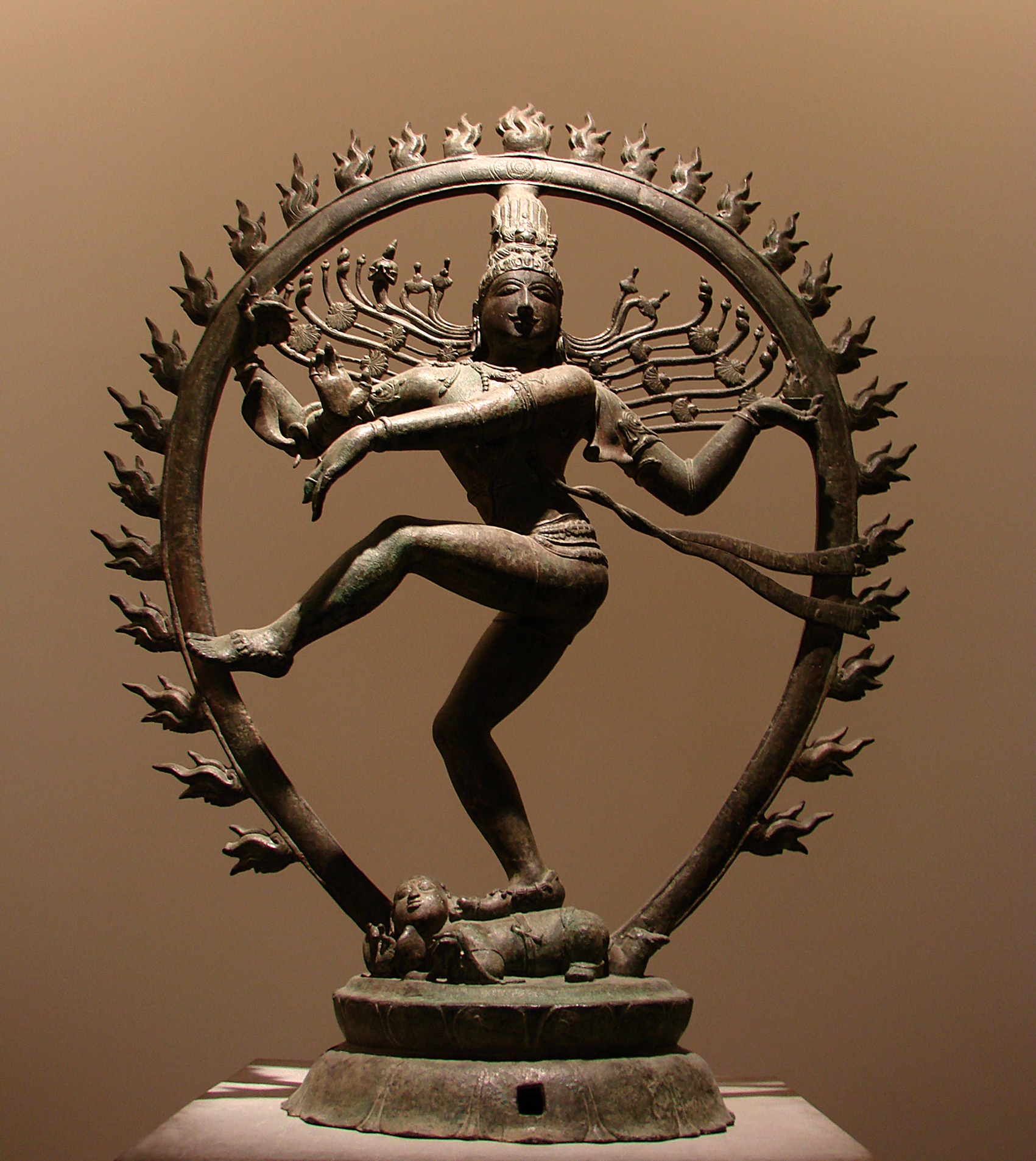
Chola Nataraja with an aureole of flames (11th century)

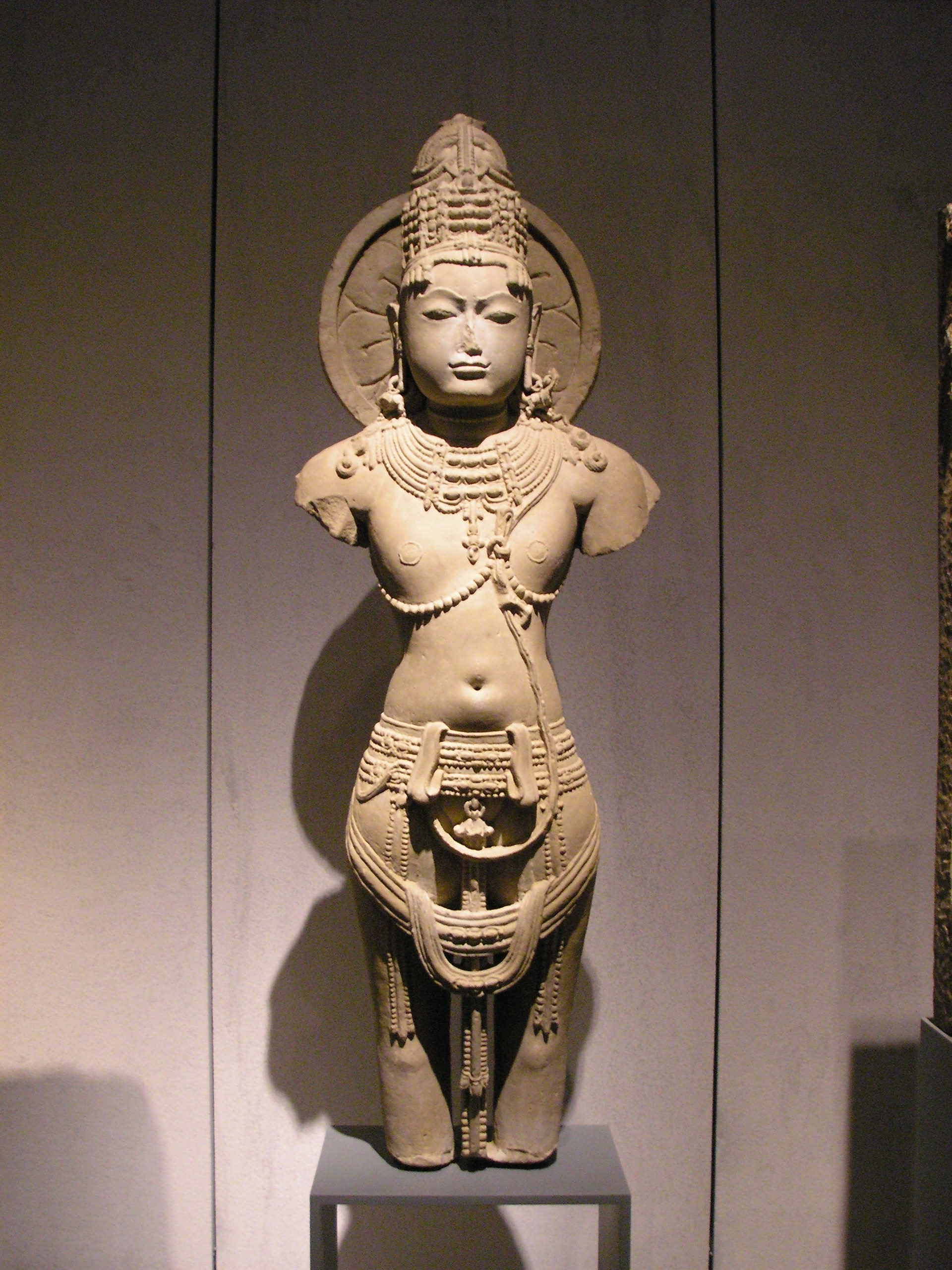
Hindu figure (11th century)

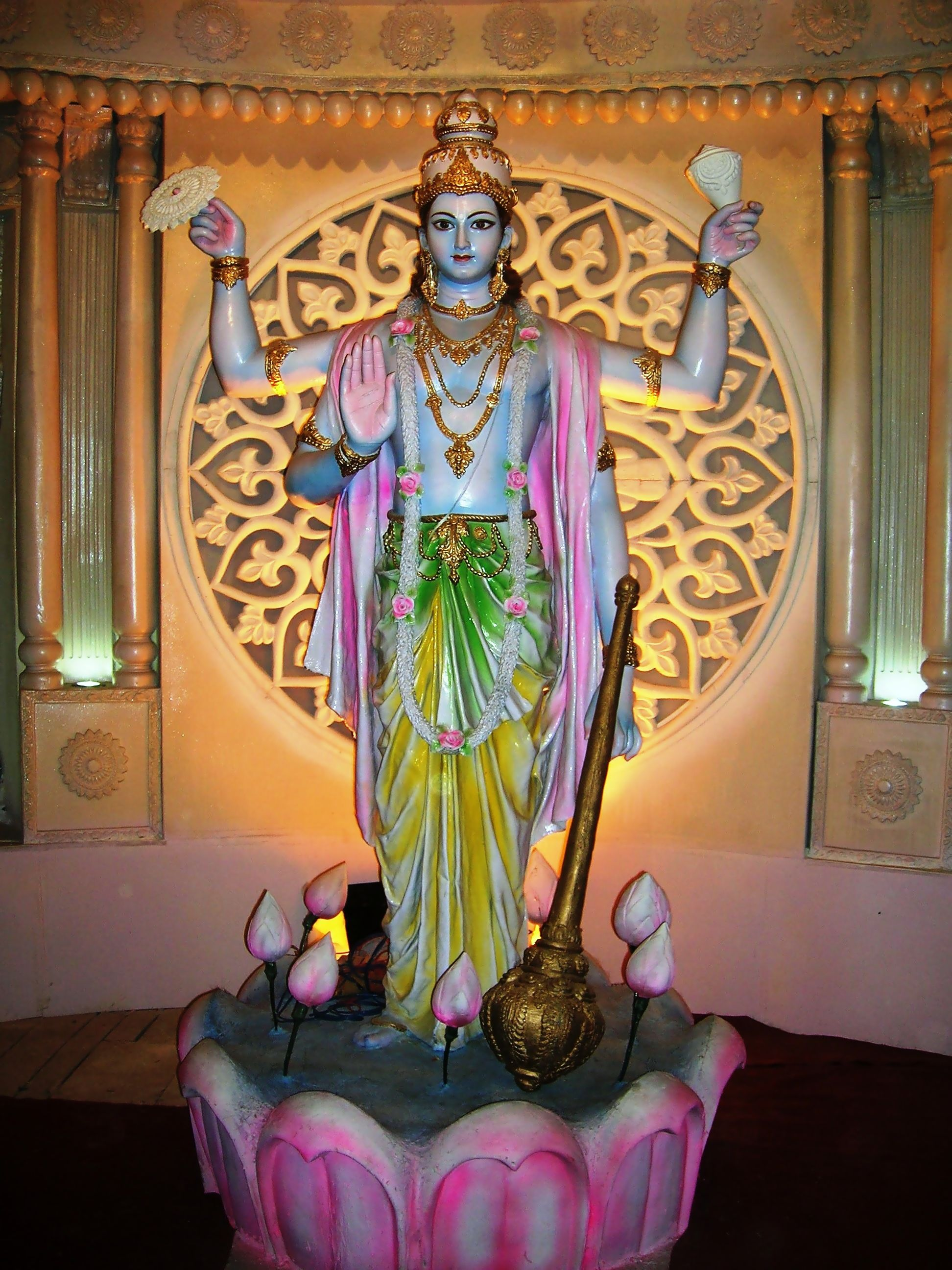
Modern murti of Vishnu, with halo created by lighting

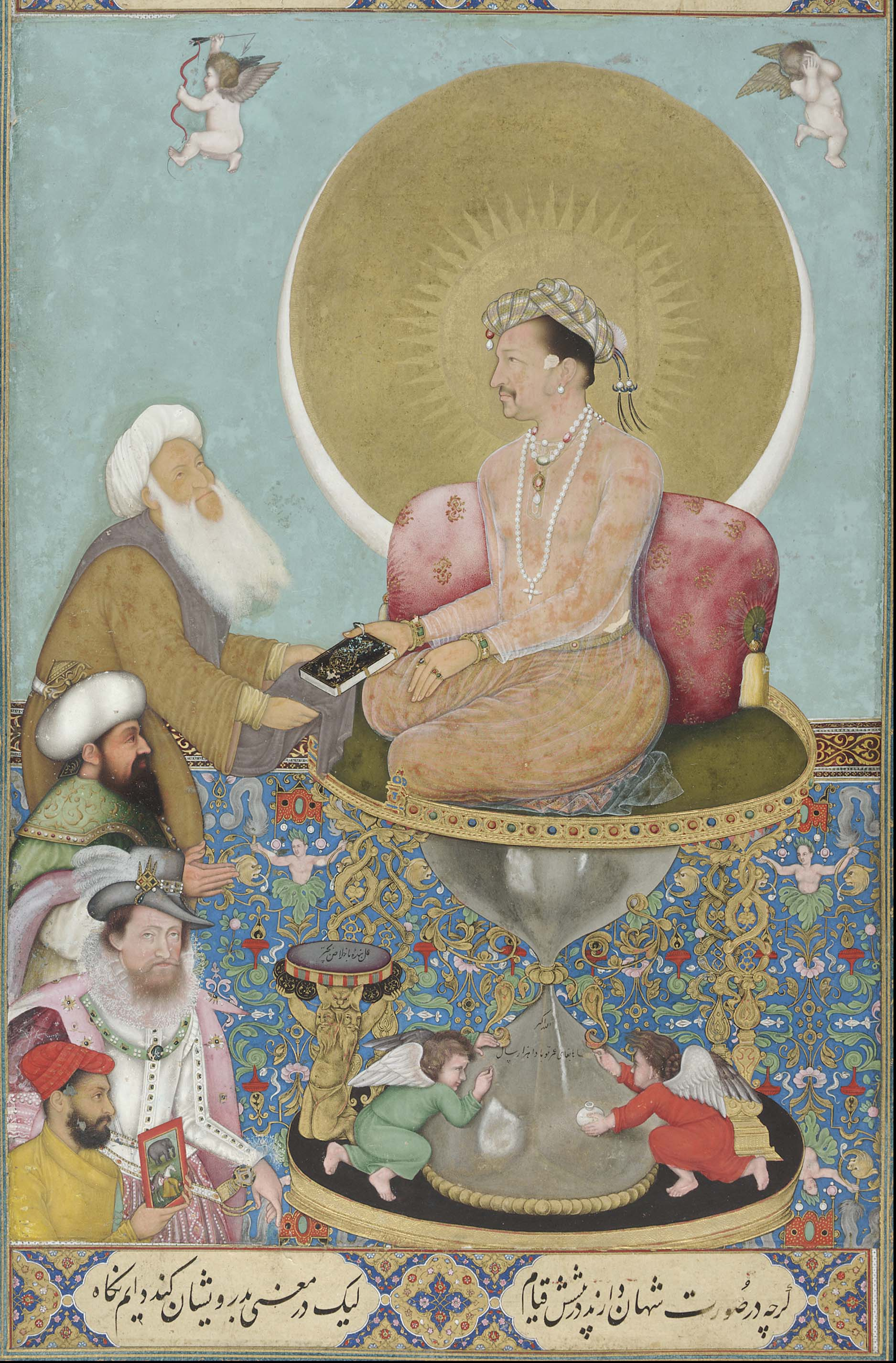
The Mughal emperor Jahangir often had himself depicted with a halo of unprecedented size. c. 1620.

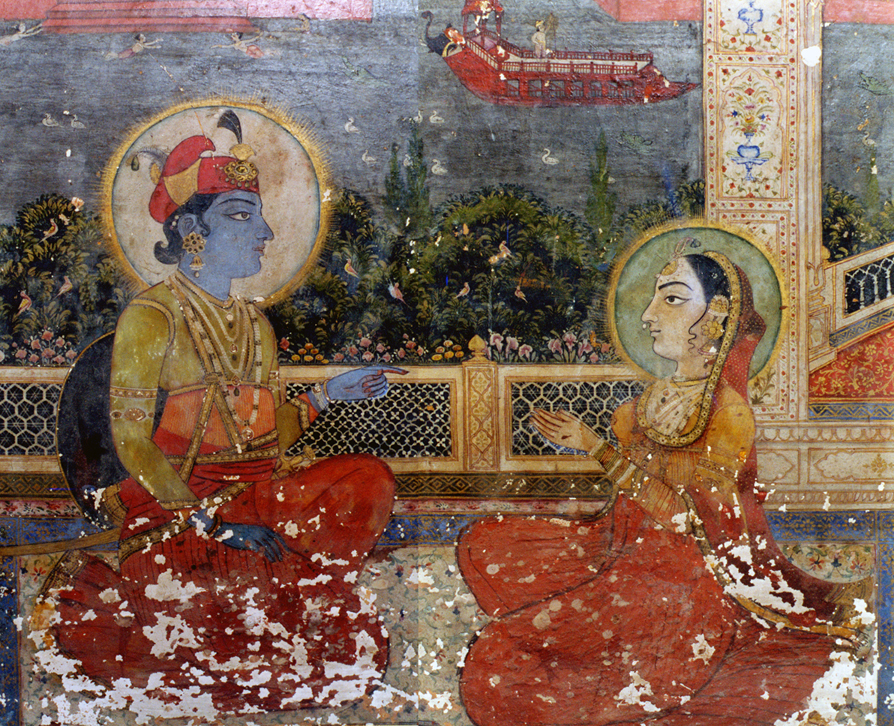
Krishna and his consort Rukmini, mural, 1840s

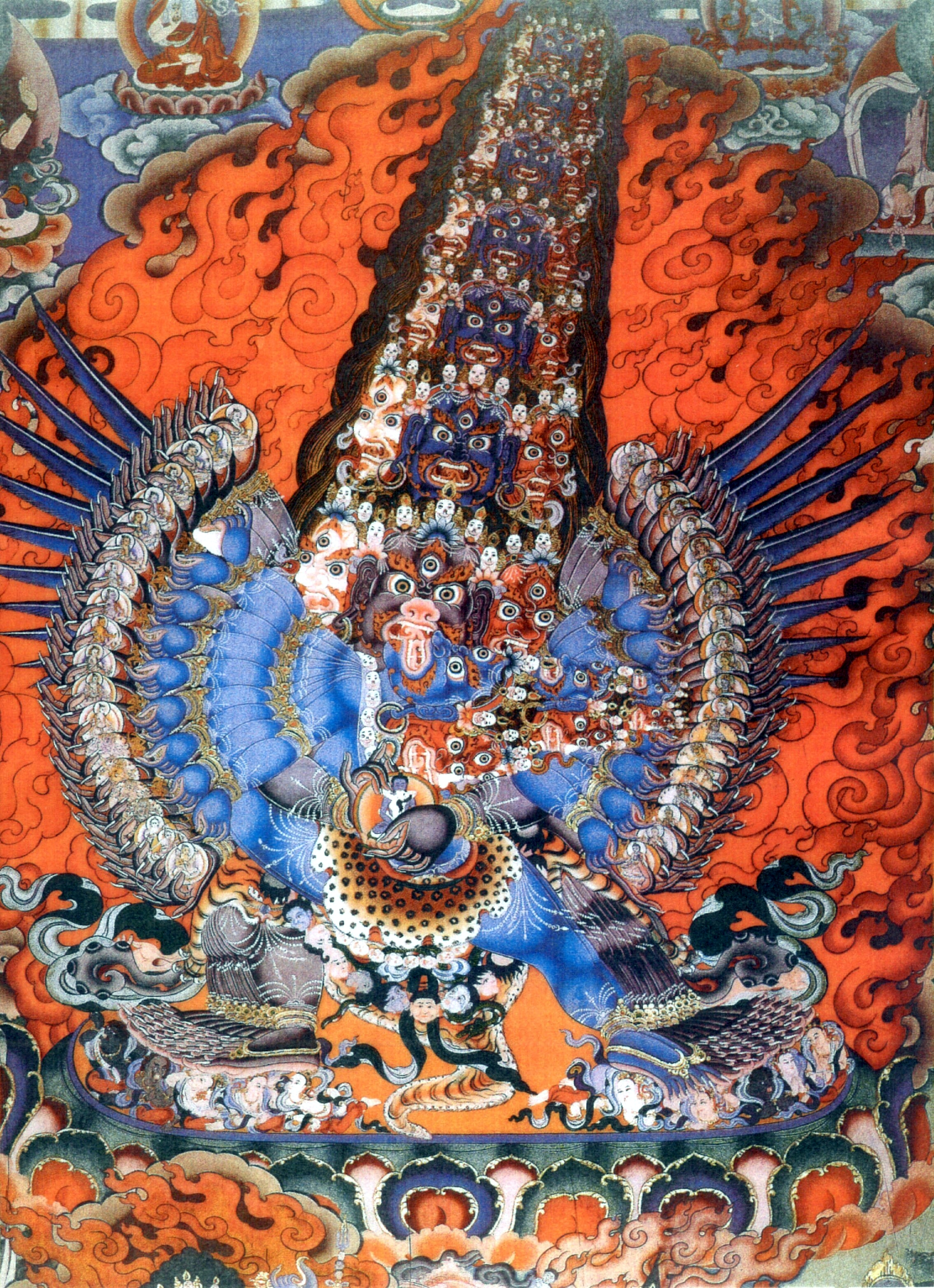
A multi-limbed Tibetan deity surrounded by an aureole of billowing fire and a pillar of smoke which signifies the wrathful nature of the deity (19th century) (Thangka of the Hayagriva).

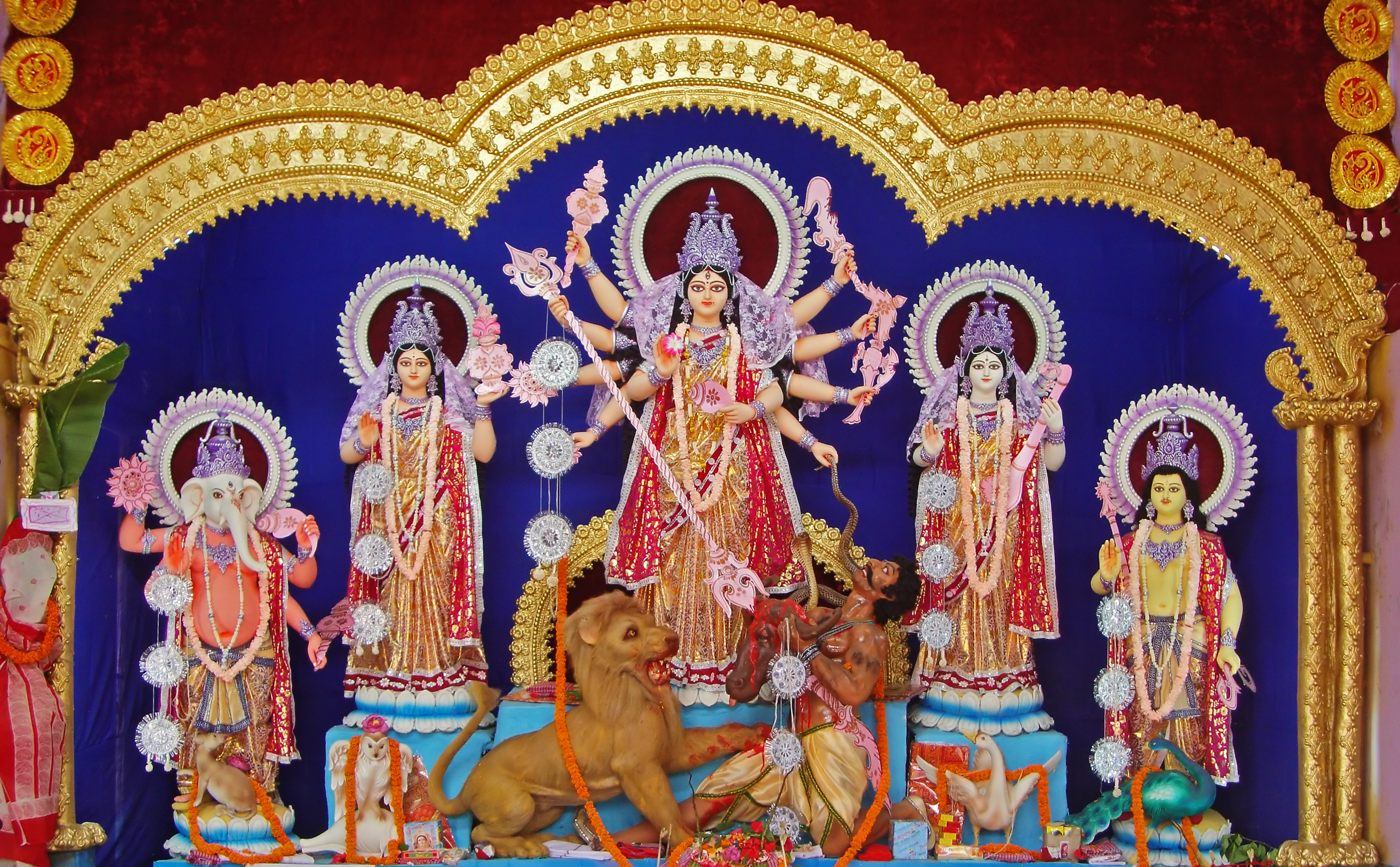
Modern Hindu devotional images of Durga and other haloed deities

== Roman art ==
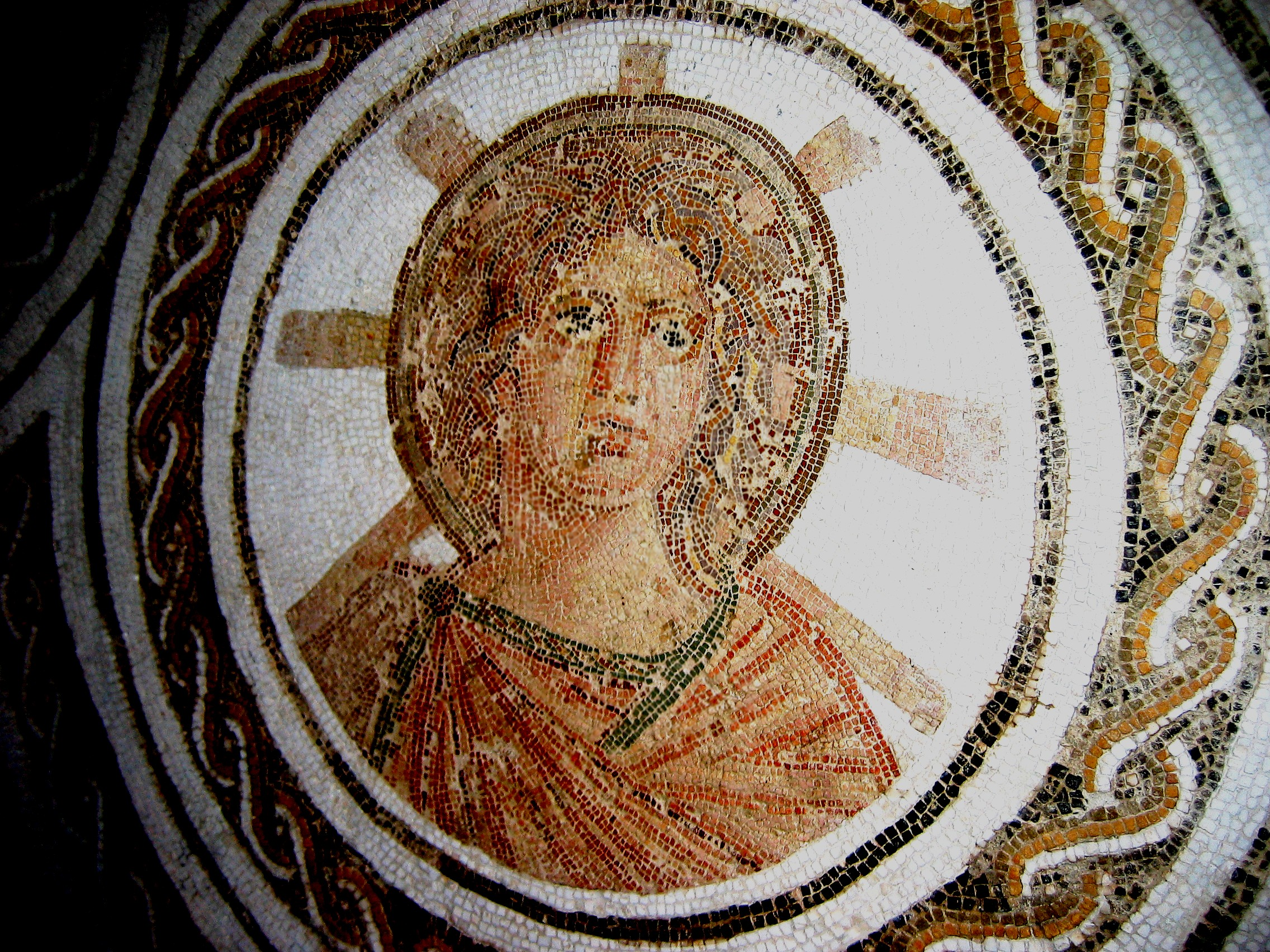
Apollo with a radiant halo in a Roman floor mosaic (late 2nd century, El Djem, Tunisia)

The halo represents an aura or the glow of sanctity which was conventionally drawn encircling the head. It first appeared in the culture of Hellenistic Greece and Rome, possibly related to the Zoroastrian hvarena – "glory" or "divine lustre" – which marked the Persian kings, and may have been imported with Mithraism. Though Roman paintings have largely disappeared, save some fresco decorations, the haloed figure remains fresh in Roman mosaics. In a 2nd-century AD Roman floor mosaic preserved at Bardo, Tunisia, a haloed Poseidon appears in his chariot drawn by hippocamps. Significantly, the triton and nereid who accompany the sea-god are not haloed.

In a late 2nd century AD floor mosaic from Thysdrus, El Djem, (illustration) Apollo Helios is identified by his effulgent halo. Another haloed Apollo in mosaic, from Hadrumentum, is in the museum at Sousse. The conventions of this representation, head tilted, lips slightly parted, large-eyed, curling hair cut in locks grazing the neck, were developed in the 3rd century BC to depict Alexander the Great (Bieber 1964; Yalouris 1980). Sometime after this mosaic was executed, the Emperor began to be depicted with a halo, which was not abandoned when they became Christian; initially Christ only had one when shown on a throne as Christ in Majesty.

== Christian art ==
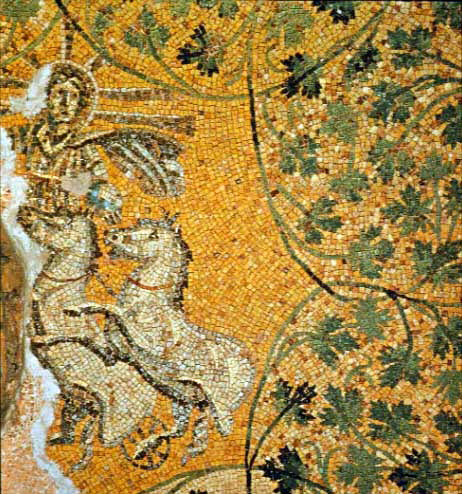
Early pre-4th century Mosaic of Sol Invictus in Mausoleum M in the pre-4th-century necropolis beneath St Peter's Basilica – interpreted by many as representing Christ

The halo was incorporated into Early Christian art sometime in the 4th century with the earliest iconic images of Christ, initially the only figure shown with one (together with his symbol, the Lamb of God). Initially the halo was regarded by many as a representation of the Logos of Christ, his divine nature, and therefore in very early (before 500) depictions of Christ before his Baptism by John he tends not to be shown with a halo, it being a matter of debate whether his Logos was innate from conception (the Catholic/Lutheran/Orthodox view), or acquired at Baptism (the Adoptionist view). At this period he is also shown as a child or youth in Baptisms, though this may be a hieratic rather than an age-related representation.

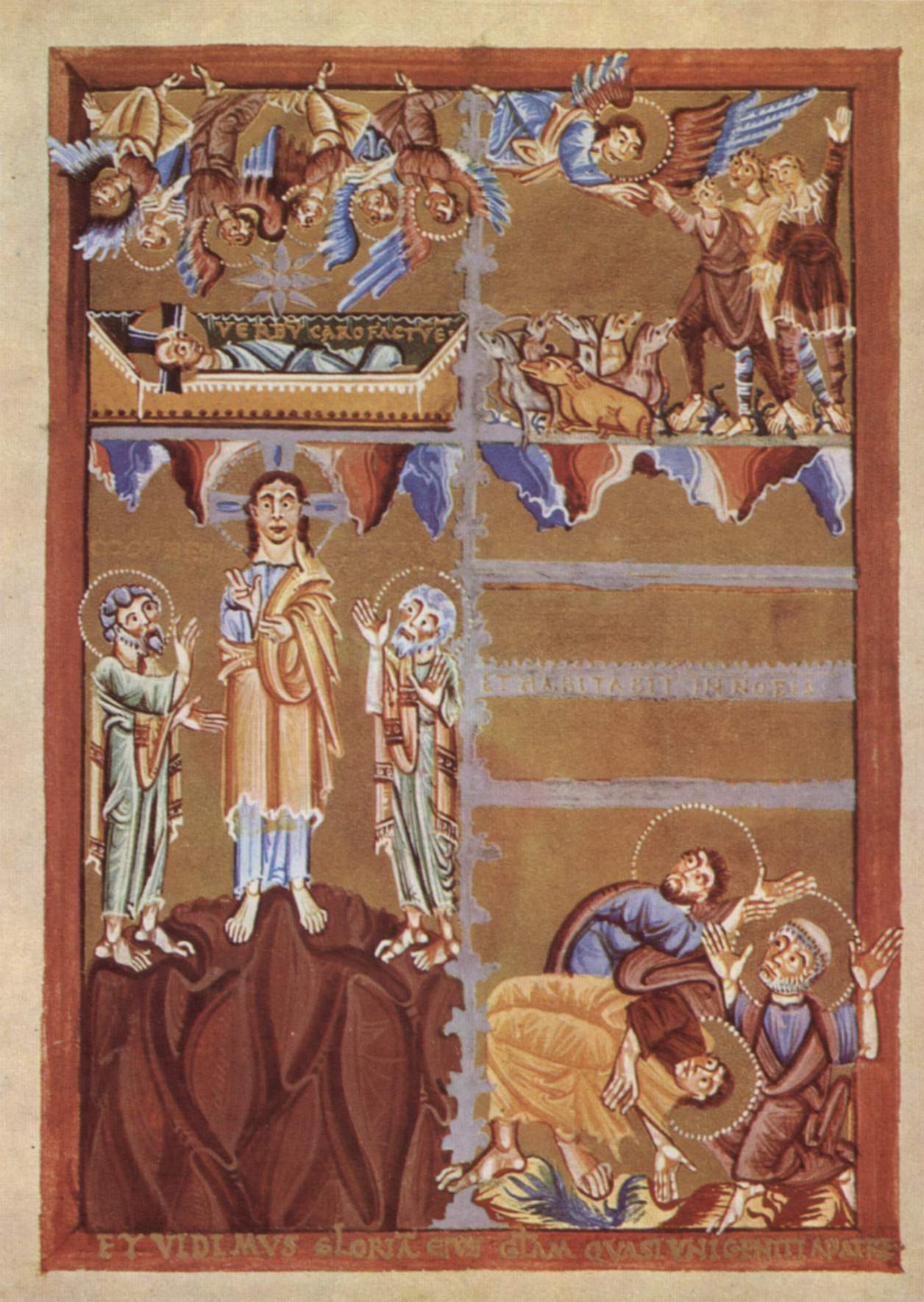
Nativity and Transfiguration of Christ, with cross haloes; the apostles, angels and prophets have plain ones (1025–50, Cologne).

A cruciform halo, that is to say a halo with a cross within, or extending beyond, the circle is used to represent the persons of the Holy Trinity, especially Jesus, and especially in medieval art. In Byzantine and Orthodox images, inside each of the bars of the cross in Christ's halo is one of the Greek letters Ο Ω Ν, making up ὁ ὢν—"ho ōn", literally, "the Existing One"—indicating the divinity of Jesus. At least in later Orthodox images, each bar of this cross is composed of three lines, symbolising the dogmas of the Trinity, the oneness of God and the two natures of Christ.

In mosaics in Santa Maria Maggiore (432–40) the juvenile Christ has a four-armed cross either on top of his head in the radius of the nimbus, or placed above the radius, but this is unusual. In the same mosaics the accompanying angels have haloes (as, in a continuation of the Imperial tradition, does King Herod), but not Mary and Joseph. Occasionally other figures have crossed haloes, such as the seven doves representing the Seven gifts of the Holy Spirit in the 11th century Codex Vyssegradensis Tree of Jesse (where Jesse and Isaiah also have plain haloes, as do the Ancestors of Christ in other miniatures).

Later, triangular haloes are sometimes given to God the Father to represent the Trinity. When he is represented by a hand emerging from a cloud, this may be given a halo.

Plain round haloes are typically used to signify saints, the Virgin Mary, Old Testament prophets, angels, symbols of the Four Evangelists, and some other figures. Byzantine emperors and empresses were often shown with them in compositions including saints or Christ, however the haloes were outlined only. This was copied by Ottonian and later Russian rulers. Old Testament figures become less likely to have haloes in the West as the Middle Ages go on.

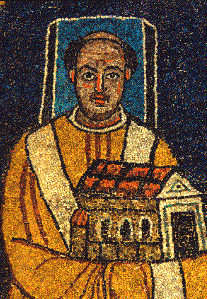
Pope Paschal I is depicted during his lifetime, so with a square halo, c. 820, Santa Prassede, Rome.

Beatified figures, not yet canonised as saints, are sometimes shown in medieval Italian art with linear rays radiating out from the head, but no circular edge of the nimbus defined; later this became a less obtrusive form of halo that could be used for all figures. Mary has, especially from the Baroque period onwards, a special form of halo in a circle of twelve stars, derived from her identification as the Woman of the Apocalypse.

Square haloes were sometimes used for the living in donor portraits of about 500–1100 in Italy. Most surviving ones are of Popes and others in mosaics in Rome, including the Episcopa Theodora head of the mother of the Pope of the day. They seem merely an indication of a contemporary figure, as opposed to the saints usually accompanying them, with no real implication of future canonization. A late example is of Desiderius, Abbot of Monte Cassino, later Pope, from a manuscript of 1056–86; Pope Gregory the Great had himself depicted with one, according to the 9th-century writer of his vita, John, deacon of Rome. A figure who may represent Moses in the 3rd century Dura Europos Synagogue has one, where no round halos are found. Osbert Lancaster notes the presence of square haloes in donor portraits in the 7th-century church of St Demetrios in Thessalonika.

Personifications of the Virtues are sometimes given hexagonal haloes. Scalloped haloes, sometimes just appearing as made of radiating bars, are found in the manuscripts of the Carolingian "Ada School", such as the Ada Gospels.

The whole-body image of radiance is sometimes called the 'aureole' or glory; it is shown radiating from all round the body, most often of Christ or Mary, occasionally of saints (especially those reported to have been seen surrounded by one). Such an aureola is often a mandorla ("almond-shaped" vesica piscis), especially around Christ in Majesty, who may well have a halo as well. In depictions of the Transfiguration of Jesus a more complicated shape is often seen, especially in the Eastern Orthodox tradition, as in the famous 15th century icon in the Tretyakov Gallery in Moscow.

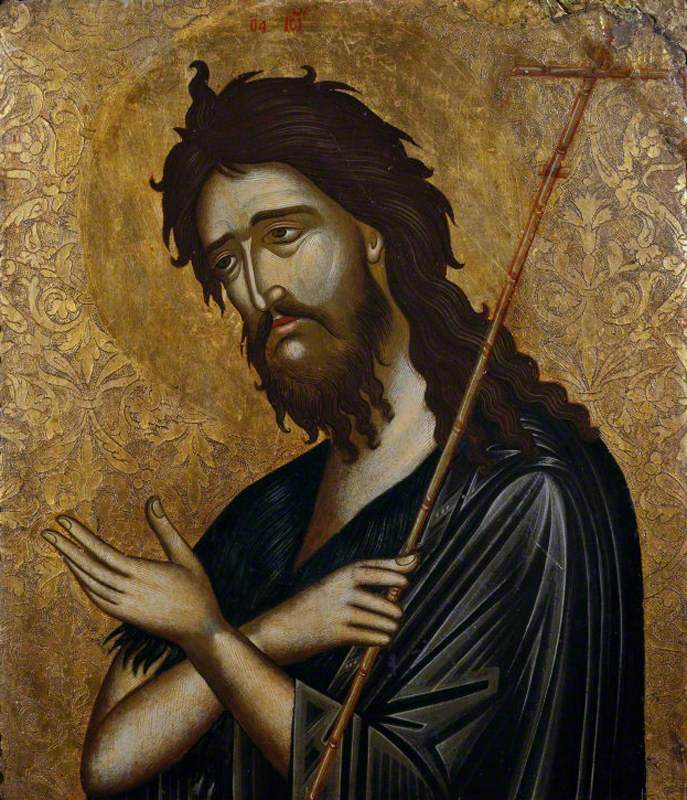
St. John the Baptist pictured with a halo. In Christian iconography, saints may also be depicted with wreaths, palm branches, white lilies or other attributes.

Where gold is used as a background in miniatures, mosaics and panel paintings, the halo is often formed by inscribing lines in the gold leaf, and may be decorated in patterns (diapering) within the outer radius, and thus becomes much less prominent. The gold leaf inside the halo may also be burnished in a circular manner, so as to produce the effect of light radiating out from the subject's head. In the early centuries of its use, the Christian halo may be in most colours (though black is reserved for Judas, Satan and other evil figures) or multicoloured; later gold becomes standard, and if the entire background is not gold leaf, the halo itself usually will be.

=== Decline of the halo ===
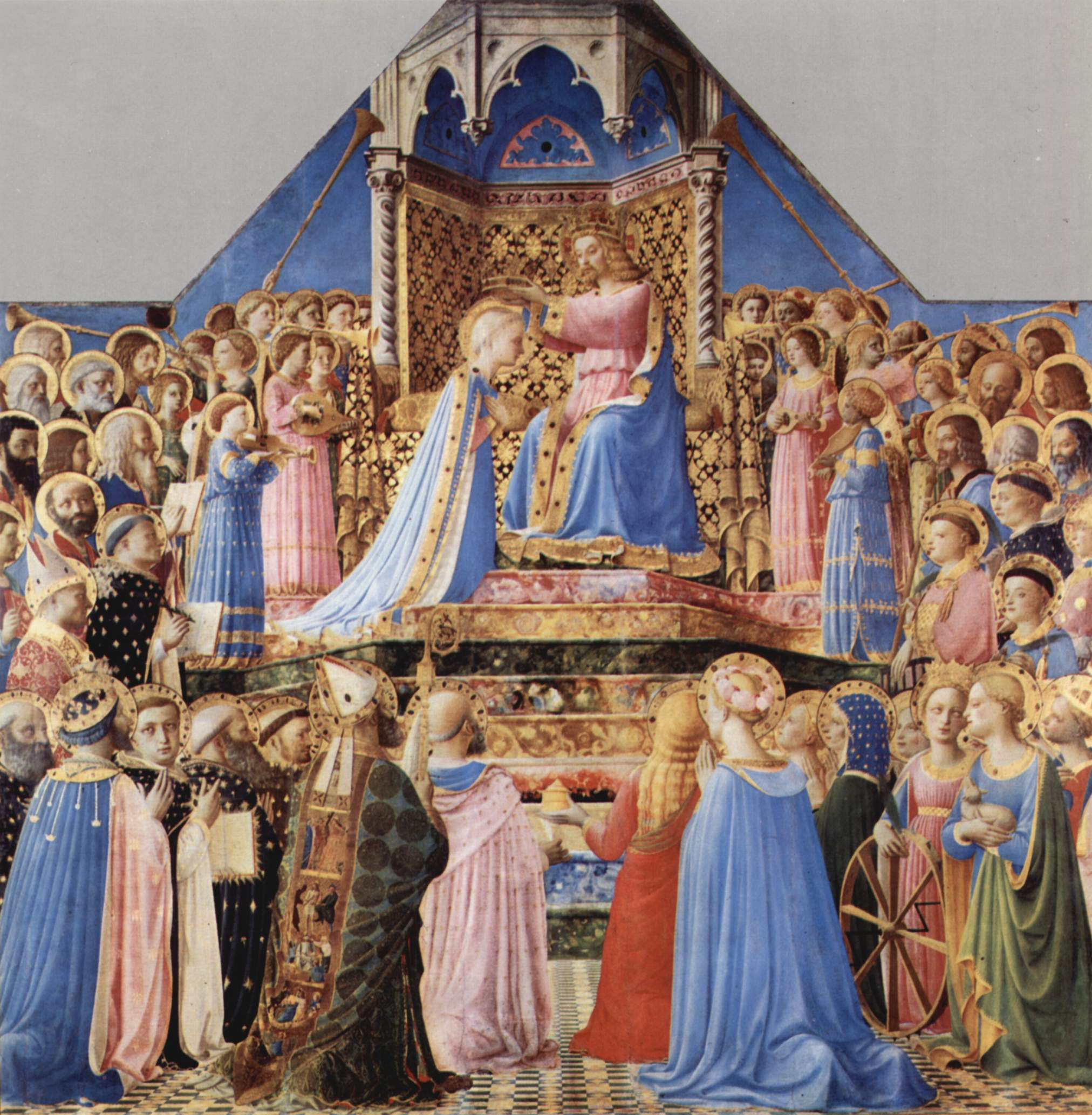
Fra Angelico. Coronation of the Virgin. The haloes of the kneeling figures at the front are seen from behind.

With increasing realism in painting, the halo came to be a problem for artists. So long as they continued to use the old compositional formulae which had been worked out to accommodate haloes, the problems were manageable, but as Western artists sought more flexibility in composition, this ceased to be the case. In free-standing medieval sculpture, the halo was already shown as a flat disk above or behind the head. When perspective came to be considered essential, painters also changed the halo from an aura surrounding the head, always depicted as though seen full-on, to a flat golden disk or ring that appeared in perspective, floating above the heads of the saints, or vertically behind, sometimes transparent. This can be seen first in Giotto, who still gives Christ the cruciform halo which began to be phased out by his successors. In northern Europe the radiant halo, made up of rays like a sunburst, came into fashion in French painting around the end of the 14th century.

In the early 15th century Jan van Eyck and Robert Campin largely abandoned their use, although some other Early Netherlandish artists continued to use them. In Italy at around the same time, Pisanello used them if they did not clash with one of the enormous hats he liked to paint. Generally they lasted longer in Italy, although often reduced to a thin gold band depicting the outer edge of the nimbus, usual for example in Giovanni Bellini. Christ began to be shown with a plain halo.

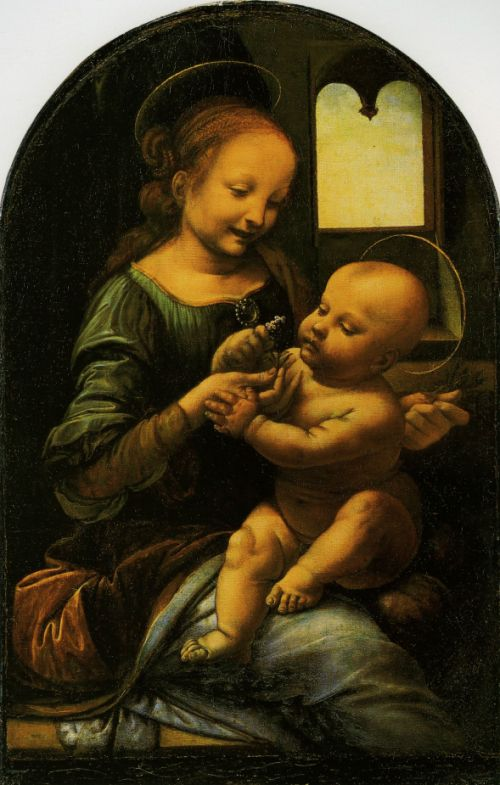
Leonardo da Vinci (attributed), Benois Madonna. Floating semi-transparent haloes in perspective.

Fra Angelico, himself a monk, was a conservative as far as haloes are concerned, and some of his paintings demonstrate the problems well, as in several of his more crowded compositions, where they are shown as solid gold disks on the same plane as the picture surface, it becomes difficult to prevent them obstructing other figures. At the same time they were useful in crowded narrative scenes for distinguishing the main, identifiable, figures from the mass of a crowd. Giotto's Lamentation of Christ from the Scrovegni Chapel has eight figures with haloes and ten without, to whom the viewer knows they are not meant to attach a specific identity. In the same way, a Baptism of Christ by Perugino in Vienna gives neither Christ nor John the Baptist haloes, as sufficiently recognisable without them, but a saint in the background, not usually present in this scene, has a ring halo to denote his status.

In the High Renaissance, even most Italian painters dispensed with haloes altogether, but in the Church's reaction to the Protestant Reformation, that culminated in the decrees on images of the Council of Trent of 1563, their use was mandated by clerical writers on religious art such as Molanus and Saint Carlo Borromeo. Figures were placed where natural light sources would highlight their heads, or instead more discreet quasi-naturalistic flickering or glowing light was shown around the head of Christ and other figures (perhaps pioneered by Titian in his late period). Rembrandt's etchings, for example, show a variety of solutions of all of these types, as well as a majority with no halo effect at all. The disk halo was rarely used for figures from classical mythology in the Renaissance, although they are sometimes seen, especially in the classical radiant form, in Mannerist and Baroque art.

By the 19th century haloes had become unusual in Western mainstream art, although retained in iconic and popular images, and sometimes as a medievalising effect. When John Millais gives his otherwise realist St Stephen (1895) a ring halo, it seems rather surprising. In popular graphic culture, a simple ring has become the predominant representation of a halo since at least the late 19th century, as seen for example in the logo for the Simon Templar ("The Saint") series of novels and other adaptations.

== Origins and usage of the different terms ==
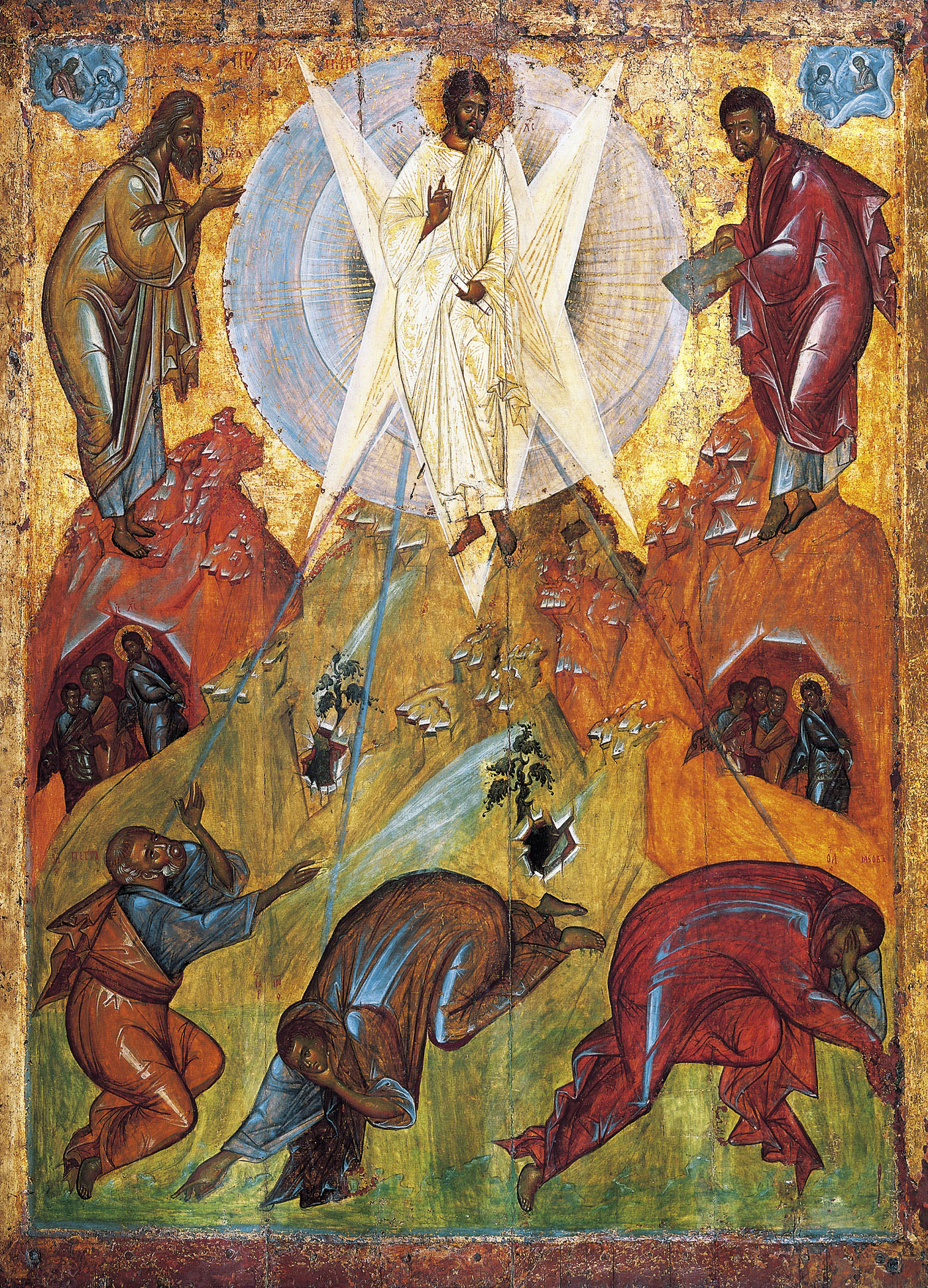
Late Byzantine/Russian icon of the Transfiguration. Christ is shown surrounded by a light blue aureole with white flashes of lightning (15th century, attributed to Theophanes the Greek, Tretyakov Gallery, Moscow).

The distinction between the alternative terms used in English for various types of halo is rather unclear. The oldest term in English is "glory", the only one available in the Middle Ages, but now largely obsolete. It came from the French gloire which has much the same range of meanings as "glory". "Gloriole" does not appear in this sense until 1844, being a modern invention, as a diminutive, in French also. "Halo" is first found in English in this sense in 1646 (nearly a century after the optical or astronomical sense). Both "halos" and "haloes" may be used as plural forms, and halo may be used as a verb. Halo comes originally from the Greek for "threshing-floor" – a circular, slightly sloping area kept very clean, around which slaves or oxen walked to thresh the grain. In Greek, this came to mean a divine, bright disk.

Nimbus means "a cloud" in Latin, and is found as "a divine cloud" in 1616, whereas as "a bright or golden disk surrounding the head" it does not appear until 1727. The plural nimbi is correct but "rare"; "nimbuses" is not in the OED but sometimes used. Nimb is an obsolete form of the noun, but not a verb, except that the obsolete "nimbated", like the commoner "nimbate", means "furnished with a nimbus". It is sometimes preferred by art-historians, as sounding more technical than halo.

Aureole, from the Latin for "golden", has been used in English as a term for a gold crown, especially that traditionally considered the reward of martyrs, since the Middle Ages (OED 1220). However, the first use recorded as a term for a halo is in 1848, very shortly after which matters were greatly complicated by the publication in 1851 of the English translation of Adolphe Napoléon Didron's important Christian Iconography: Or, The History of Christian Art in the Middle Ages. This, by what the OED calls a "strange blunder", derived the word from the Latin aura as a diminutive, and also defined it as meaning a halo or glory covering the whole body, whilst saying that "nimbus" referred only to a halo around the head. This, according to the OED, reversed the historical usage of both words, but whilst Didron's diktat was "not accepted in France", the OED noted it had already been picked up by several English dictionaries, and influenced usage in English, which still seems to be the case, as the word "nimbus" is mostly found describing whole-body haloes, and seems to have also influenced "gloriole" in the same direction.

The only English term that unequivocally means a full-body halo, and cannot be used for a circular disk around the head is "mandorla", first occurring in 1883. However, this term, which is the Italian word for "almond", is usually reserved for the vesica piscis shape, at least in describing Christian art. In discussing Asian art, it is used more widely. Otherwise, there could be said to be an excess of words that could refer to either a head-disk or a full-body halo, and no word that clearly denotes a full-body halo that is not vesica piscis shaped. "Halo" by itself, according to recent dictionaries, means only a circle around the head, although Rhie and Thurman use the word also for circular full-body aureoles.

== Spiritual significance in Christianity ==
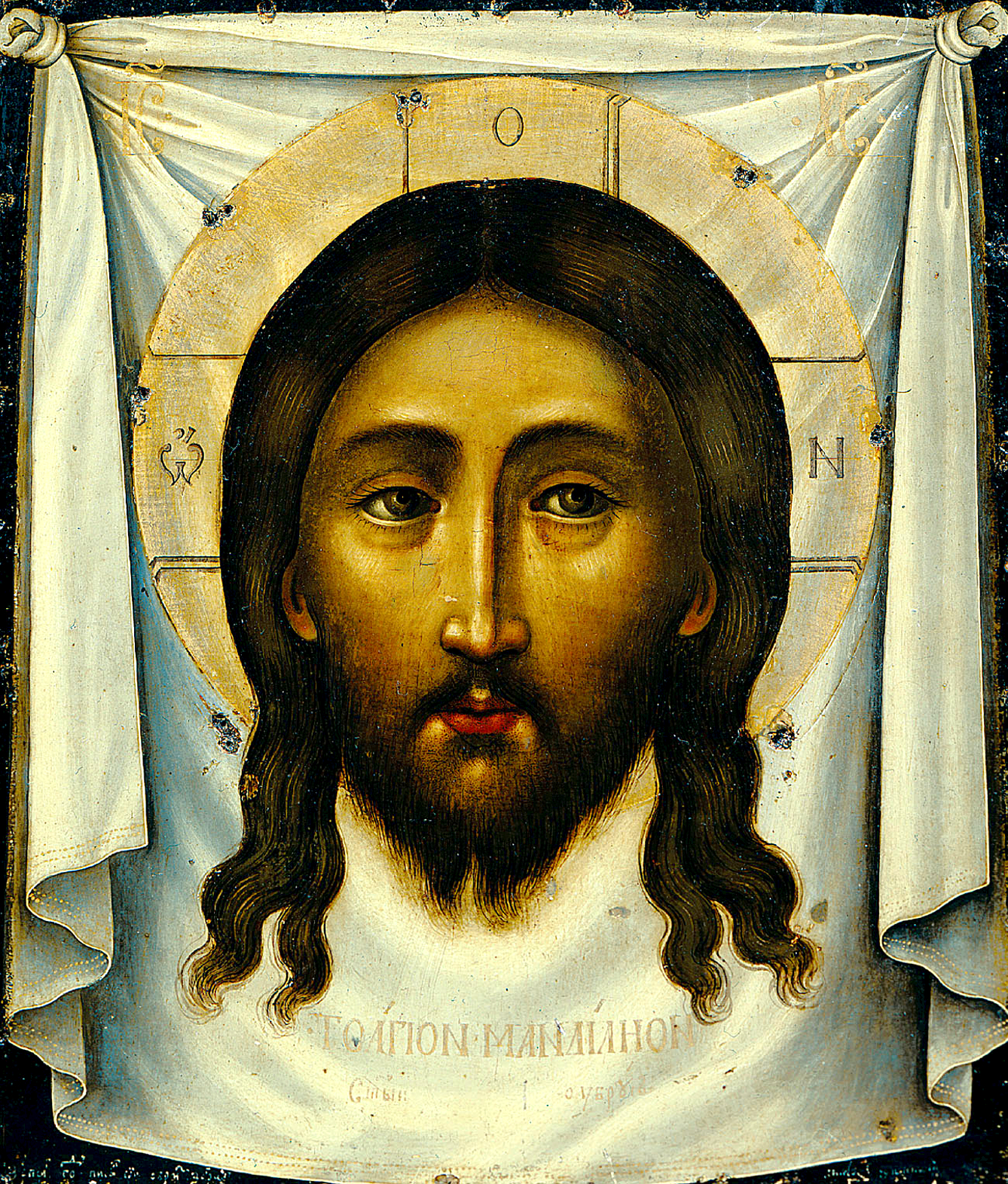
Eastern Orthodox icon of Christ "Not Made by Hand" with the Greek letters Ο ὤ Ν. Simon Ushakov, 17th century

The early Church Fathers expended much rhetorical energy on conceptions of God as a source of light; among other things this was because "in the controversies in the 4th century over the consubstantiality of the Father and the Son, the relation of the ray to the source was the most cogent example of emanation and of distinct forms with a common substance" – key concepts in the theological thought of the time.

A more Catholic interpretation is that the halo represents the light of divine grace suffusing the soul, which is perfectly united and in harmony with the physical body.

In the theology of the Eastern Orthodox Church, an icon is a "window into heaven" through which Christ and the Saints in heaven can be seen and communicated with. The gold ground of the icon indicates that what is depicted is in heaven. The halo is a symbol of the Uncreated Light (Greek: Ἄκτιστον Φῶς) or grace of God shining forth through the icon. Pseudo-Dionysius the Areopagite in his Celestial Hierarchies speaks of the angels and saints being illuminated by the grace of God, and in turn illumining others.

== Gallery – Christian art ==
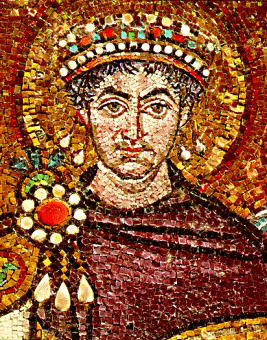
The Emperor Justinian (and the Empress Theodora) are haloed in mosaics at the Basilica of San Vitale, Ravenna, 548. See here for earlier and here for later examples.

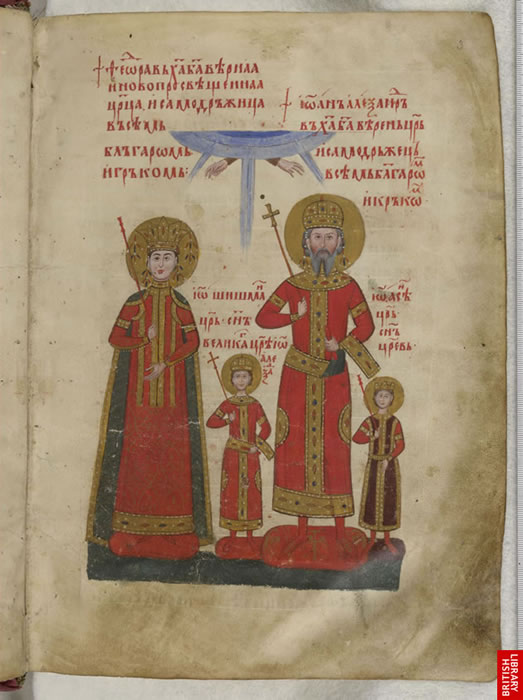
Gospels of Tsar Ivan Alexander of Bulgaria, 1355–56; the whole royal family have haloes.

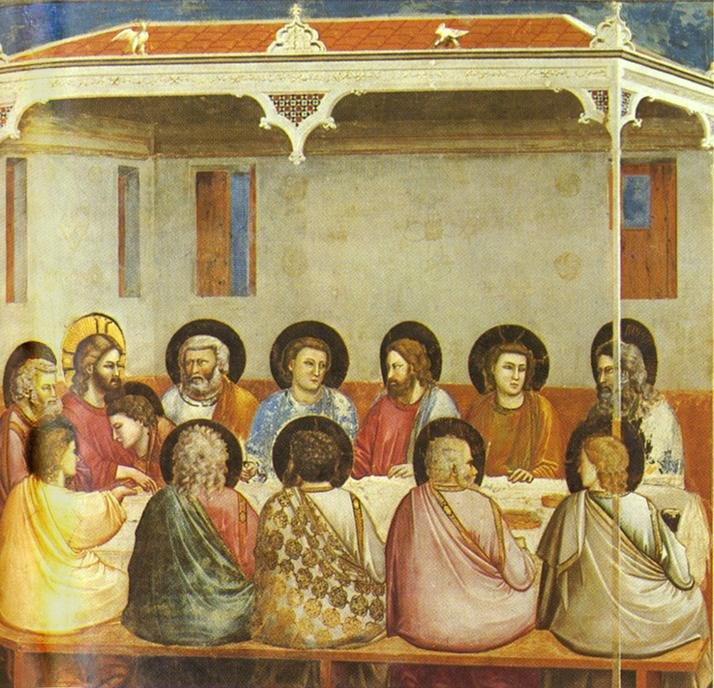
Giotto Scrovegni Chapel, 1305, with flat perspectival haloes; the view from behind causes difficulties, and John's halo has to be reduced in size.

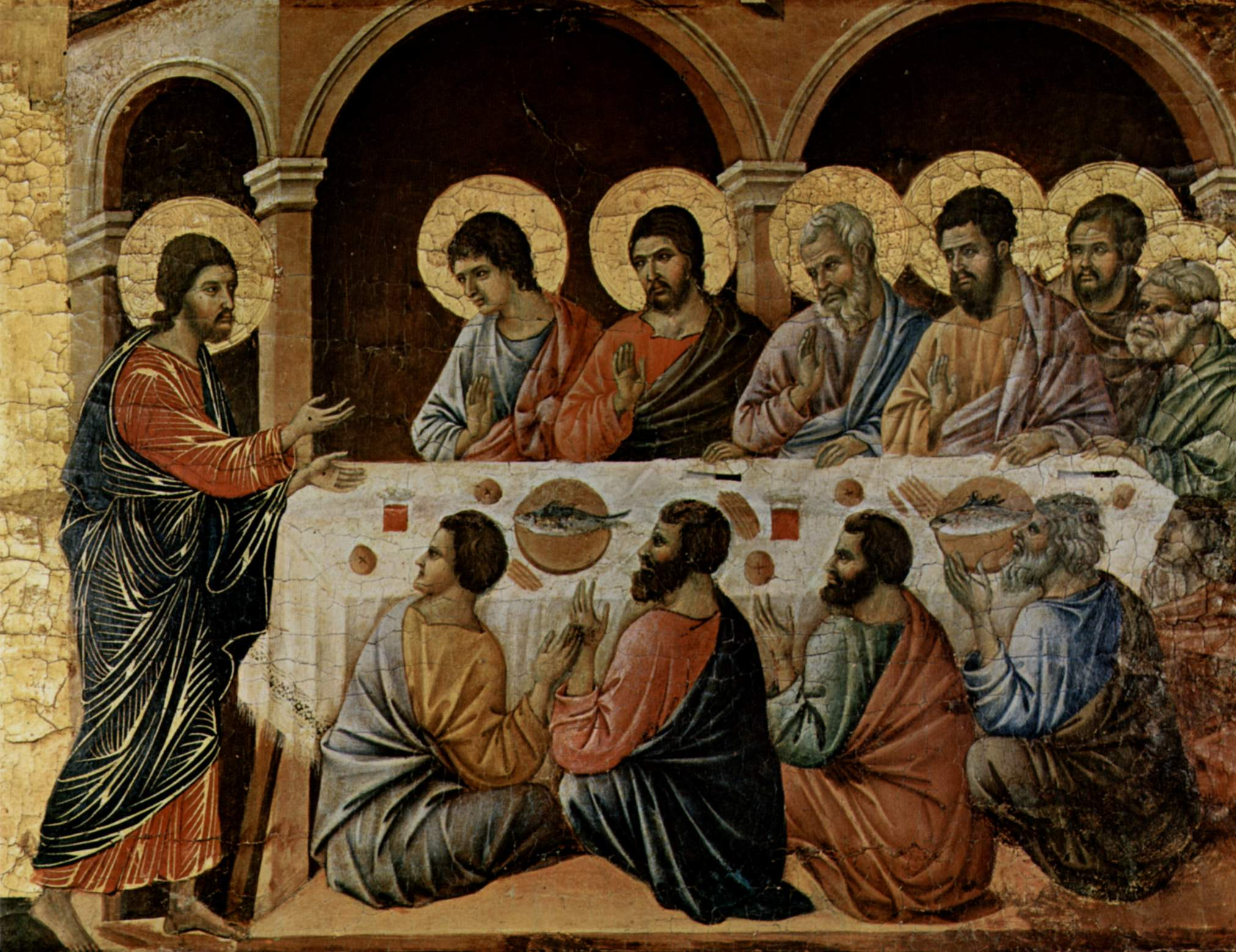
The risen Christ appearing to the Eleven (Luke 24,36-49) from Duccio's Maestà. Christ has a plain halo; the Apostles only have them where they will not seriously interfere with the composition.

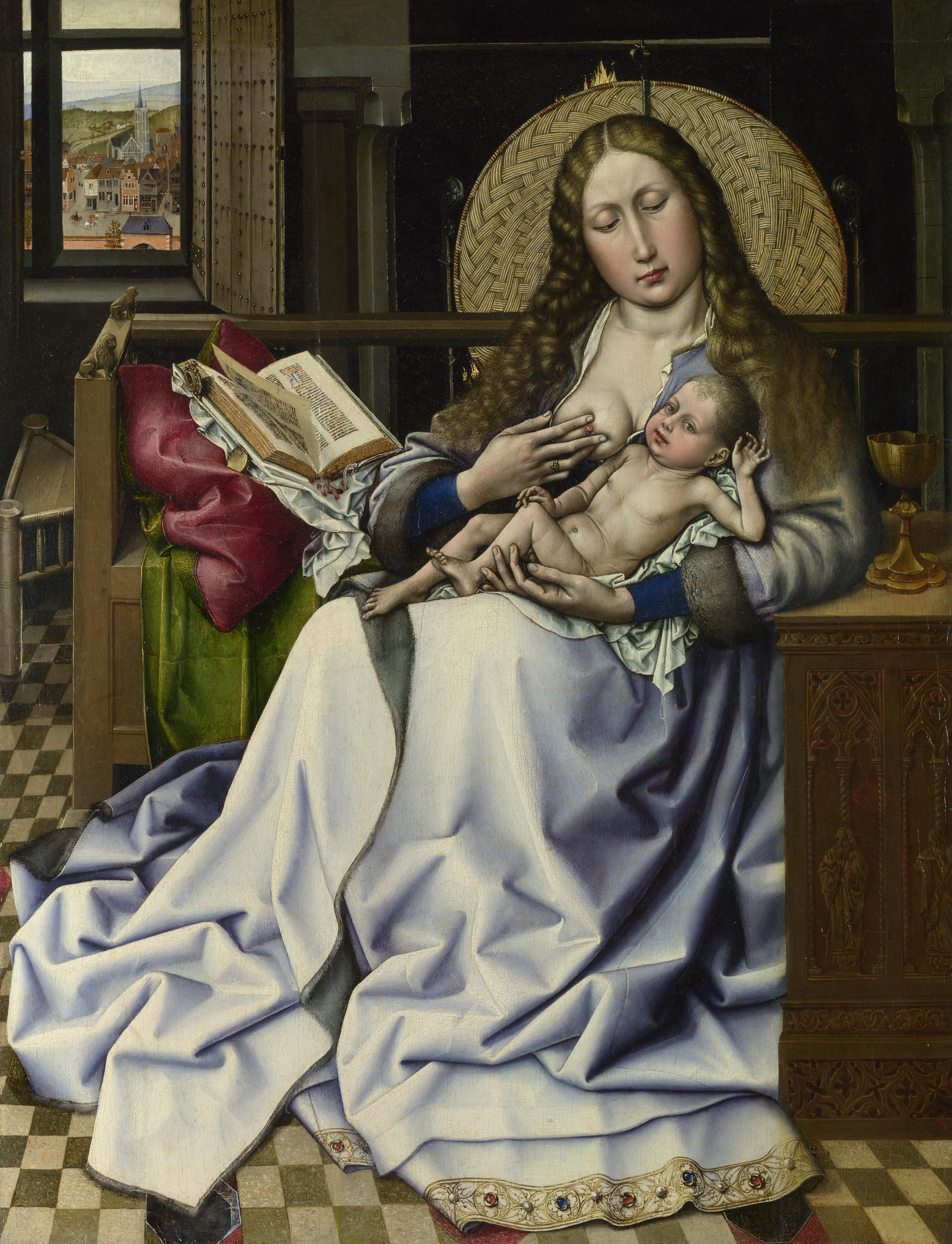
Netherlandish, before 1430. A religious scene where objects in a realistic domestic setting contain symbolism. A wicker firescreen serves as a halo.

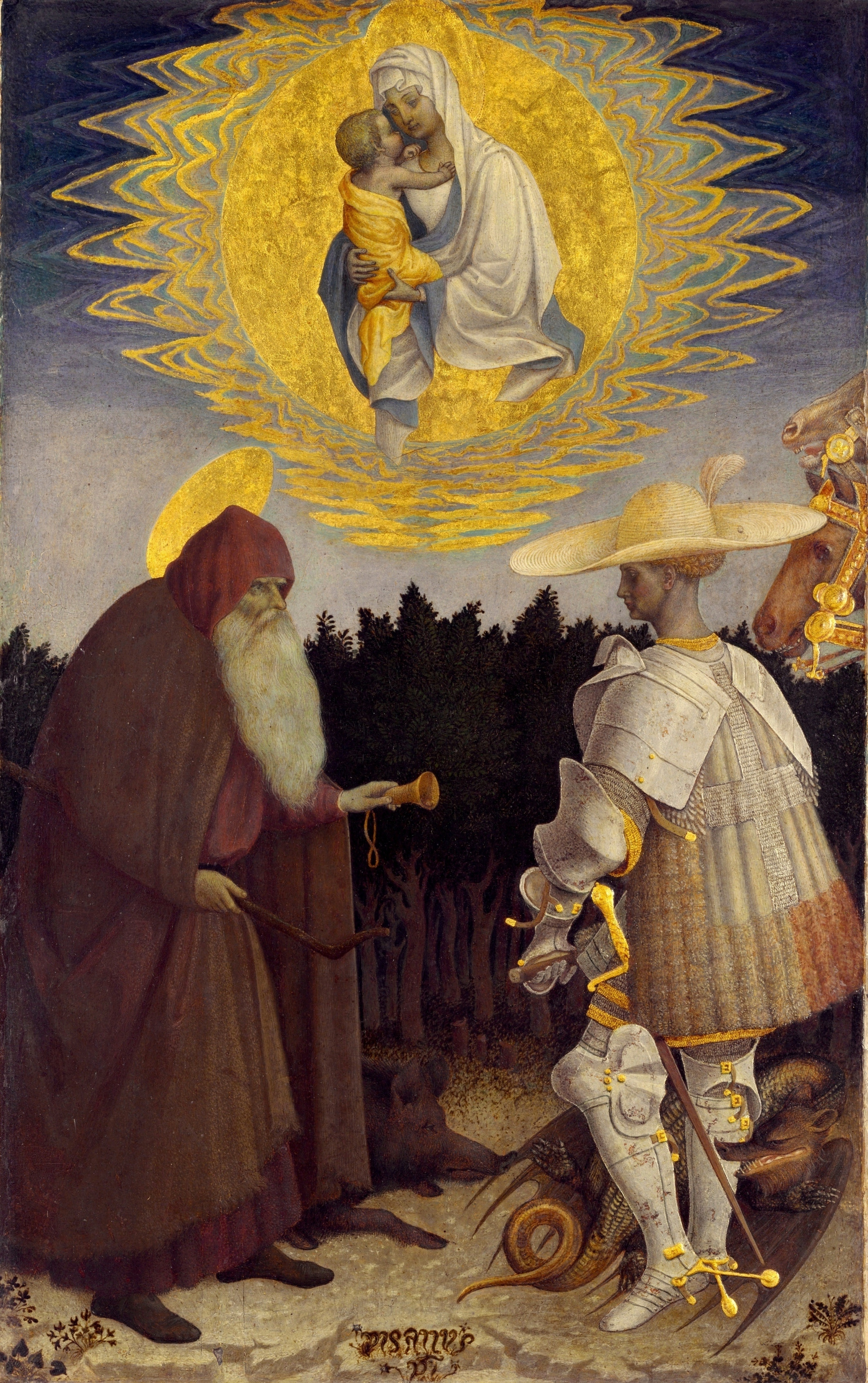
Mary above has a large aureole, St Anthony has a disk halo in perspective, but this would spoil the appearance of St George's hat. Pisanello, 1430s.

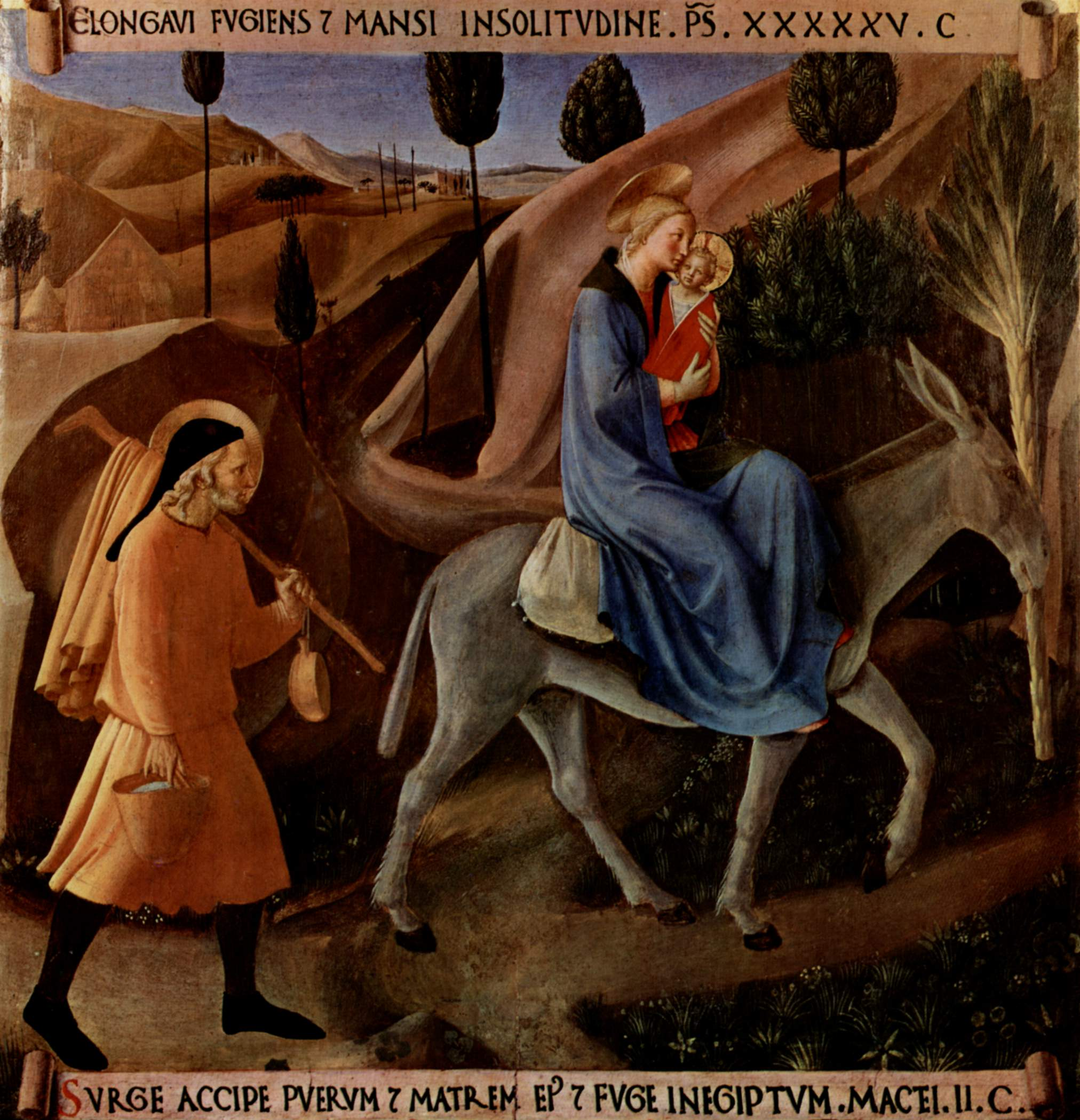
Fra Angelico 1450, Mary's halo is in perspective, Joseph's is not. Jesus still has a cruciform halo.

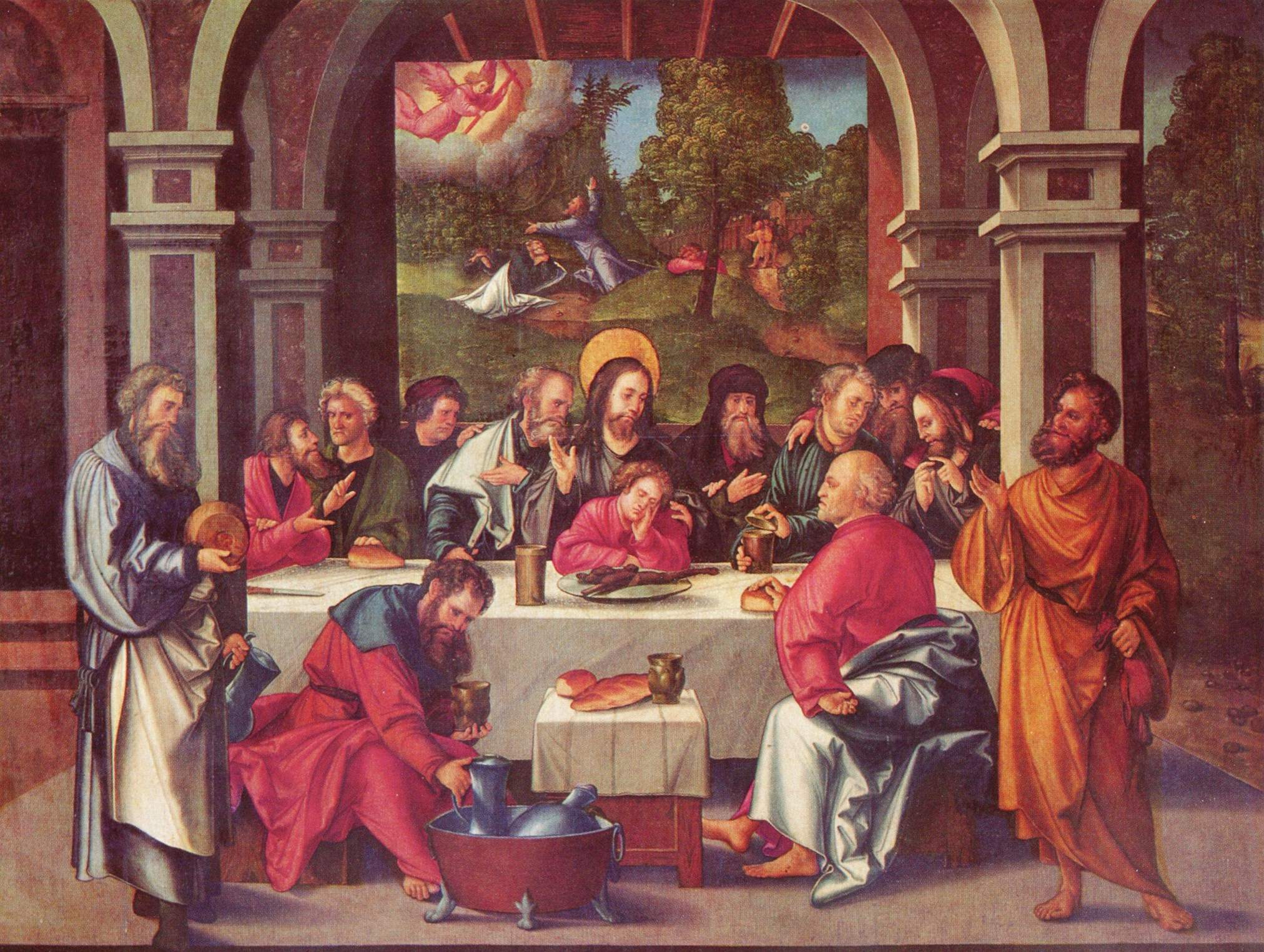
The Lutheran Hans Leonhard Schäufelein shows only Christ with a halo in this Last Supper of 1515.

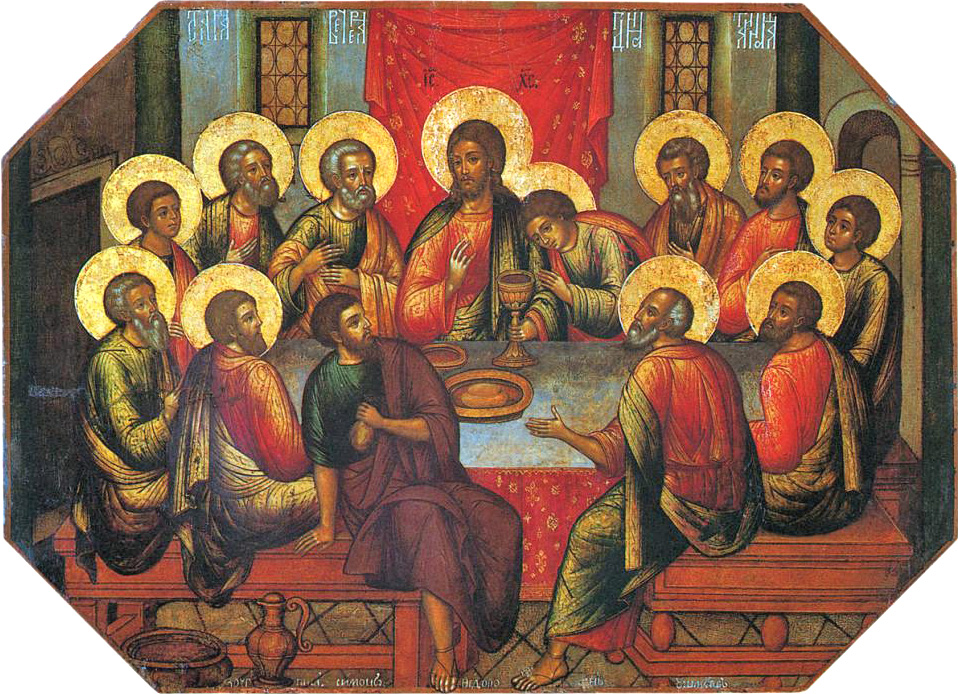
In Simon Ushakov's icon of The Last Supper (1685) eleven of the twelve apostles have haloes: only Judas Iscariot does not.

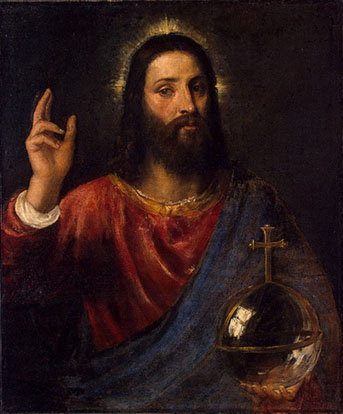
Salvator Mundi, 1570, by Titian. From the late Renaissance a more "naturalistic" form of halo was often preferred.

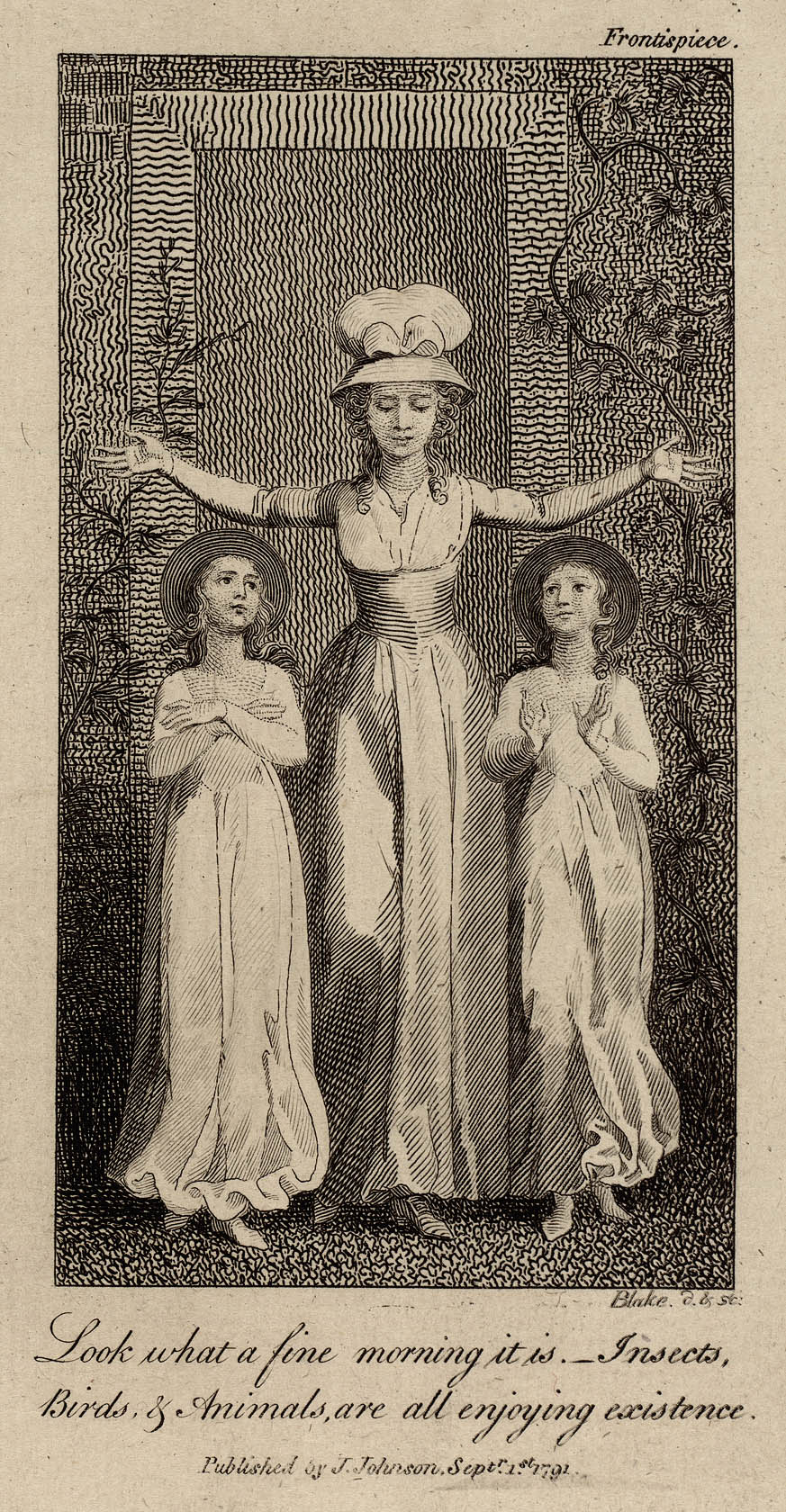
William Blake uses the hats of the two girls to suggest haloes in the frontispiece to Mary Wollstonecraft's Original Stories from Real Life, 1791.

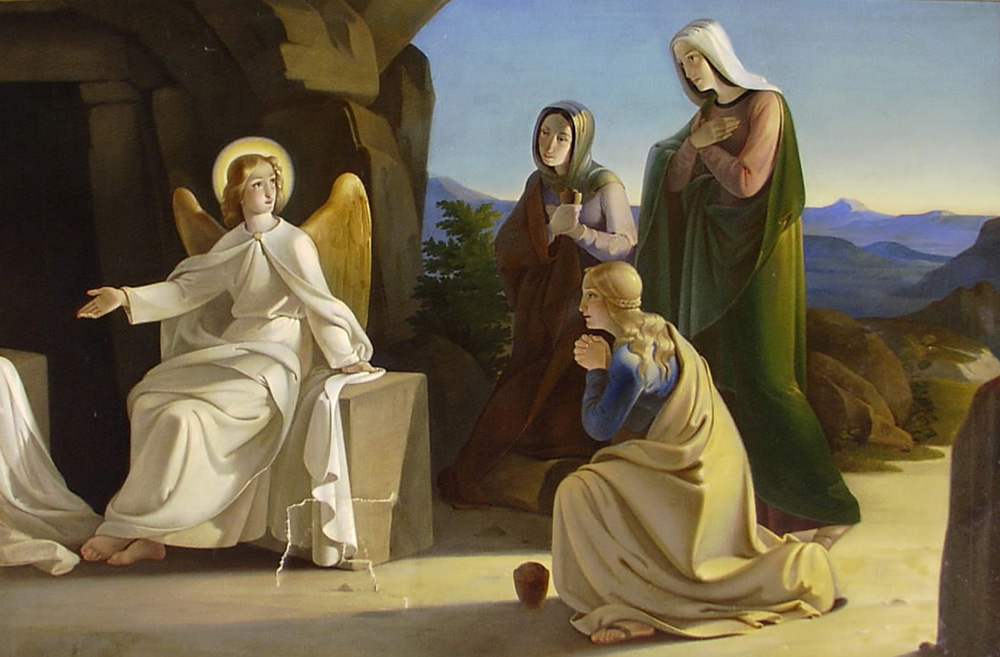
Julius Schnorr von Carolsfeld was a member of the Nazarene movement that looked back to medieval art. However, in The Three Marys at the Tomb, 1835, only the angel has a halo.

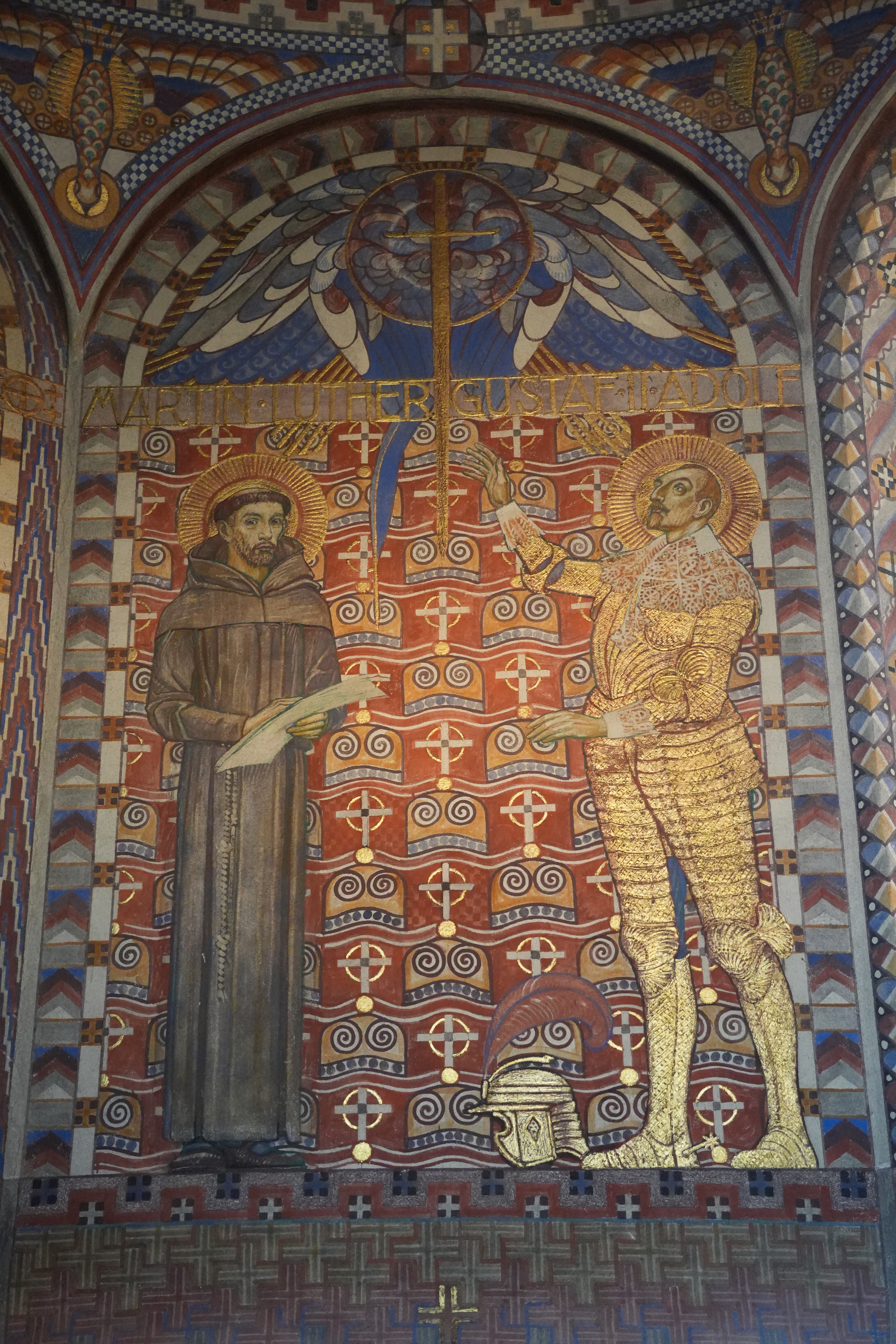
Martin Luther at left and King Gustavus Adolphus at right with halos in the Lutheran Church of the Revelation, Saltsjöbaden, Sweden. Gustavus Adolphus is regarded as a saint in Sweden.

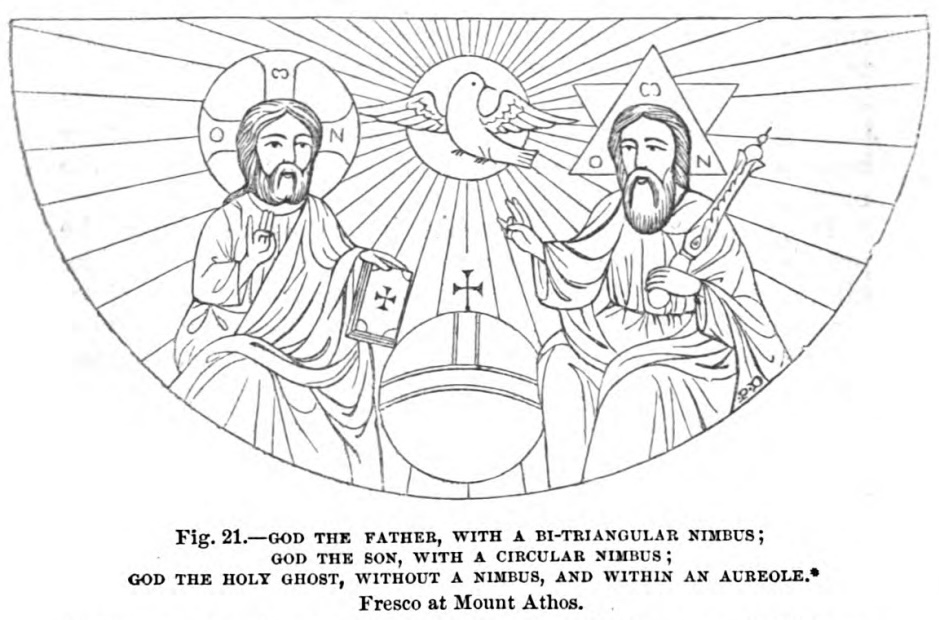
1851 copy of a Mt. Athos fresco depicting the Trinity with different types of haloes: God the Father has a doubled triangular halo, God the Son has a cruciform halo, and the Holy Spirit is within a full-body aureole.

== See also ==
- Aura (paranormal)
- Aureola
- Crown of Immortality
- Glory (optical phenomenon)
- Glory of God in art
- Lesya
- Velificatio
