= Olle Hjortzberg =

Swedish painter and illustrator (1872–1959)

Gustaf Olof (Olle) Hjortzberg
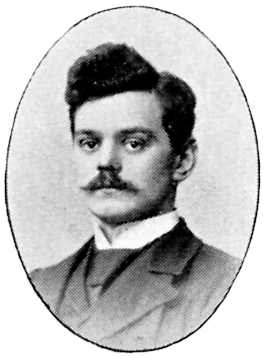
- Olle Hjortzberg
- Born: 14 November 1872; Stockholm, Sweden
- Died: 8 March 1959 (aged 86); Stockholm, Sweden
- Occupations: Swedish painter and illustrator

Gustaf Olof (Olle) Hjortzberg (14 November 1872 – 8 March 1959) was a Swedish painter and illustrator. He is remembered above all for contributing to the revival of wall paintings in Swedish churches.

== Biography ==
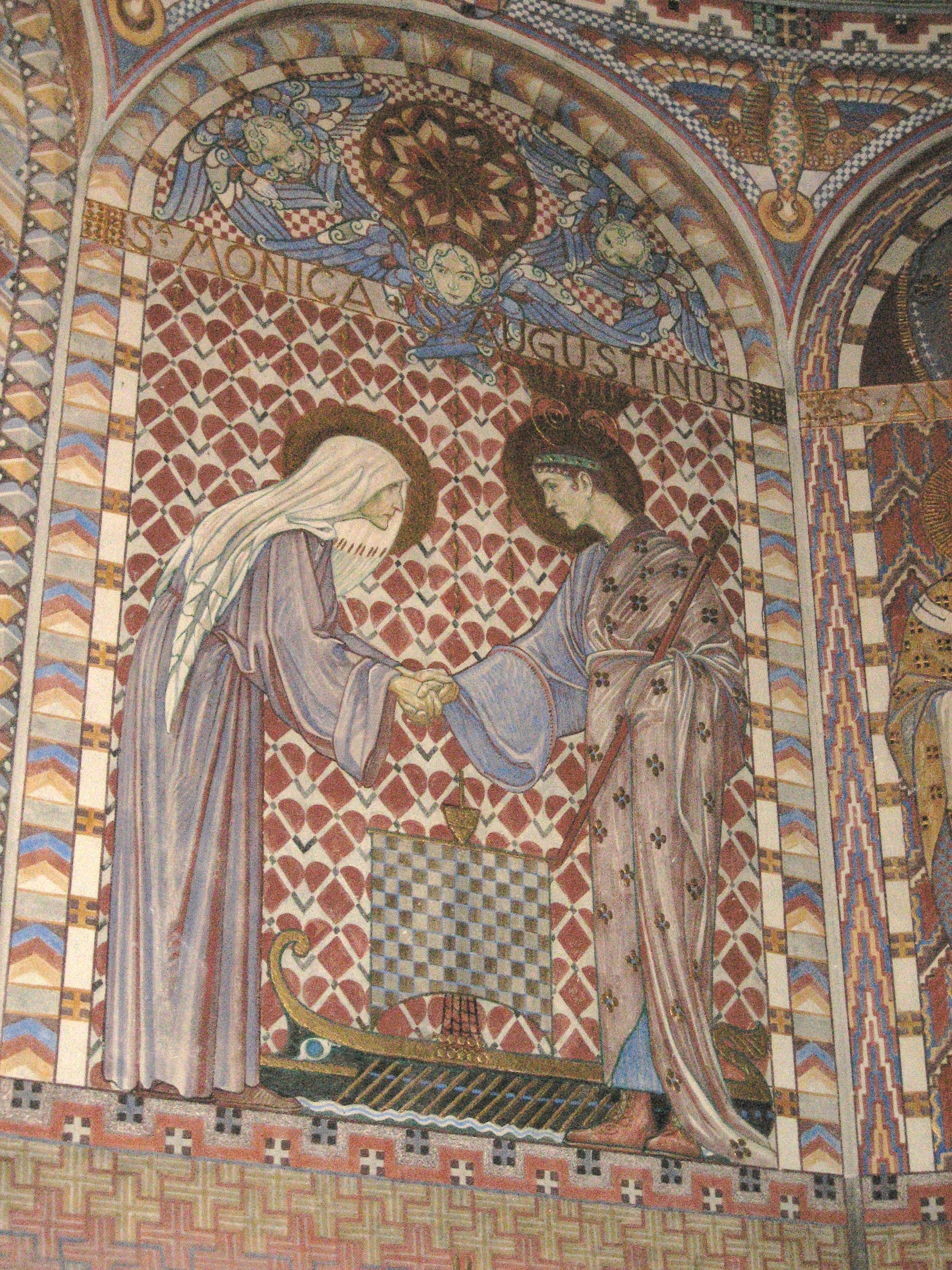
Olle Hjortzberg: Painting of St Monica and St Augustine in Uppenbarelsekyrkan, Saltsjöbaden

Born in Stockholm, Hjortzberg was brought up in Linköping where his father taught him to paint watercolours. In 1886, he moved to Stockholm where he became acquainted with the architect and illustrator Agi Lindegren who introduced him to ornamental work. From 1892, he studied at the Royal Swedish Academy of Arts. After marrying in 1898, he travelled with his wife to Paris and, in 1899, to Italy where he visited Florence and Perugia. He then went to Syria and Palestine where the oriental environment influenced his art. In 1902, he visited London before returning to Italy where he stayed for a time in Rome studying the old masters before travelling to Ravenna to see the Byzantine art.

In 1905, he returned to Sweden where he devoted himself to Christian art, first designing stained glass windows for Stockholm's Katarina Church and then decorating the ceiling of Klara Church with scenes from the life of Christ. In 1913, he decorated Uppenbarelsekyrkan in Saltsjöbaden with strongly coloured Christian figures in a style inspired by Byzantine and Assyrian art. He painted other murals in Swedish churches and decorated several altarpieces.

Hjortzberg was also active as an illustrator, contributing to the Gustav V Bible (published 1925), creating a poster for the Stockholm Olympic Games (1912) and designing commemorative stamps. He taught at the academy from 1911 to 1937 and was director until 1941.

== Awards ==
In 1945, Hjortzberg was awarded the Prince Eugen Medal.

== Literature ==
- Schiller, Harald Torsten Viking; Hjortzberg, Olle (1954). Olle Hjortzberg. En Konstnärsbiografi. [With Reproductions and Portraits.].
