= Uppenbarelsekyrkan =

Church building in Nacka Municipality, Sweden

Coordinates: 59°16′45″N 18°17′35″E

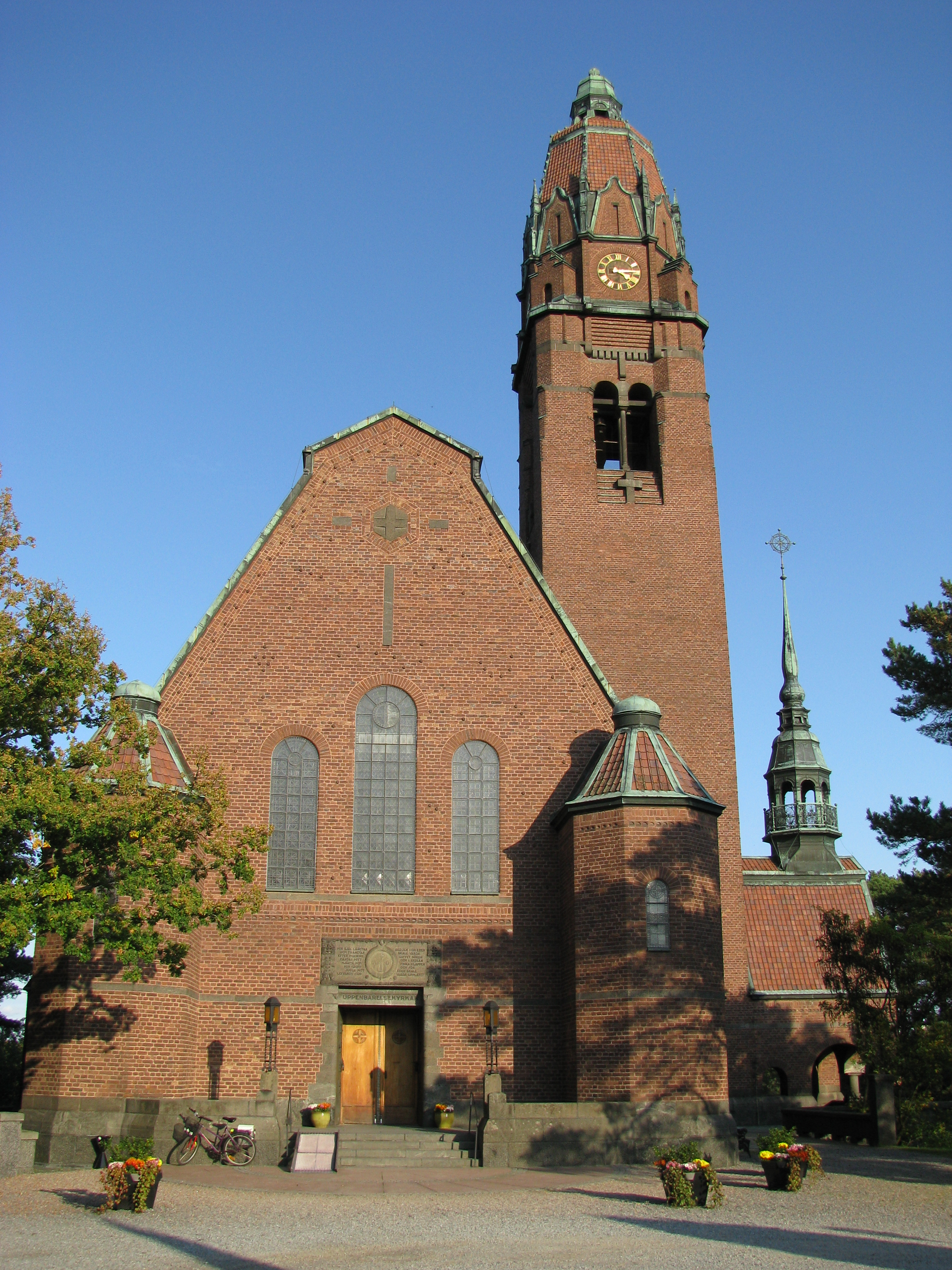
Uppenbarelsekyrkan.

Uppenbarelsekyrkan (Church of the Revelation) is a church in Saltsjöbaden in Nacka Municipality, southeast of Stockholm, Sweden.

The church was built in 1910–1913 to designs by Swedish architect Ferdinand Boberg. It was financed by Swedish businessman Knut Wallenberg and inaugurated on his 60th birthday, on May 18, 1913. Among the people involved in the decoration of the church are Nathan Söderblom, Johnny Roosval, Carl Milles, Olle Hjortzberg, Filip Månsson, Oscar Brandtberg and Hugo Alfvén.
