= Central Post Office Building, Malmö =

Building in Malmö, Sweden

- Centralposthuset
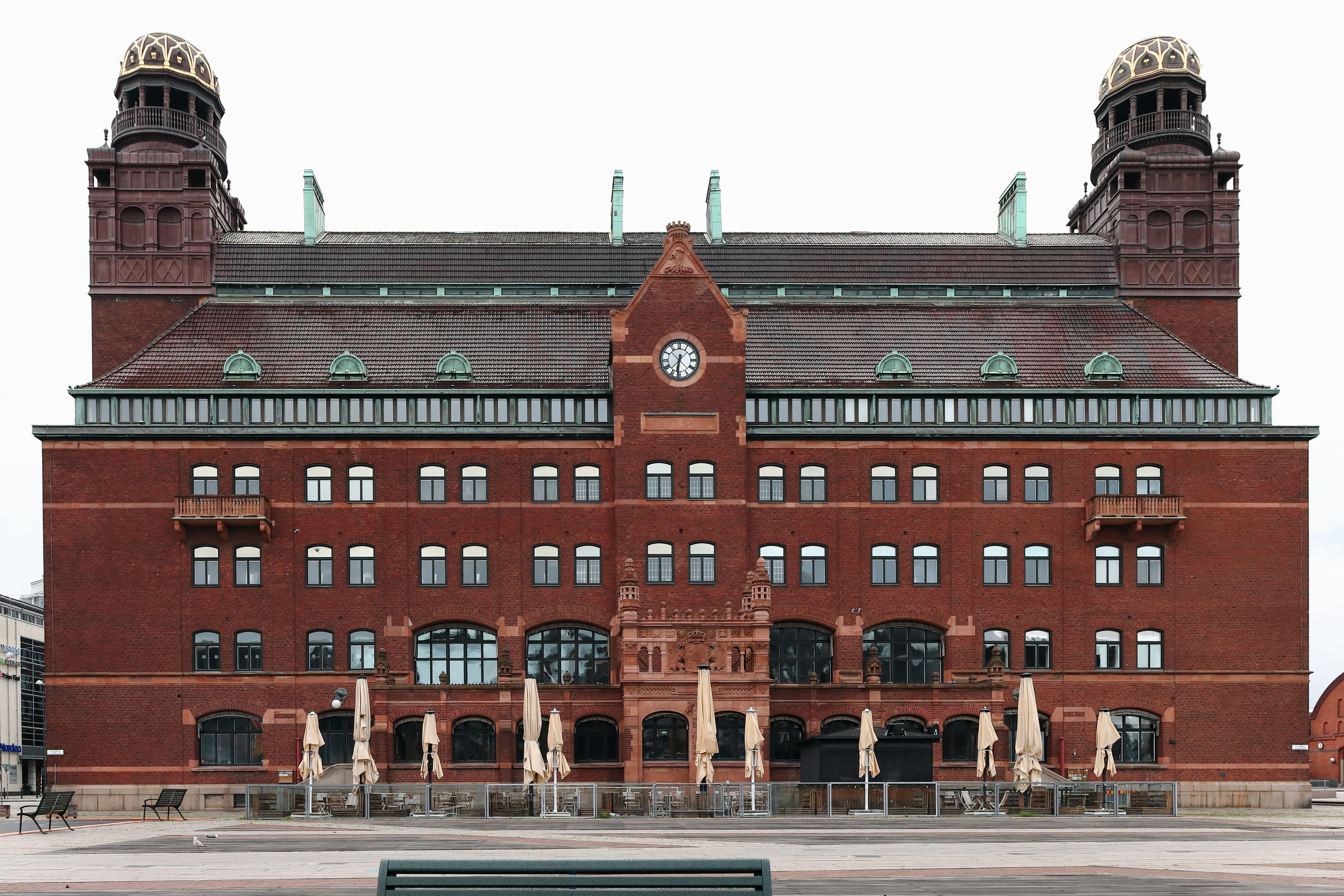
- West facade, front view (2023)
- Interactive map of the Central Post Office Building, Malmö area

General information
- Architectural style: National Romantic style
- Location: Posthusplatsen 4
- Coordinates: 55°36′36″N 12°59′56″E
- Construction started: 1900
- Completed: 1906

Design and construction
- Architect: Ferdinand Boberg

The Central Post Office Building, Malmö, Sweden, (Swedish: Centralposthuset) is a historic building in the National Romantic style. It was designed by Ferdinand Boberg, one of Sweden’s most prominent architects of his time. The building was inaugurated in 1906 and was placed at Malmö's city center, next to both Malmö Central Station and the steamship docks, in the Inre hamnen (inner harbour) neighbourhood. Today the Central Post Office building serves as an office. Mail processing moved in 2006.

== History ==
The Central Post Office Building was constructed between 1900 and 1906. It is a building in the National Romantic style, mostly popular in Nordic countries in the years around 1900. The building's appearance is also inspired by Brick Gothic architecture from the Middle Ages, common especially in the cities around the Baltic Sea. Another parallel is the Copenhagen City Hall, completed just one year earlier, in 1905, also with dark austere brick walls. The unusually large cupolas of the two towers, a characteristic detail of Boberg's architecture, caused some debate at the time.

Boberg, who had earlier designed Stockholm’s Central Post Office and Rosenbad, was pleased with how this building turned out and commented in a letter from 1907 that it was perhaps his best work. The top floor was given an added row of windows in 1944 designed by Erik Lallerstedt.

== Rebuild ==
The Central Post Office Building became a listed building in 1935 and was restored and modernized between 2006 and 2020. The originally open courtyard on the east side was replaced by a three-story glass extension in 2010–2011. The copper roof and the towers are of unusually high quality and were renovated 2016-2019.

== Gallery ==
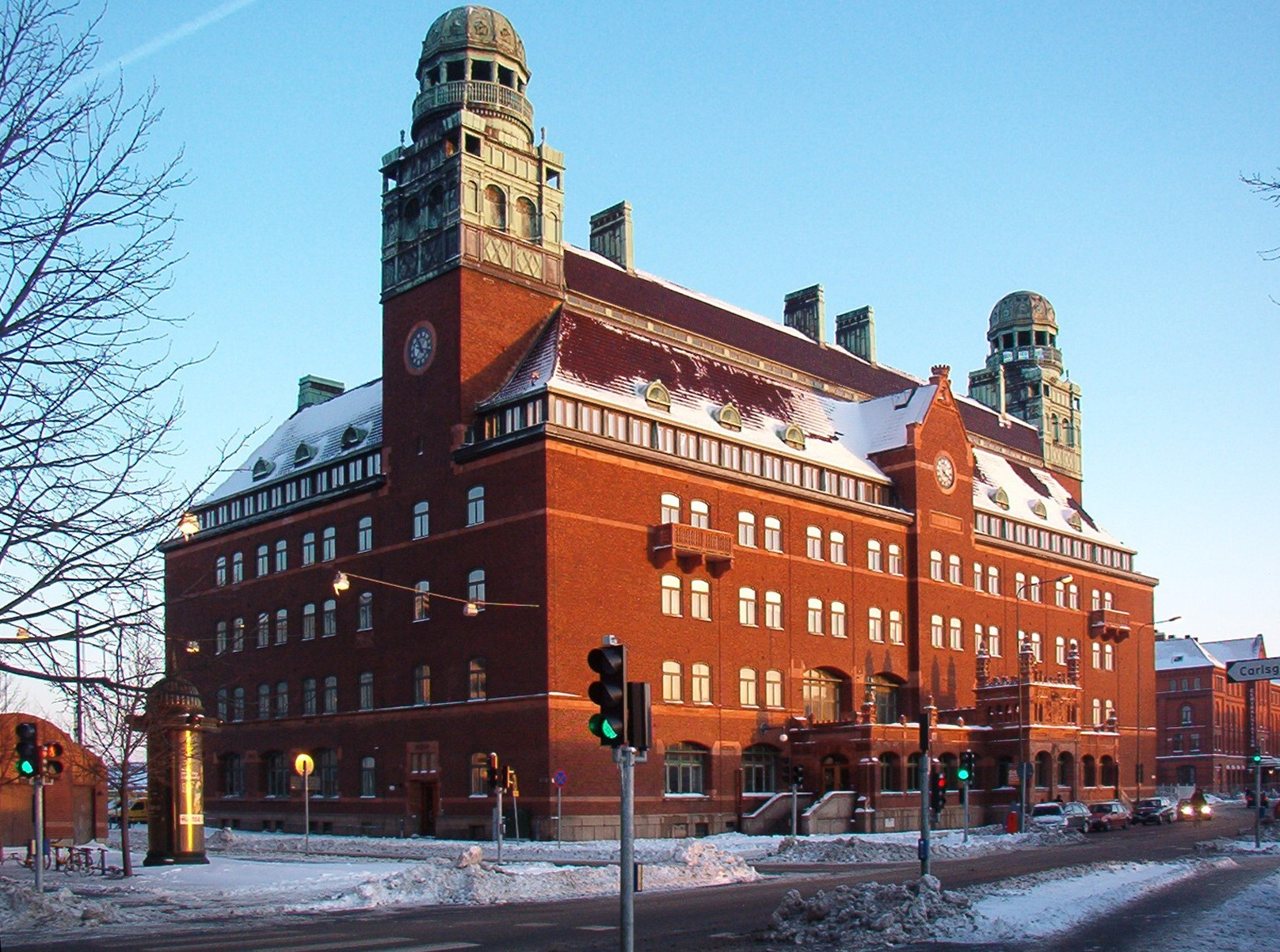
2006, before renovation of the cupolas had begun

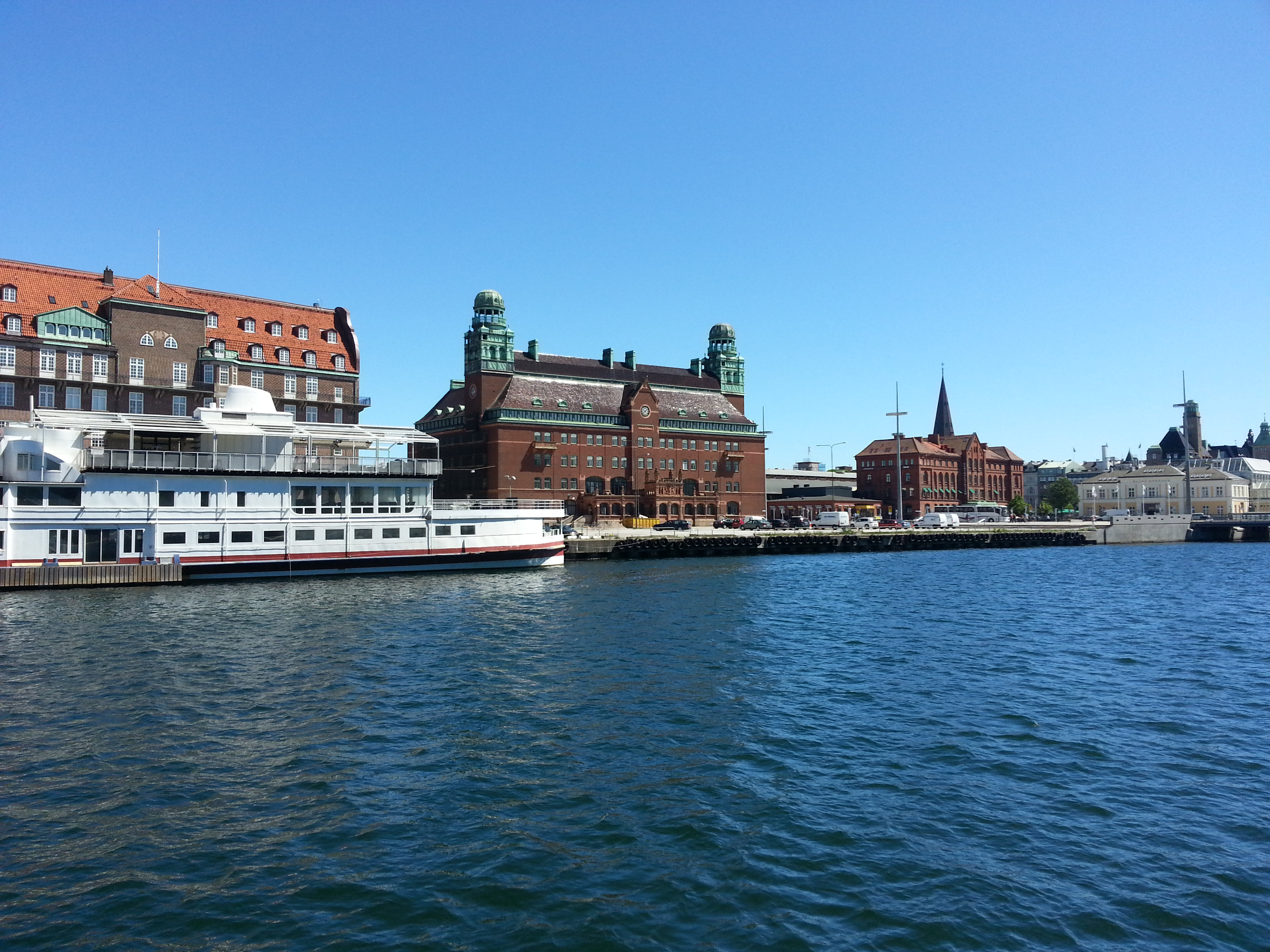
The Central Post Office Building lies at the Inner Harbour, Inre hamnen, and next to the Malmö Central Station

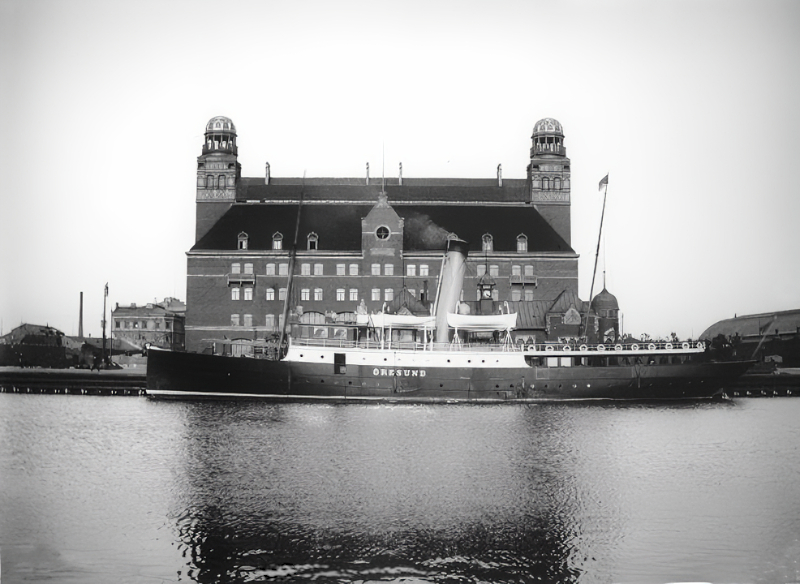
1908, two years after completion, the clock has not yet been installed

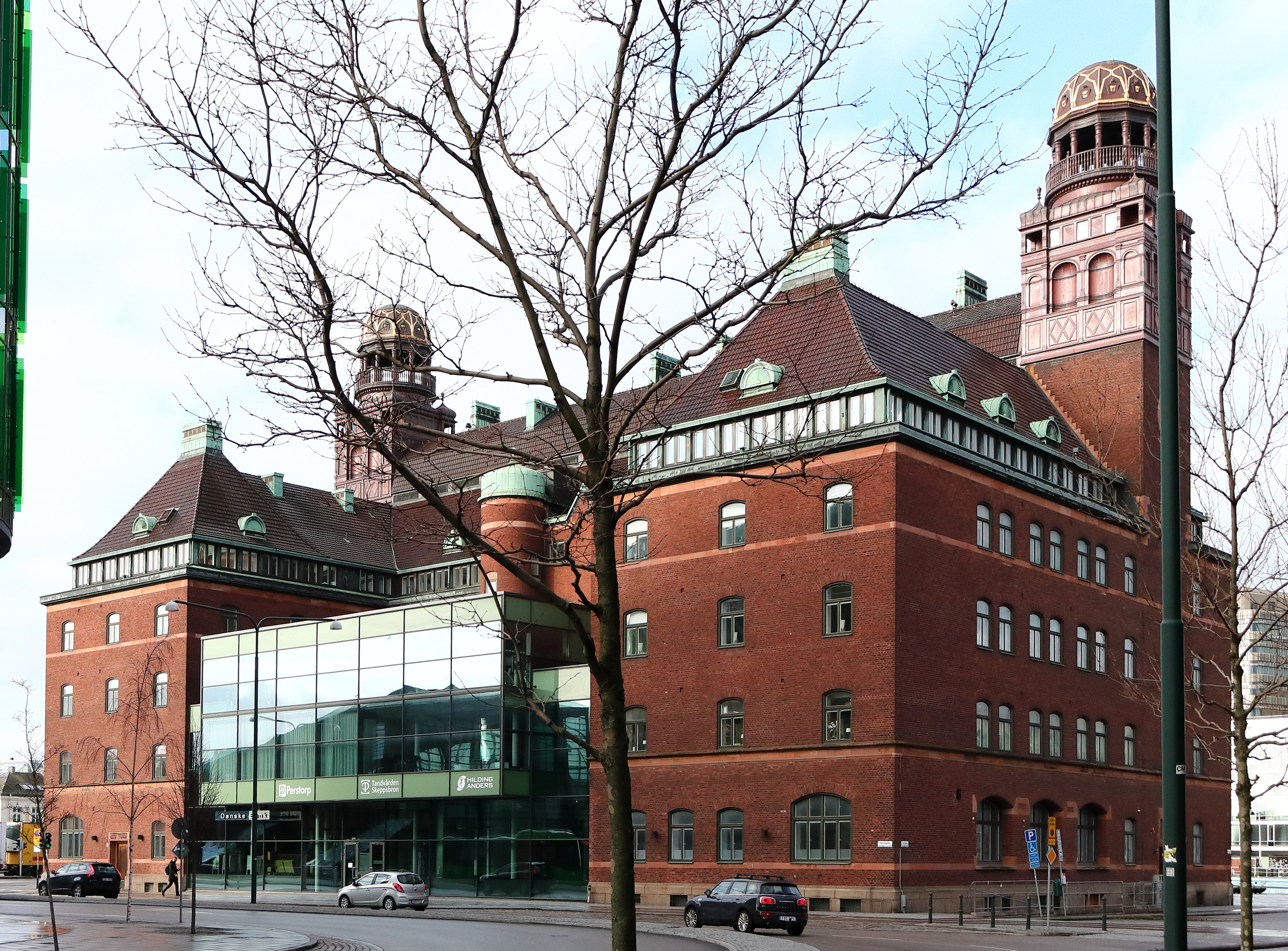
2021, rear view, the renovated cupolas and the new three floor glass extension visible
