= Murder of Katarina Jakobsson =

Murder and incident of cannibalism

Coordinates: 55°36′3.2″N 13°0′42.2″E

Katarina Jakobsson
- Divers searching Inre hamnen in Malmö for the remains of Jakobsson, 1980.
- Born: Ebba Katarina Jakobsson; 29 October 1950; Lund, Sweden
- Died: 7 November 1979 (aged 29); Malmö, Sweden
- Cause of death: Murder by drowning
- Partner(s): Patrik Nilsson (1970–1978); Bengt Hjalmarsson (1979; her murderer)
- Children: 1

Ebba Katarina Jakobsson (29 October 1950 – 7 November 1979) was a Swedish woman who was murdered and dismembered by her boyfriend Bengt Erik Hjalmarsson (later named Erik Ludvig Gyllenfjäder; 18 March 1949 – 12 January 2015) (Note: The names of both Jakobsson and Gyllenfjäder have been kept secret in mass media; instead, pseudonyms have been used; Jakobsson has been referred to as "Carina Johansson" or "Eva", whilst Gyllenfjäder has been referred to as "Lars".) in his apartment on Kornettsgatan 20B in central Malmö, Sweden, on 7 November 1979. Both Jakobsson and Hjalmarsson suffered from various mental disorders during their respective upbringings, which included schizophrenia, with both having sporadic contact with psychiatric care facilities. Jakobsson and Hjalmarsson had met each other during the summer of 1979, with her moving into his apartment in November.

Jakobsson was murdered by being drowned in Hjalmarsson's bathtub after an attempt to seduce Hjalmarsson into sexual intercourse. Following this, Hjalmarsson dismembered Jakobsson's corpse, weighed them and discarded of her skeletal remains in the harbor of Inre hamnen. Hjalmarsson then consumed roughly 20 kilograms of Jakobsson's flesh by cooking it and serving it with red wine during the course of several meals. As a result, Hjalmarsson has been known as Malmökannibalen (The Malmö Cannibal), with the case being referred to as Kannibalmordet på Kornettsgatan (The Cannibal Murder on Kornettsgatan)

Investigations into Jakobsson's murder began when her father reported her missing on 10 November 1979. In January 1980, Hjalmarsson was arrested for an unrelated burglary at his mother's house in Helsingborg, and was a week later arrested at Jakobsson's apartment. During interrogation, Hjalmarsson initially denied claims, but gave a detailed confession after bits of meat found in his refrigerator were found to be of human origin. Jakobsson's skeletal remains were found in late January 1980. Hjalmarsson was sentenced to indefinitive psychiatric care in June 1980, and changed his name to Erik Ludvig Gyllenfjäder in 1986. He died in 2015.

== Early life and background ==
Ebba Katarina Jakobsson was born on 29 October 1950 in the town of Lund in Scania, Sweden. In 1969, Jakobsson started experiencing symptoms of schizophrenia. As a direct consequence, she was admitted to the Malmö Östra psychiatric hospital in Segevång, where she received pills and injections of antipsychotics to combat her illness. For most of the 1970s, Jakobsson remained intermittedly admitted to the psychiatric hospital. From an early age, she expressed interest in Indian mythology, and as such engaged on two failed pilgrimages to India. On the first trip following graduation from her gymnasium in 1970, she was accompanied by her then boyfriend Patrik Nilsson. However, due to a gastroenteritis inflammation, the pair were forced to abandon their plans after reaching Pakistan. According to Nilsson, it was during the aftermath of this pilgrimage that Jakobsson first was admitted to the psychiatric hospital. Jakobsson was similarly also forced to cancel a later solo pilgrimage in Pakistan during a later part of the 1970s, choosing to not leave Sweden again.

By the mid-1970s, Jakobsson and Nilsson were avid cannabis smokers, hanging out on Gustav Adolfs torg on a regular basis. In 1974, Nilsson was sentenced to two years imprisonment by the Malmö District Court for drug possession; shortly after his release in 1976, Jakobsson gave birth to their child, a son who they named after a Hindu God. However, Jakobsson descended further into her mental illnesses, having outbursts and started getting hygienic issues; as such, Nilsson filed divorce and was granted custody of their son. The two remained friends despite this. By the summer of 1979, Jakobsson was granted parole from the Malmö Östra hospital and moved into a two-room apartment on Almbacksgatan 14B in Möllevången, an apartment which was regularly visited by a home care assistant. By this point, Jakobsson was on disability pension and didn't hold a job.

Jakobsson first met Bengt Hjalmarsson by chance on 26 July 1979 in the cafeteria of a Tempo in central Malmö. After being asked to guard her belongings whilst going to the toilet, Hjalmarsson became intrigued with her Indian literature and struck up conversation with her once she returned. Over the following ten days, Hjalmarsson would visit Jakobsson's apartment almost every day, often bringing a camera along with him as he had a desire to photograph Jakobsson. In early November 1979, Jakobsson moved into Hjalmarsson's apartment on Kornettsgatan 20B in central Malmö. She was last seen alive at roughly 19:00 on the evening of 7 November on Evagatan in Eriksfält after visiting her parents, who noted that she was "unusually meager and depressed". Jakobsson had told her parents she was awaiting unspecified guests at her apartment, and needed to prepare for their arrival.

== Murder and cannibalism ==
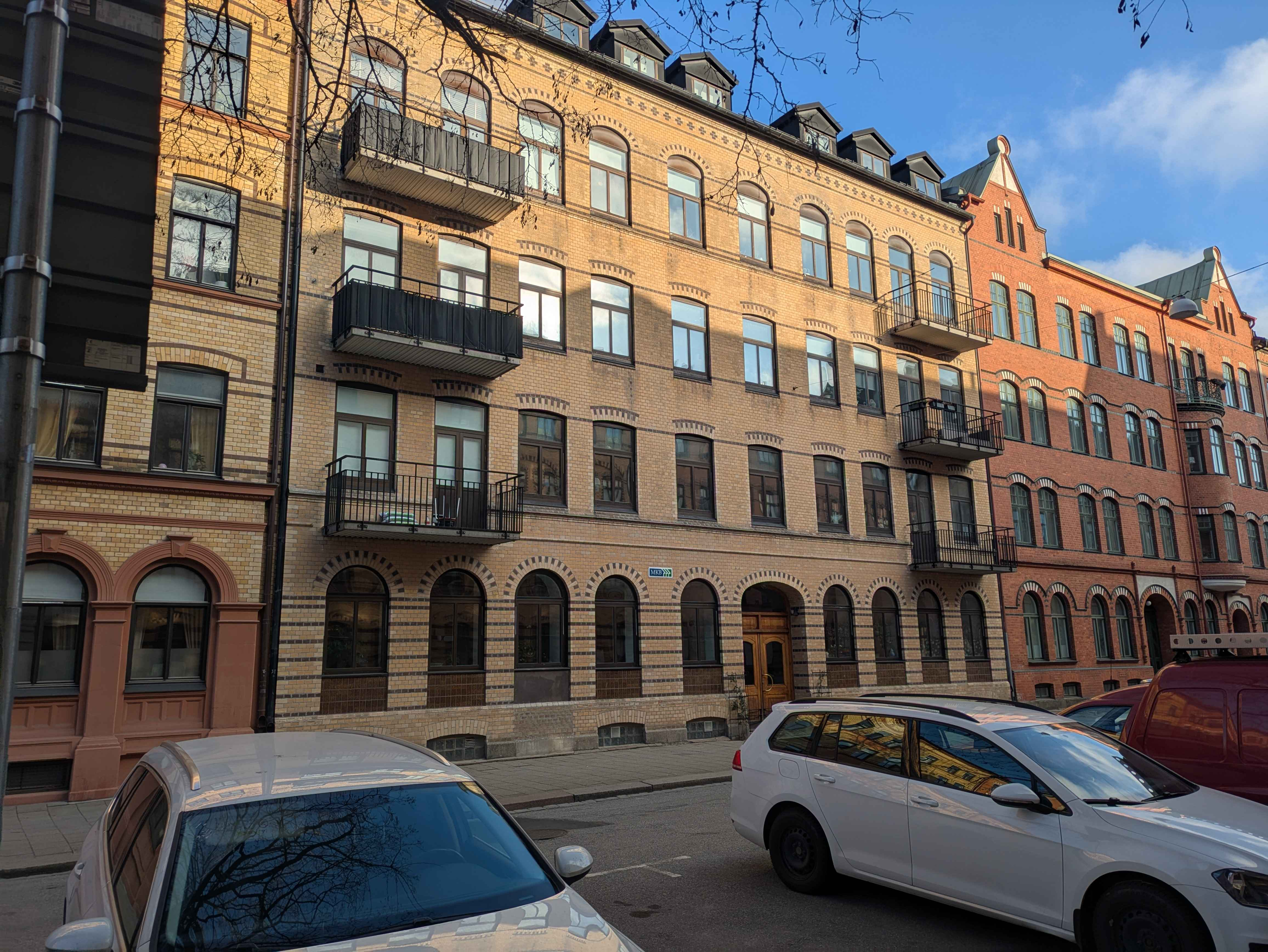
The murder occurred in Hjalmarsson's apartment on Kornettsgatan 20B in central Malmö.

Katarina Jakobsson returned home to her and Bengt Hjalmarsson's shared apartment on Kornettsgatan 20B during the evening of 7 November 1979. According to Hjalmarsson, the two shared a dinner before he retreated into the apartment's bedroom to read. According to his later testimony, Jakobsson proposed sexual intercourse and cuddling to Hjalmarsson, something which prompted him to retrieve a pair of recently purchased handcuffs, restraining Jakobsson with them. He subsequently entered the bathroom, filling his bathtub with water. When Jakobsson followed Hjalmarsson into the bathroom, he allegedly pointed at the bathtub and exclaimed "shut up, or I'll drown you". Following this, Hjalmarsson "grabbed hold of her chest, throwing an arm around her shoulder" before forcing her head into the bathtub. He continued pushing her chest downwards until her body eventually "stopped moving" and he was certain she was dead. After this, Hjalmarsson started emptying the bathtub and returned to his room in the meantime.

A short period afterwards, Hjalmarsson started meticulously dismembering Jakobsson's corpse in his bare underwear "as he did not want to get bloody". Hjalmarsson would place each body part in separate plastic bags that he went on to store in his combined freezer-fridge. He flayed the skin on her skull after decapitating it because he "was curious how it looked like", comparing it to images and drawings in anatomical books he possessed. Jakobsson's hair was kept in plastic bags in his wardrobe. Hjalmarsson disposed of the epidermis and intestines by "cutting it up into small pieces" and flushing it down the toilet. He weighed each body part on a scale and wrote them in notes and notebooks. In order to hinder forensic identification of her body, he used a pair of pliers to pull most of her teeth out of the skull. Jakobsson's skeletal remains, legs and teeth were disposed over several days during evenings; the route Hjalmarsson took on foot led him past central parts of Malmö, past the Malmö Central Station and into the Inre hamnen district. He poured the contents of the plastic bags over the wharf edges in hopes that the organisms living in the water alongside the heavy Maritime traffic in the area would destroy the evidence.

What brought attention to the already "macabre" case was the cannibalism involved during the disposal of Jakobsson's body. According to sources, Hjalmarsson kept 44 kilograms (97 pounds) of Jakobsson's flesh, including her liver and heart, which he partially consumed over the course of several meals between 10 and 17 November 1979. During police questioning, Hjalmarsson admitted that he consumed her flesh by initially frying it, but opted to boil it as "frying it made the meat chewy and rubbery", as opposed to boiling it which "softened it". He served the flesh with portions of rice, macaroni and potato alongside glasses of red wine. Eventually, Hjalmarsson "got tired" of consuming Jakobsson, and left between 17 and 20 kilograms (37,5 and 44 pounds) of her meat in the freezer-fridge to rot. In the opinion of journalist Joakim Palmkvist, cannibalism was the solution to two of Hjalmarsson's issues; he could dispose of Jakobsson's body discreetly at the same time he saved money by not having to purchase items in the grocery store.

== Investigation and trial ==
=== Early arrests ===
By coincidence, Bengt Hjalmarsson was arrested by the Malmö Police Authority for a separate crime on the afternoon of 8 January 1980, two months after the murder. Hjalmarsson's mother had reported her son to the Helsingborg police regarding a burglary that occurred in her house on Bogesundgatan in Ramlösa on Christmas Eve 1979. Hjalmarsson had stolen valuable books, an older mortar and pestle and flint axes. Due to Hjalmarsson's uncooperative nature during the arrest, the police obtained a search warrant to his apartment on Kornettsgatan on 9 January. During their initial search of the apartment, police found it "cluttered" with boxes stacked on top of each other. Amongst things found in the apartment were a katana, a cardboard box with women's clothes, wigs and a leather whip, which "suggested an unnatural sexual deviation". The police men present in the apartment noted a foul smell from the refrigerator, which was revealed to be six slabs of meat wrapped neatly in white fabric. However, it was initially assumed to be spoiled venison or oxe meat, upon which the police diverted their attention elsewhere. In addition to Hjalmarsson's mother's belongings, the police also found roughly 400 books belonging to the Malmö City Library worth over 100,000 Swedish kronor.

Hjalmarsson spent two nights in the police station's jail cell, but was released on the afternoon of 10 January due to a lack of reason to keep him detained over his crimes. On 10 November 1979, Katarina Jakobsson's parents reported her missing to the Malmö Police as she had not met Nilsson or their son, which was scheduled to have occurred on 8 November. Police officers visited her Almbacksgatan apartment for routine checkups in both November and December 1979. During both visits, the responding officers noticed subtle changes, such as a changed door lock, that suggested Jakobsson was still alive. Together with the help of a locksmith and Jakobsson's father, the police forcibly entered her apartment once more on 16 January 1980, upon which they discovered Hjalmarsson hiding in the bedroom closet. After initially explaining that he was there to look after Jakobsson's apartment, he was once more promptly arrested and held in a holding cell awaiting questioning. He was now considered a suspect in the disappearance of Jakobsson.

=== Investigation and confession ===
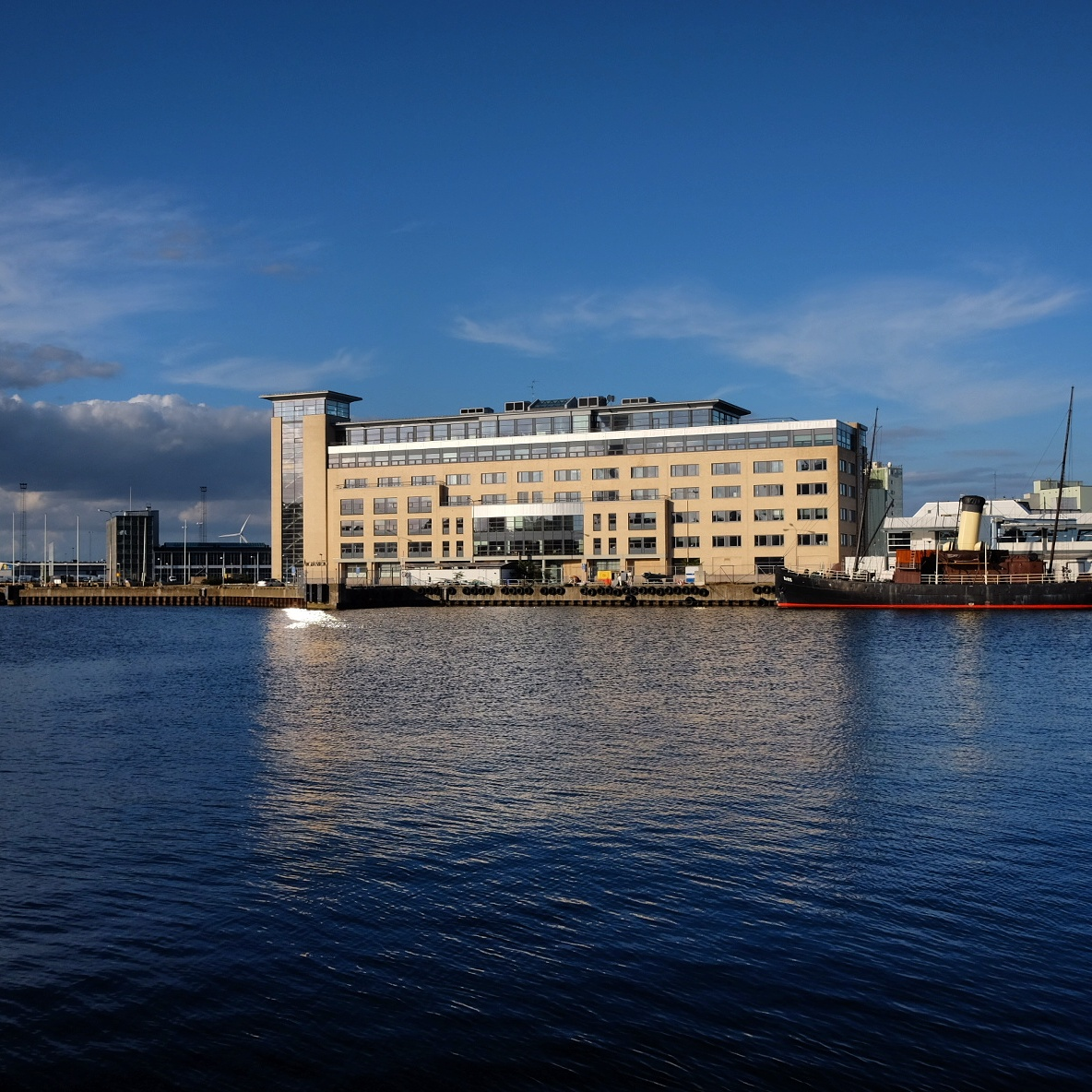
Jakobsson's body parts were discovered by divers in front of Smörkontrollen in Inre hamnen.

During the initial questioning regarding the disappearance of Jakobsson, Hjalmarsson claimed she was still alive, having been at his Kornettsgatan apartment during "the past three nights. On 17 January 1980, the Malmö police once more obtained a search warrant for Hjalmarsson's apartment, this time treating it as a potential crime scene. The police found several ties to Jakobsson there, including her television set. The pieces of meat in the refrigerator were sent to the Swedish National Board of Forensic Medicine's offices in Lund, where professor Gerhard Voigt concluded that the pieces were flesh, tissue and a liver which was similar in size to a human woman's. Voight sent samples of the meat to the National Swedish Laboratory of Forensic Science in Linköping, who confirmed that they were human remains on 18 January. When several paper notes in Hjalmarsson's apartment were analyzed, the police found a train ticket which linked him to the burglary of his mother's house, alongside several postcards referencing Jakobsson and her pension, which Hjalmarsson had claimed.

On 20 January 1980, after police found notes detailing the dismembering of Jakobsson's corpse and weighing of her bodyparts, Hjalmarsson admitted to having murdered, dismembered and cannibalised Jakobsson. He proceeded to give the interrogators a thorough, detailed description of events during the night of 7 November 1979. His confession was largely complete, with exception of some amnesia in between the murder of Jakobsson and the dismemberment of her body. Hjalmarsson's interrogation lasted roughly four hours, and ended at 15:00 on the same afternoon. In addition to admitting to the crime, he also revealed the location of Jakobsson's skeletal remains in the sea and her hair, located in a plastic bag in his wardrobe.

In late January 1980, the Malmö fire department's divers start diving in the area of inre hamnen Hjalmarsson described. According to one of the divers, Andras Talpai, the search was "made easy" by the ferry traffic in the port, as the constant "whipping of propellers" kept vegetation away, with Talpai comparing the seabed to parquet flooring. As it was January, there was no algae present in the water, which also helped in the search for the remains. Almost all of Jakobsson's skeletal remains were recovered from the seabed, with the exception of a few vertebrae, forearm, most of her teeth, and her right hand. One of her molar teeth was found, which was crucial in the identification of her remains. In addition, traces of O Type blood were found in the sink of Hjalmarsson's apartment, which matched Jakobsson's blood. One of her teeth amalgams was also found in the sink trap.

=== Trial ===
Before the trial, the Malmö District Court decided that Hjalmarsson should undergo a psychiatric evaluation according to Swedish law. This initially began with a statement by doctor Olof Hellgren, who stated Hjalmarsson's mental situation "had confirmed that a psychosis had evolved", transferring Hjalmarsson from a jail in Malmö to the St. Lars psychiatric hospital in neighboring Lund for further testing. It was determined during the four months he was in the hospital that he was not suffering from any physical brain injury. According to Psychiatrist Barbro Roslund, Hjalmarsson spoke about the murders "coldly" and "just like it was meat he had purchased in an ICA store". Hjalmarsson was diagnosed with Schizophrenia during his initial stay at the hospital on 12 June 1980, and also received an Asperger syndrome diagnosis later in life.

Bengt Hjalmarsson's trial started on 18 June 1980, where he was represented by criminal defense lawyer Börje Svedberg, who, due to a certification issued by a psychiatric doctor, requested that "Hjalmarsson did not need to be present during the rest of his own hearing", as there was a "serious risk Hjalmarsson would become aggressive" or suffer from other mental issues if he were to be interrogated in court. Although Prosecutor Ragnar Emanuelsson argued against this, Judge Ivar Adell relented and transferred Hjalmarsson back to his psychiatric care for the remainder of his hearing as "Hjalmarsson did not verbally respond to anybody in court". The rest of the trial in absentia lasted roughly five hours, during which both the prosecutors and Svedberg argued for psychiatric care as a penalty. On 25 June 1980, the final verdict was announced; Hjalmarsson was sentenced to indefinitive closed psychiatric care at St. Lars hospital. Hjalmarsson did not appeal his sentence.

== Perpetrator ==
Erik Gyllenfjäder
- Gyllenfjäder in an undated police photo.
- Born: Bengt Erik Hjalmarsson; 18 March 1949; Helsingborg, Sweden
- Died: 12 January 2015 (aged 65); Malmö, Sweden
- Other name: Erik Ludvig Gyllenfjäder
- Criminal penalty: Forensic psychiatric care
- Partners: Katarina Jakobsson (1979; her murder)

=== Early life ===
Bengt Erik Hjalmarsson was born on 18 March 1949 in the Scanian town of Helsingborg, Sweden. His parents divorced fairly early during his childhood, and he did not keep in close contact with his two younger siblings, as they did not share his interest in philosophy and books.

As a child, Hjalmarsson was described as intelligent, and he skipped a class in elementary school. At pre-school, he was determined to be aggressive in playing to the extent that he was sent to a psychiatric evaluation in Borås. He was later examined by nationally famous doctor Bertil Söderling in 1956, who suggested skull trauma to be present, even though x-ray scans did not show anything wrong. He left school with relatively high grades, despite frequent bouts of truancy during his later time at secondary gymnasium school.

In 1971, Hjalmarsson started serving his military training as part of Sweden's mandatory conscription at the Norrbotten Regiment in Boden, where he was stationed as a Jäger soldier. However, Hjalmarsson deserted after failing to return home from a leave, as he was not comfortable with his stationing. By the time of his arrest for burglary in 1980, the crime of deserting had been prescripted due to a 1975 discharge issued by a psychiatric doctor in Lund at the request of Hjalmarsson's father. At the time, Hjalmarsson was living off of student welfare fraud, falsifying signatures claiming that he succeeded in several courses at Lund University. By 1975 he was earning 10,000 Swedish kronor annually through fraud, a figured which had doubled by 1979. In 1976, Hjalmarsson moved to Malmö into an apartment from which he eventually got evicted during the spring of 1979 for failure to pay rent. With the help of his father, Hjalmarsson moved into his new apartment on Kornettsgatan 20B in June 1979.

=== Time in psychiatric care and death ===
Bengt Hjalmarsson legally changed his name to Erik Ludvig Gyllenfjäder, which was approved by the Swedish Intellectual Property Office on 6 November 1986. Gyllenfjäder received several permissions from the psychiatric hospital in St. Lars to continue his studies at Lund University, where he studied Latin.

On 26 March 1992, Gyllenfjäder was arrested in his Lund apartment due to threatening letters he had sent to female students at the university in between February and March 1992; these contained several pornographic images, poetry, and threats in the Latin and Swedish languages which made references to drowning in a bathtub, alluding to his own murder of Jakobsson. Gyllenfjäder denied involvement during police interrogation, and the case was dismissed. Gyllenfjäder was, however, barred from further studies at Lund University.

During his time in psychiatric care, Gyllenfjäder was described as having an eidetic memory. According to psychiatrist Sten Levander in 2004, Gyllenfjäder "had not changed whatsoever" despite having spent 23 years in psychiatric care, and was said to lack empathy for others despite his intelligence. He was permitted extended leaves from the psychiatric hospital in February 2004. The following month, his leaves were withdrawn and he was once more institutionalized after he broke Lund University's restraining order against him. Gyllenfjäder returned to national prominence in December 2006, when he was once again suspected of sending threatening letters, this time to various journalists, including Joakim Palmkvist, and Professor Anders Piltz. Palmkvist interpreted it as a death threat. After the year 2010, Gyllenfjäder was "essentially a free man", living anonymously in an apartment in Kroksbäck, Malmö, where he died on 12 January 2015 at the age of 65. His cause of death was not released to the general public, but it did not include criminal intent, causing Palmkvist to speculate that it was either illness or suicide.

== See also ==
- List of incidents of cannibalism
- List of solved missing person cases: 1950–1999
