= Ernst Stenhammar =

Swedish architect

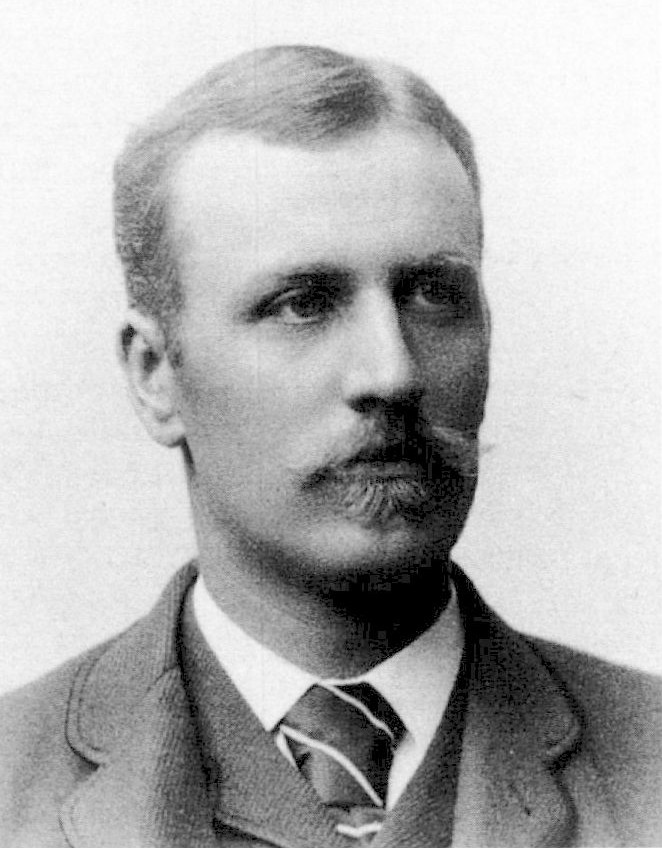
Ernst Stenhammar

Ernst Wilhelm Emanuel Stenhammar (26 March 1859 – 9 March 1927) was a Swedish architect. He was active both as an independent architect and as a teacher and eventually professor of architecture in Stockholm. The main bulk of his designs as an independent architect were made for banks and hospitals.

== Biography ==
Ernst Stenhammar was born and raised in Stockholm. He was the son of the architect and composer Per Ulrik Stenhammar (1829-1875) and brother of the composer Wilhelm Stenhammar (1871–1927).

He studied architecture at the Royal Institute of Technology under Albert Theodor Gellerstedt between 1877 and 1882. While still a student, he began an apprenticeship at the architectural firm of Magnus Isæus and also made a study trip to Paris in 1881. After finishing his studies at the Royal Institute of Technology, he continued to pursue studies in architecture at the Royal Swedish Academy of Arts under Claes Grundström. He finished his studies at the Academy in 1884; in 1883 he made another study trip to Gotland, to study the churches of Gotland and the architecture of Visby. He also began to teach at the Academy himself, together with Agi Lindgren and his friend Ferdinand Boberg. After leaving the Academy in 1884 he returned to the Royal Institute of Technology as a teacher. He continued to be active as a teacher of architecture until 1905 (in 1990, he was appointed professor of architecture). In parallel, he worked as an independent architect (after an initial period as an assistant to Isak Gustaf Clason). His professional career as an architect can be said to have started already in 1887.

Ernst Stenhammar has been described as a "somewhat harsh but generous and with a drastic sense of humour". Like his father and brother he was fond of music. He was married with Edla Maria Carolina Anna von Schoultz between 1895 and 1910, and in 1911 married for the second time with actress Anna Flygare-Stenhammar. With his second wife, he had three children.

== Work ==
The first buildings that Ernst Stenhammar designed were residential multi-storeyed buildings, especially on Östermalm in Stockholm. Among his first commissions are two large houses in Neo-Renaissance style on Karlaplan square. In 1895 he began to work on Centralpalatset, a more independently conceived building. It was the first building in Stockholm purely dedicated to offices and stores. The aesthetic emphasis on the building's elements of construction was a novelty and inspired by contemporary American architecture. The building attracted positive criticism at a time when the ideals where shifting away from earlier historicist and eclectic ideals to more emphasis on personal expression.

Stenhammar received another prestigious commission with the design of the Grand Hotel Royal (the backside of the Grand Hotel) in 1909. Also this building had a positive reception, and was praised e.g. by Ragnar Östberg. Other prestigious commissions included Villa Foresta on Lidingö (finished 1910) and the department store Myrstedt & Stern (inspired by the Wertheim department store in Berlin and built in 1910). Myrstedt & Stern on Kungsgatan was the first building in Sweden with a building frame made entirely of reinforced concrete. Stenhammar also designed a number of private villas.

The main bulk of Stenhammar's oeuvre was however bank buildings and hospitals. The first bank building designed by him was a palatial, Neo-Renaissance building in Umeå in 1893. A bank building in Stockholm designed in 1902 made innovative use of a glass-covered bank hall and was positively reviewed e.g. by Torben Grut. Many of the banks designed by Ernst Stenhammar are characterised by the use of dark bricks and granite, reminiscent of the contemporary National Romantic style. A typical example is the bank designed by Stenhammar in Karlstad. In 1907, Stenhammar received his first commission for the design of a hospital. He would eventually establish himself as an accomplished designer of several hospitals. Stenhammar introduced new and more practical but also more complex plans for hospitals, buildings which at the same time displayed an artistic ambition.

== Gallery ==
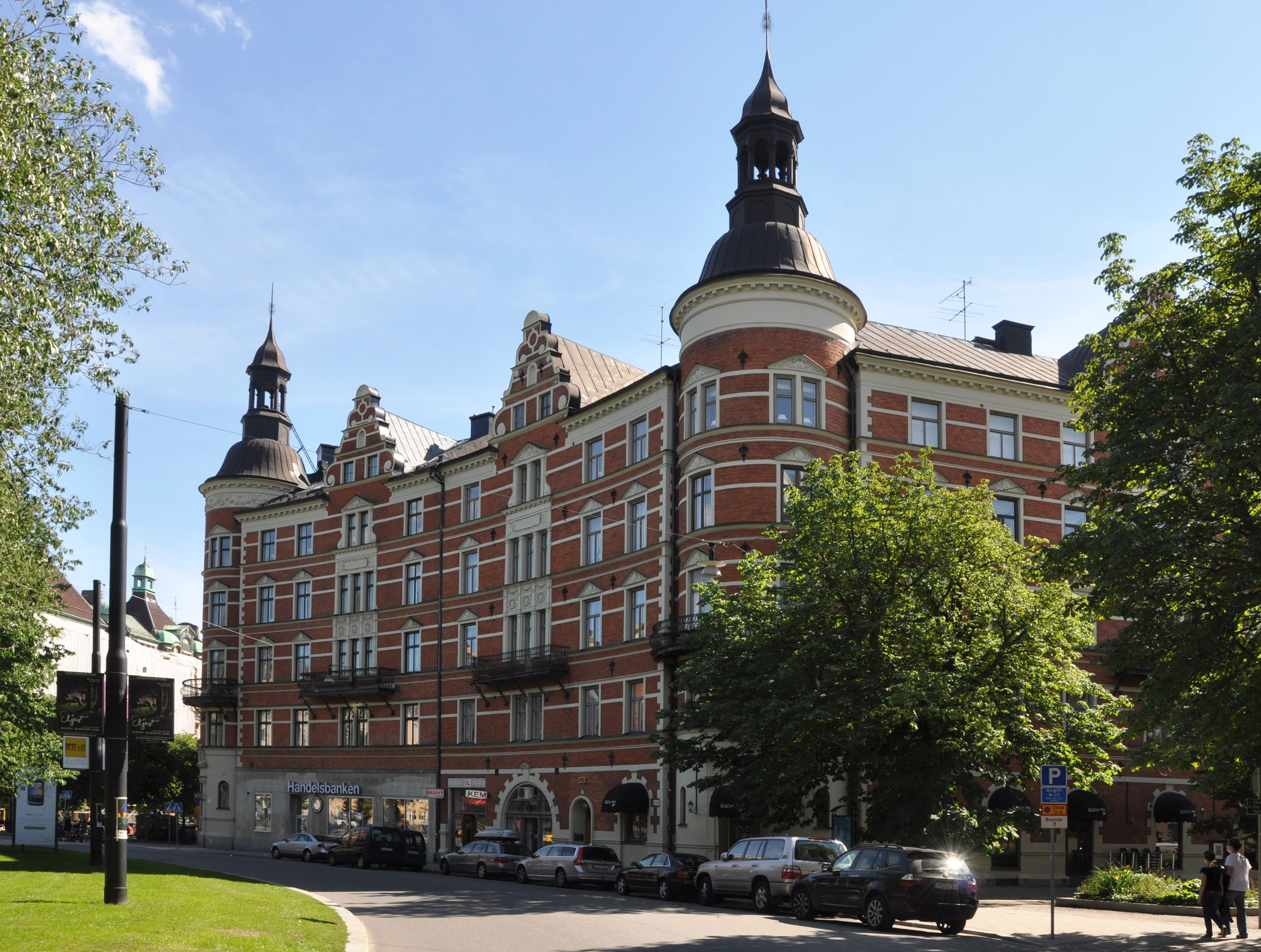
Building on Karlaplan, Stockholm (1888-1891)

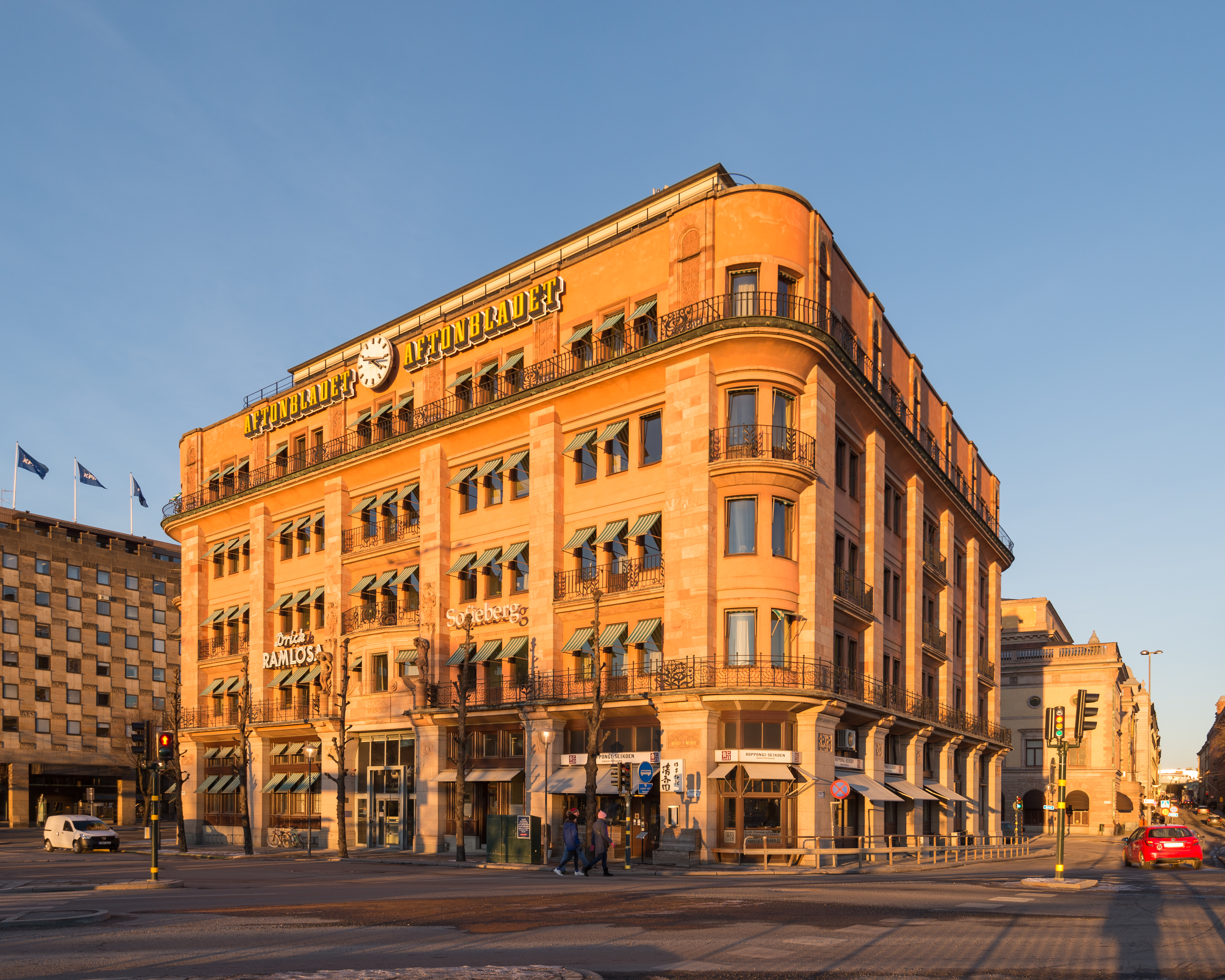
Centralpalatset, Stockholm (1895)

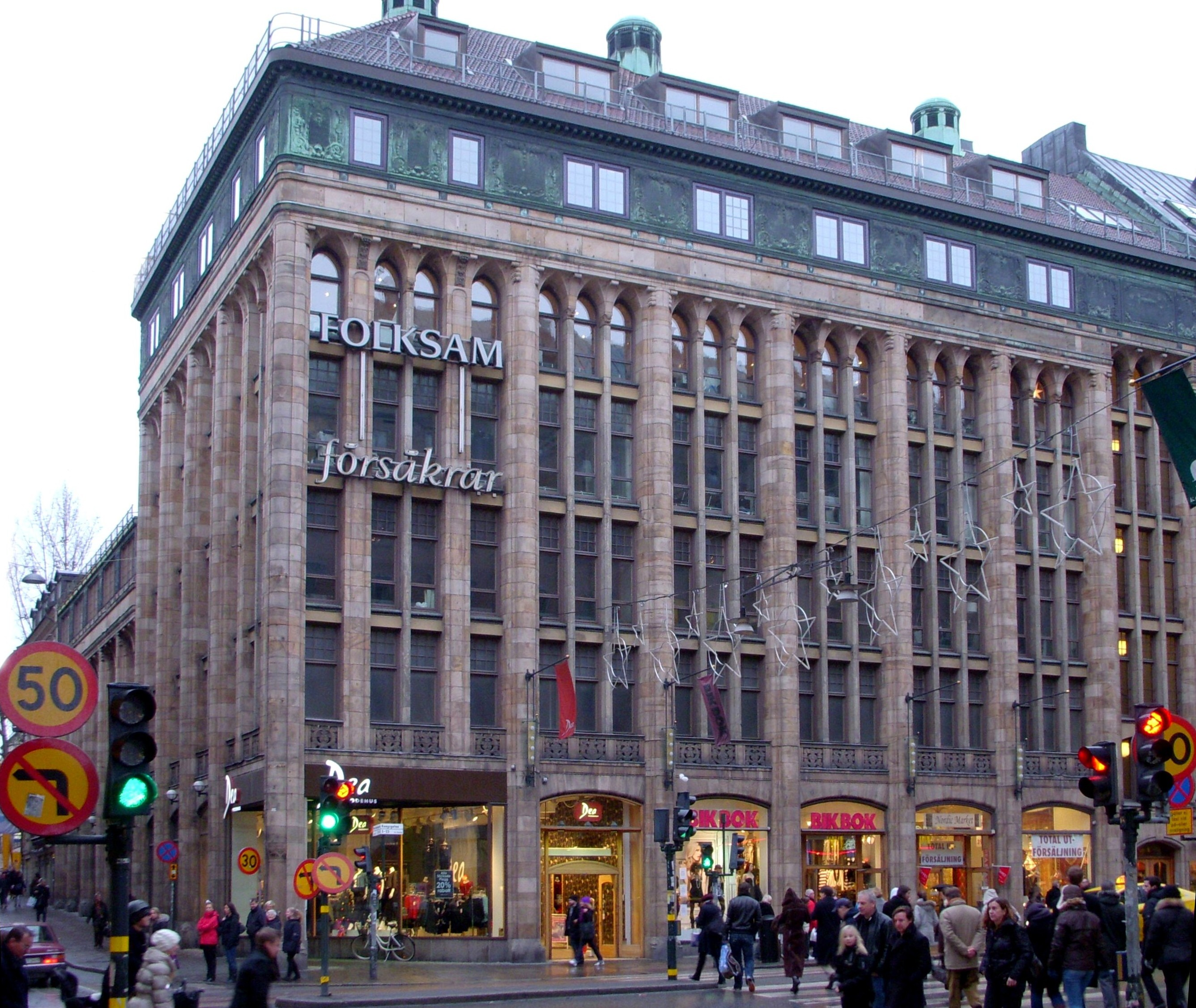
Myrstedt & Stern department store, Stockholm (1910)

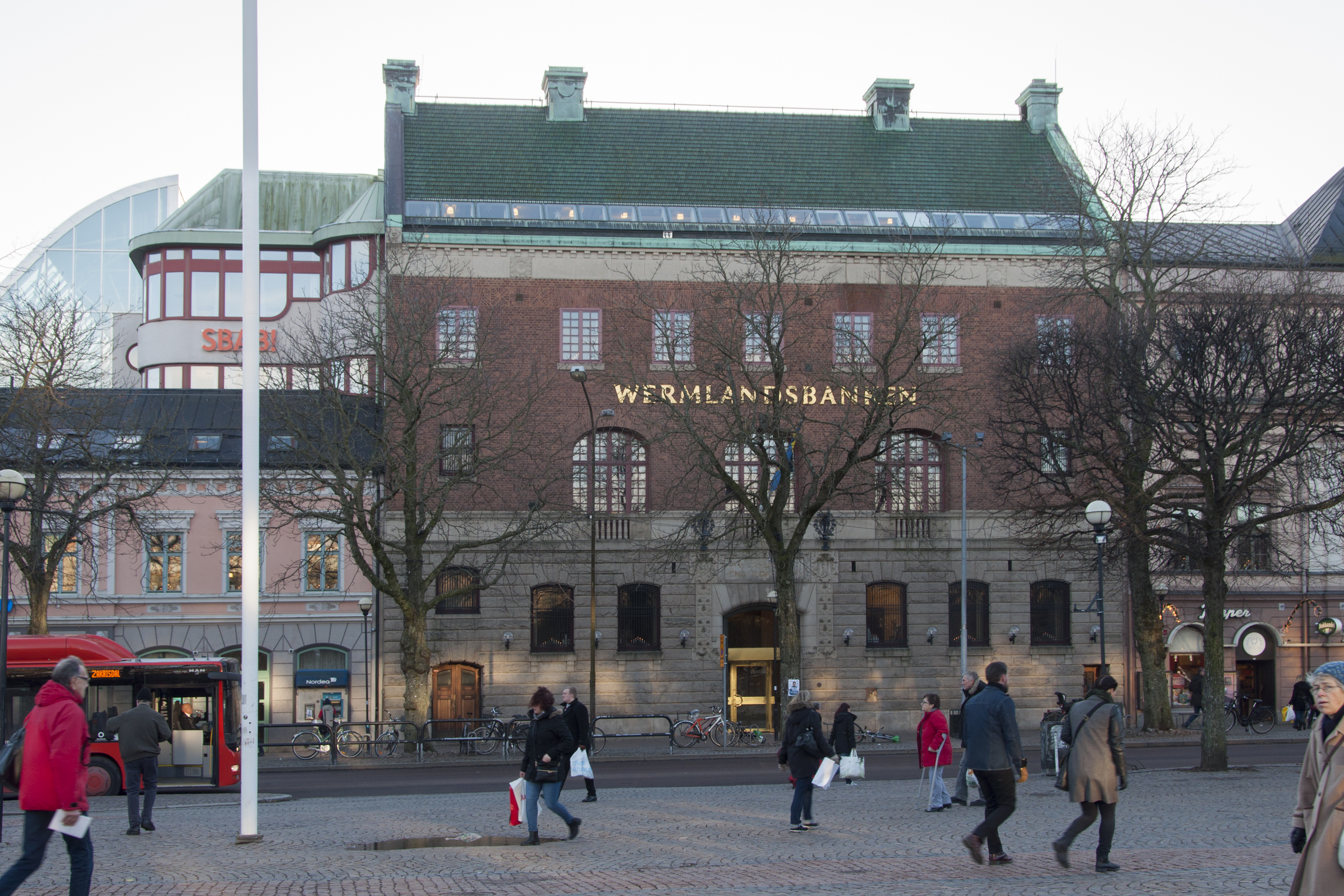
Bank in Karlstad (1908)

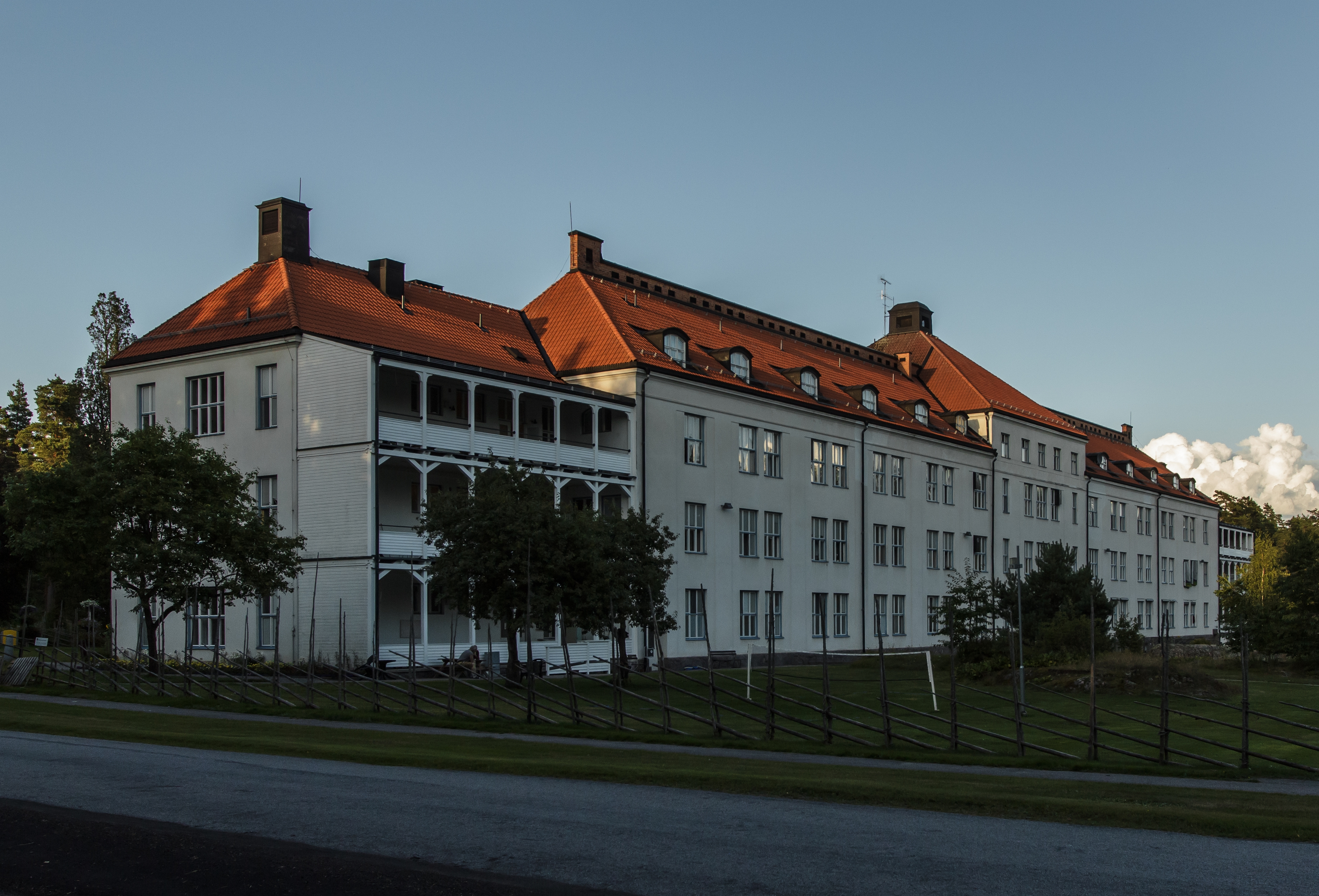
Sanatorium in Kolmården (1918)
