= Ferdinand Boberg =

Swedish architect (1860–1946)

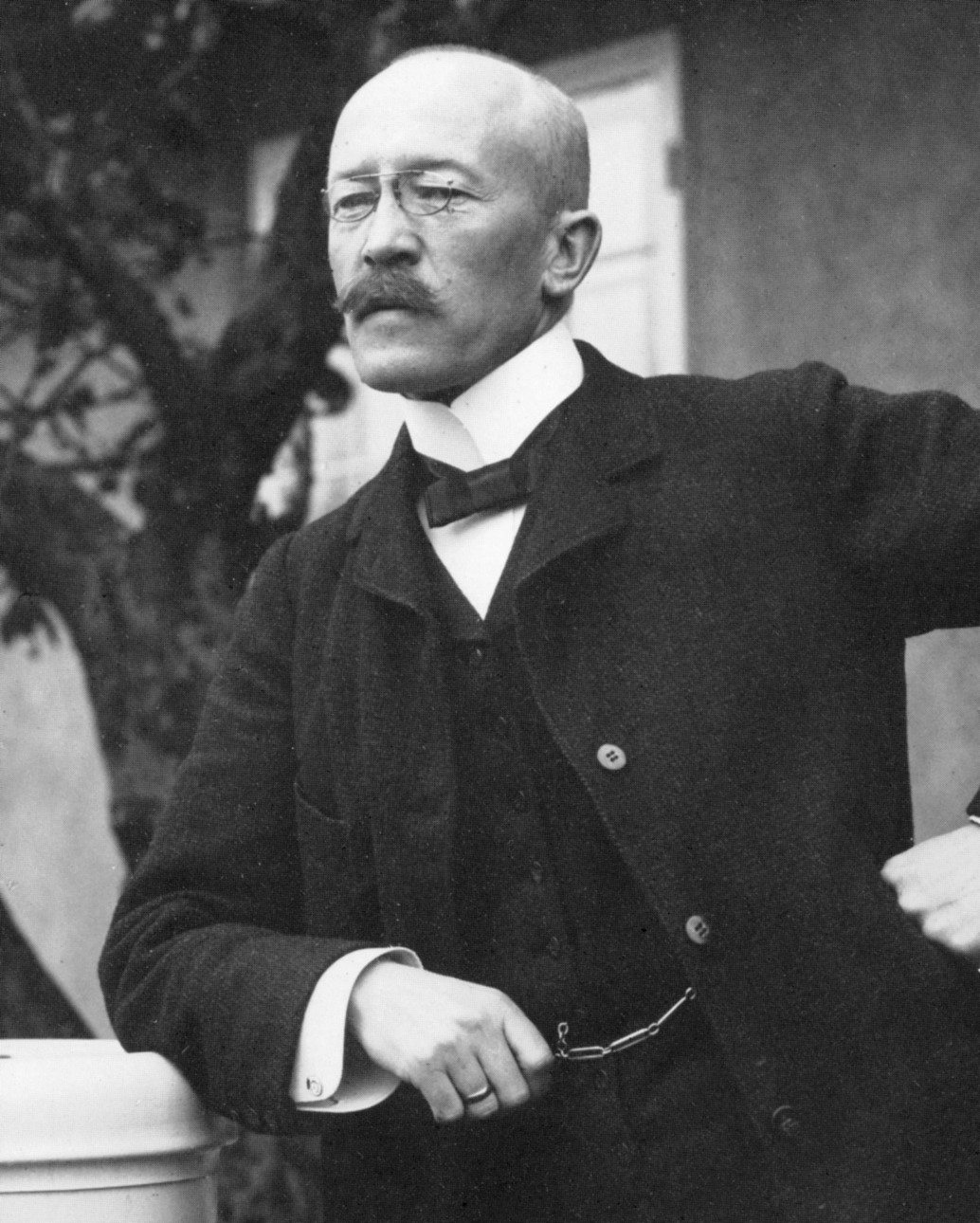
Ferdinand Boberg (1903)

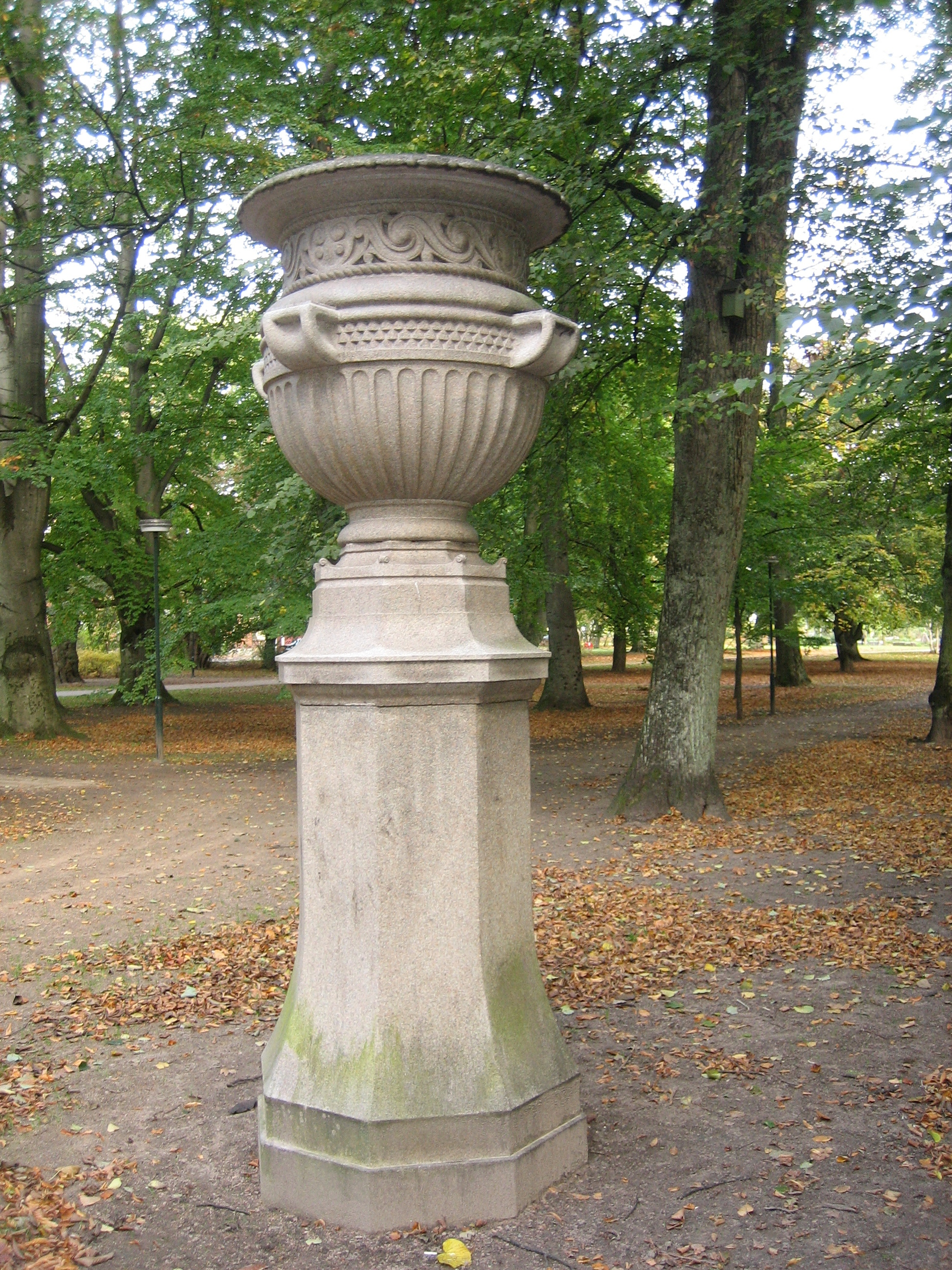
Söndrumsurnan in Halmstad

Gustaf Ferdinand Boberg (11 April 1860 – 7 May 1946) was a Swedish architect.

== Biography ==
Boberg was born in Falun. He became one of the most productive and prominent architects of Stockholm around the turn of the 20th century. Among his most famous work is an electrical plant at Björns Trädgård in Stockholm, that was inspired by Middle Eastern architecture. The building was converted in the late nineties and is now the Stockholm Mosque. He also designed Nordiska Kompaniet, the most prominent department store in Stockholm and Rosenbad which today houses the Swedish government chancellery.

Boberg's only international exhibition building that remains in existence today - the 1904 St. Louis World's Fair Swedish Pavilion - remains standing in Lindsborg, Kansas.

After retiring as an architect in 1915, Boberg and his wife Anna traveled around Sweden with the aim of preserving the cultural heritage through a book of drawings. Over 3,000 sketches were made and around 1,000 drawings were published in the volume Svenska bilder ("Swedish Images").

Boberg died in Stockholm, aged 86.

== Famous works ==
(In chronological order)

- Rosenborgshuset, Stockholm (1883–1884)
- Bergööska huset, Hallsberg (1887–1889)
- Gävle fire station, Gävle (1890–1891)
- Brunkebergsverket, Stockholm (1892)
- Grünewaldvillan, Saltsjöbaden (1893)
- Värtagasverket, (gas holder and main building), Hjorthagen, Stockholm (1893)
- Cedergrenska tornet, Stocksund, Stockholm (1896)
- Villa Tallbacken, Djursholm (1896), built for the artist Robert Thegerström
- Mosebacke water tower (1896–97)
- Central post office, Stockholm (1898–1903)
- LO-borgen, Norra Bantorget, Stockholm (1899)
- Parkudden, Stockholm (1899)
- Swedish Pavilion at the 1900 Paris World's Fair
- Central Post Office Building, Malmö (1900–1906)
- Tulestationen, Stockholm (1902–1906)
- Katarina power station, Stockholm (1903), now Stockholm Mosque, inaugurated in 2000
- Värtaverket, (turbine halls and offices), Hjorthagen, Stockholm (1903)
- Swedish Pavilion at the 1904 St. Louis World's Fair, later moved to Lindsborg, Kansas
- Byström's villa, Djurgården, Stockholm (1905)
- Thiel Gallery, Djurgården, Stockholm (1905), home of the banker Ernest Thiel, now art museum
- Waldemarsudde, Djurgården (1905–1913), built for Prince Eugen who was also an artist, now museum
- NK-villan, built for the Industrial Fair in Norrköping 1906, moved to Nyköping 1907
- Stora Tullhuset, Stockholm (1906–1910). Now home to Fotografiska Stockholm
- Nobelpalatset, Stockholm (1906–1911)
- Villa Arneborg, Trosa (1907)
- Oakhill, Djurgården (1910)
- Uppenbarelsekyrkan (1913)
- Bjertorp slott, Varaslätten (1914)
- Margareta Pavilion at the 1914 Baltic Exhibition in Malmö
- Nordiska Kompaniet, NK department store, Stockholm (1915)
- Villa Vintra, his own home on Djurgården 1903 to 1925
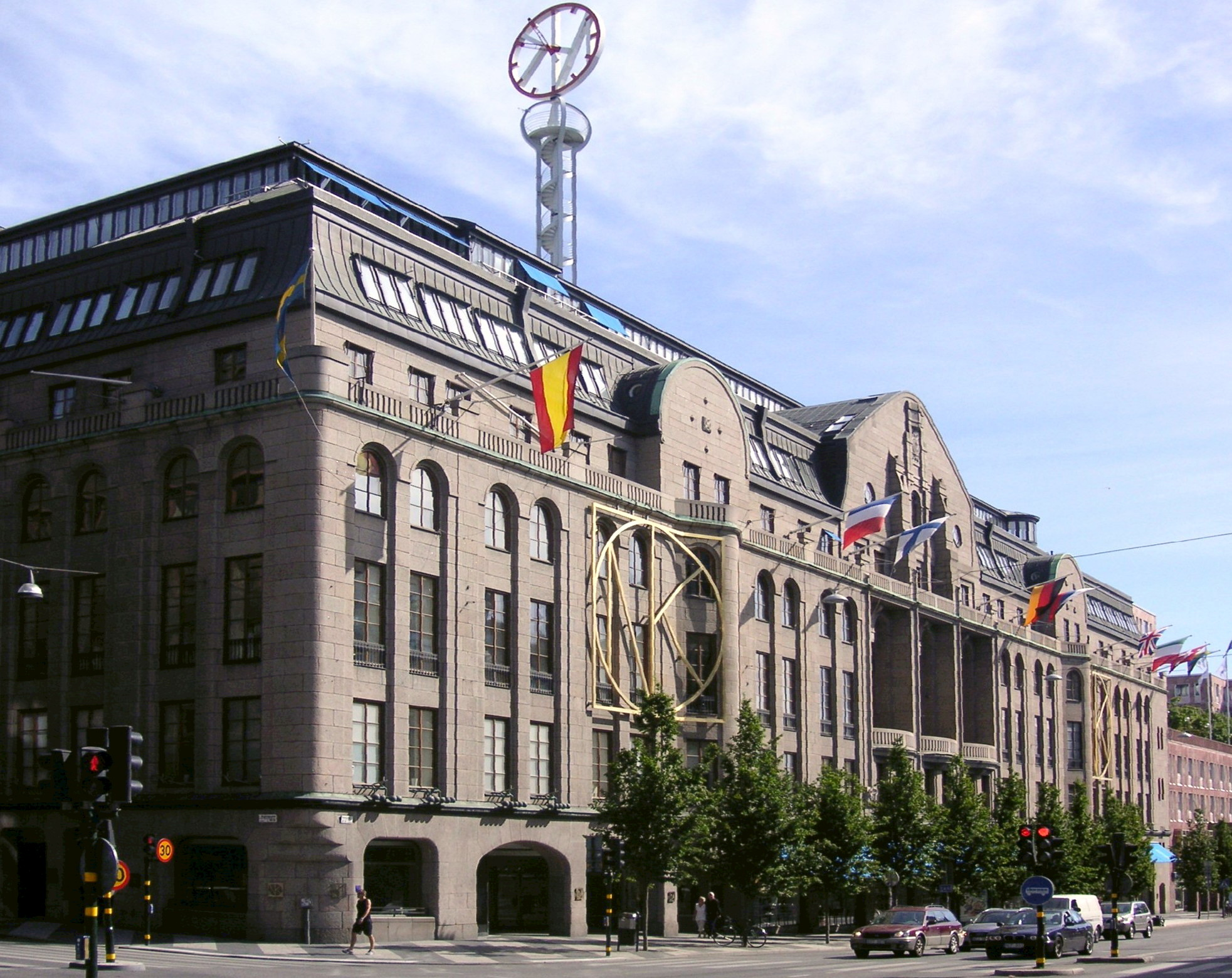
Nordiska Kompaniet department store in Stockholm

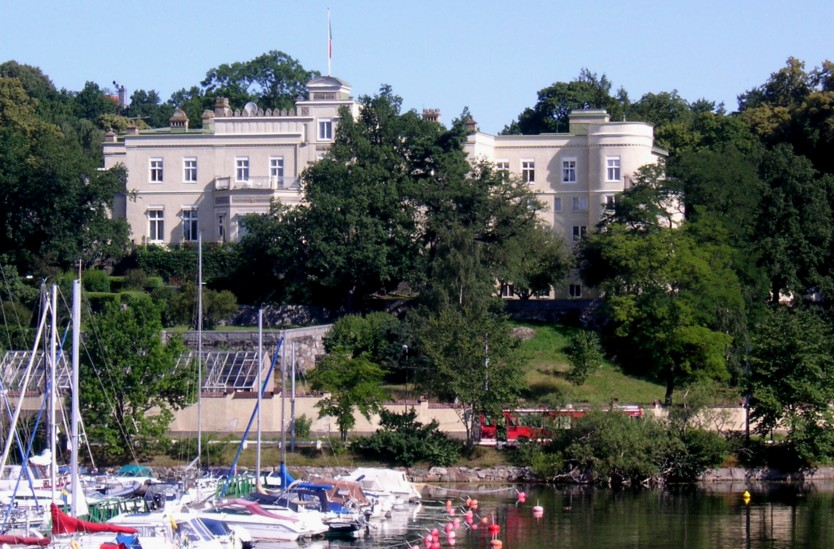
Oakhill: Italian embassy in Stockholm

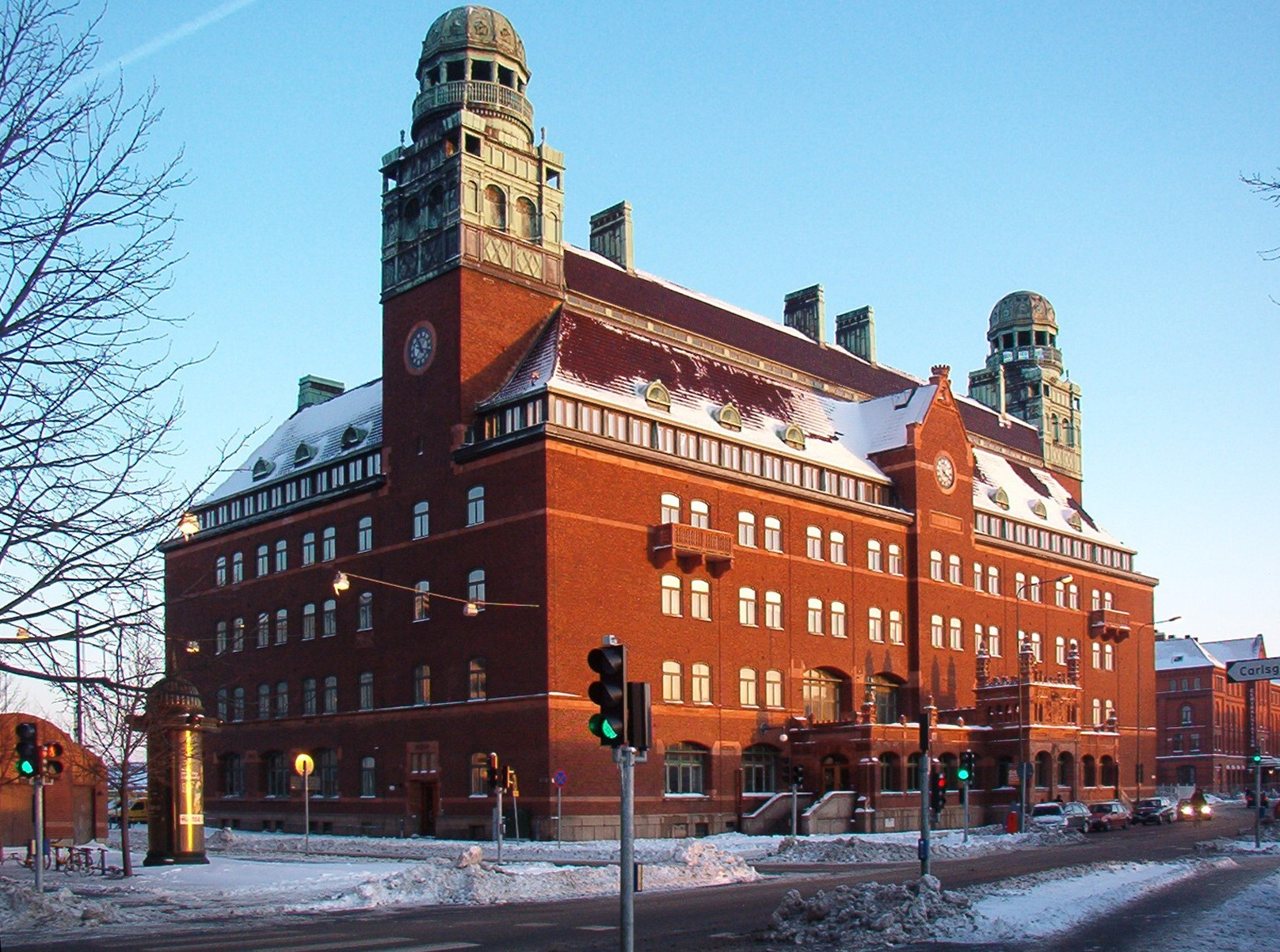
Central Post Office building in Malmö

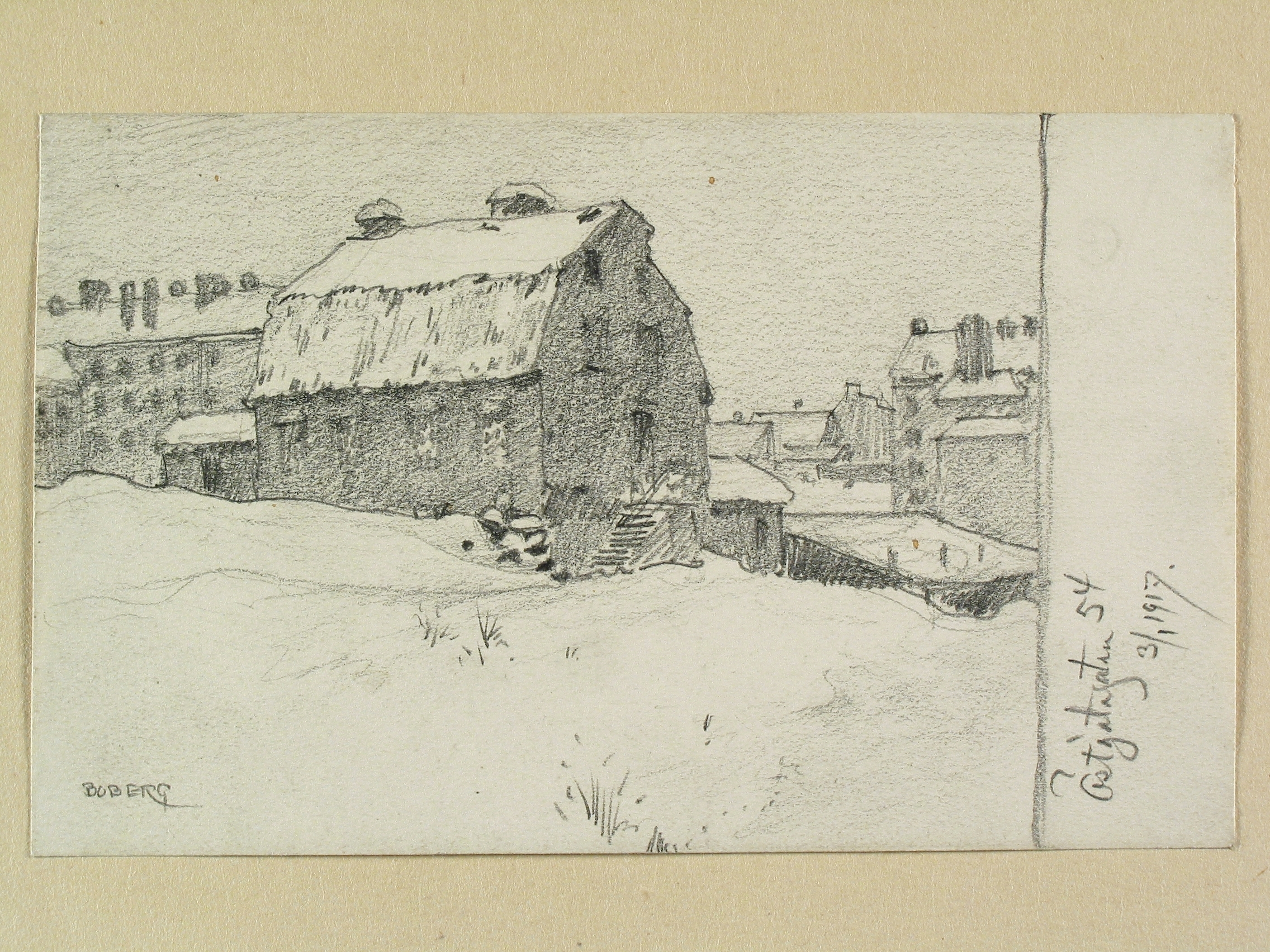
A building in Stockholm, sketched by Ferdinand Boberg in 1917 as part of the project Svenska bilder.
