= Spy Museum =

Spy museum refers to a museum that uses spying and espionage as its core content.

Spy museums include:

- CIA Museum, a spy museum in the CIA Headquarters, Virginia, United States
- International Spy Museum, in Washington D.C., United States
- KGB Espionage Museum, in New York, United States (formerly KGB Spy Museum)
- National Cryptologic Museum, in Maryland, United States
- Spy Museum, in Tampere, Finland
- Spy Museum Berlin, in Berlin, Germany
- Spyscape, a spy museum in New York, United States

== See also ==
Category:Espionage museums
