= Police ranks of Sweden =

Police ranks of Sweden are the police ranks used by the Swedish Police Authority.

== 2022- ==
In 2022, the new Career and Development Paths (Karriär- och utvecklingsvägar, KUV) system was introduced with the aim of, among other things, increasing salaries, including changes to police rank designations. This reform introduced an amount of new ranks and levels. For example, the Police Constable rank has been split into five levels (Amended by PMFS 2022:10). These rank designations became effective as of 2023.

The old ranks are still in use alongside the new ranks, as the new rank reform currently only benefit a limited amount of positions, including patrol officers.

The ranks currently in use by the Swedish Police, from top to bottom, are as following:

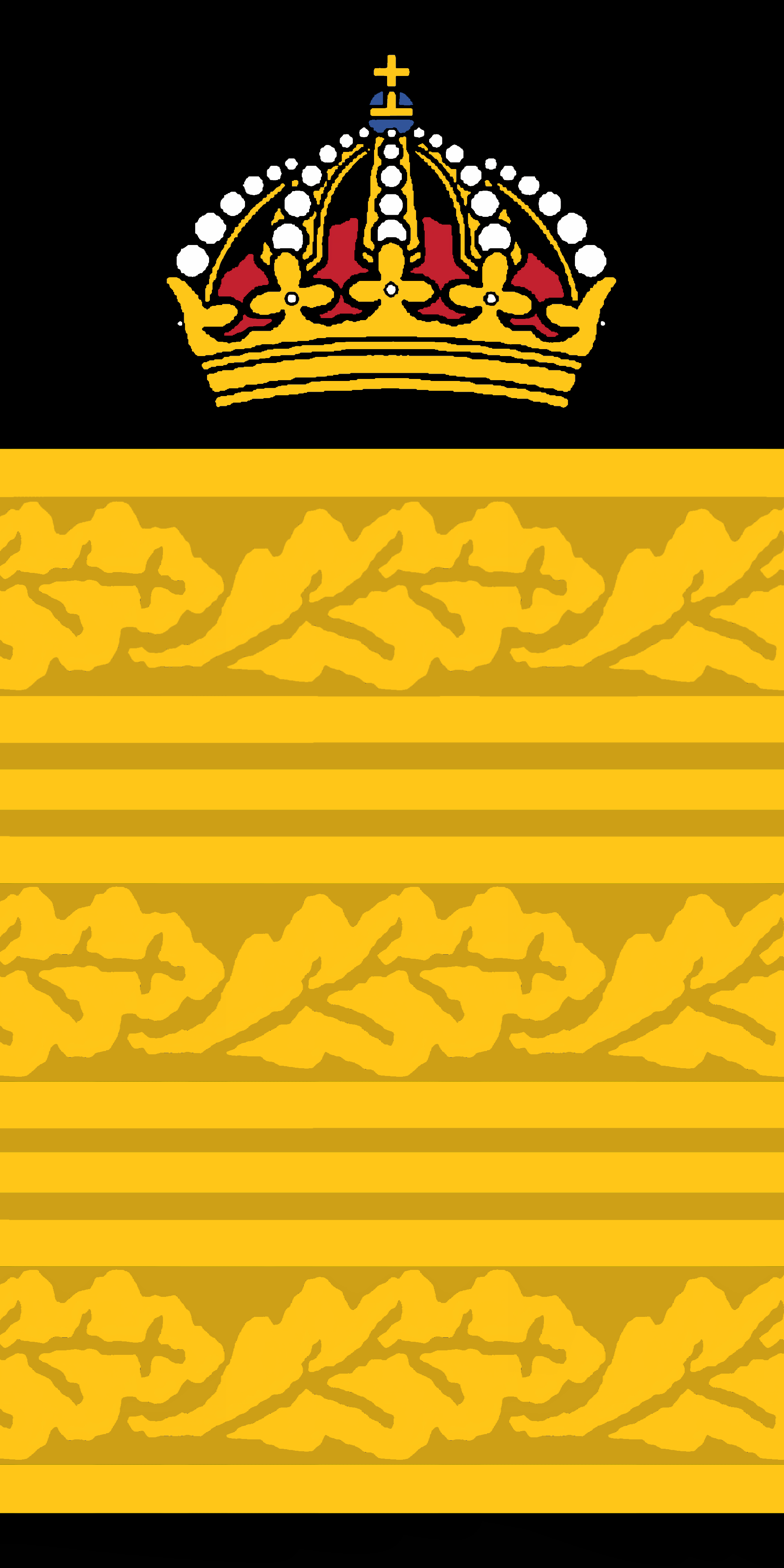
National Police Chief, Security Police Chief (Rikspolischef, Säkerhetspolischef)

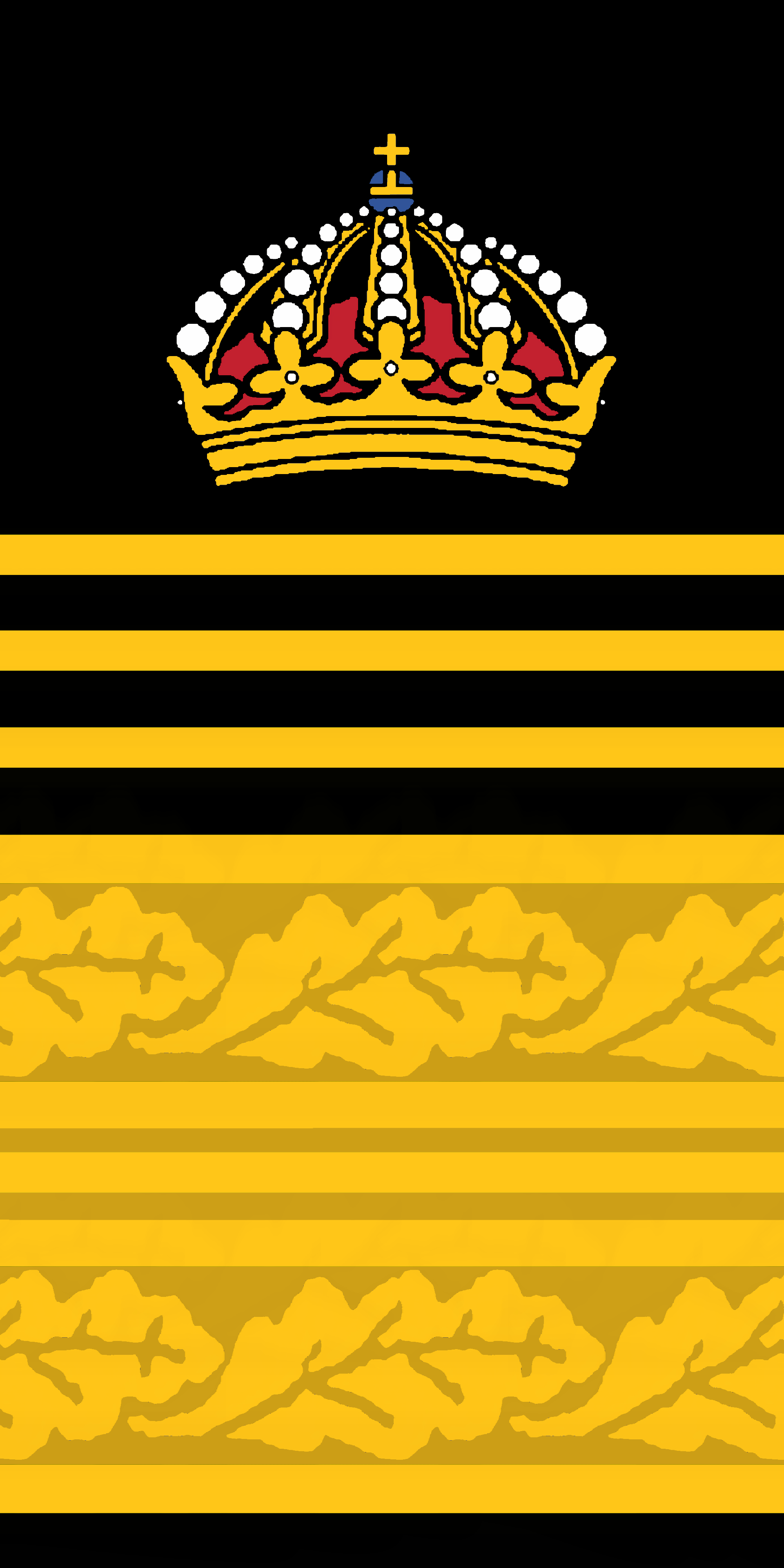
Deputy Chief of the Security Police (Biträdande säkerhetspolischef)

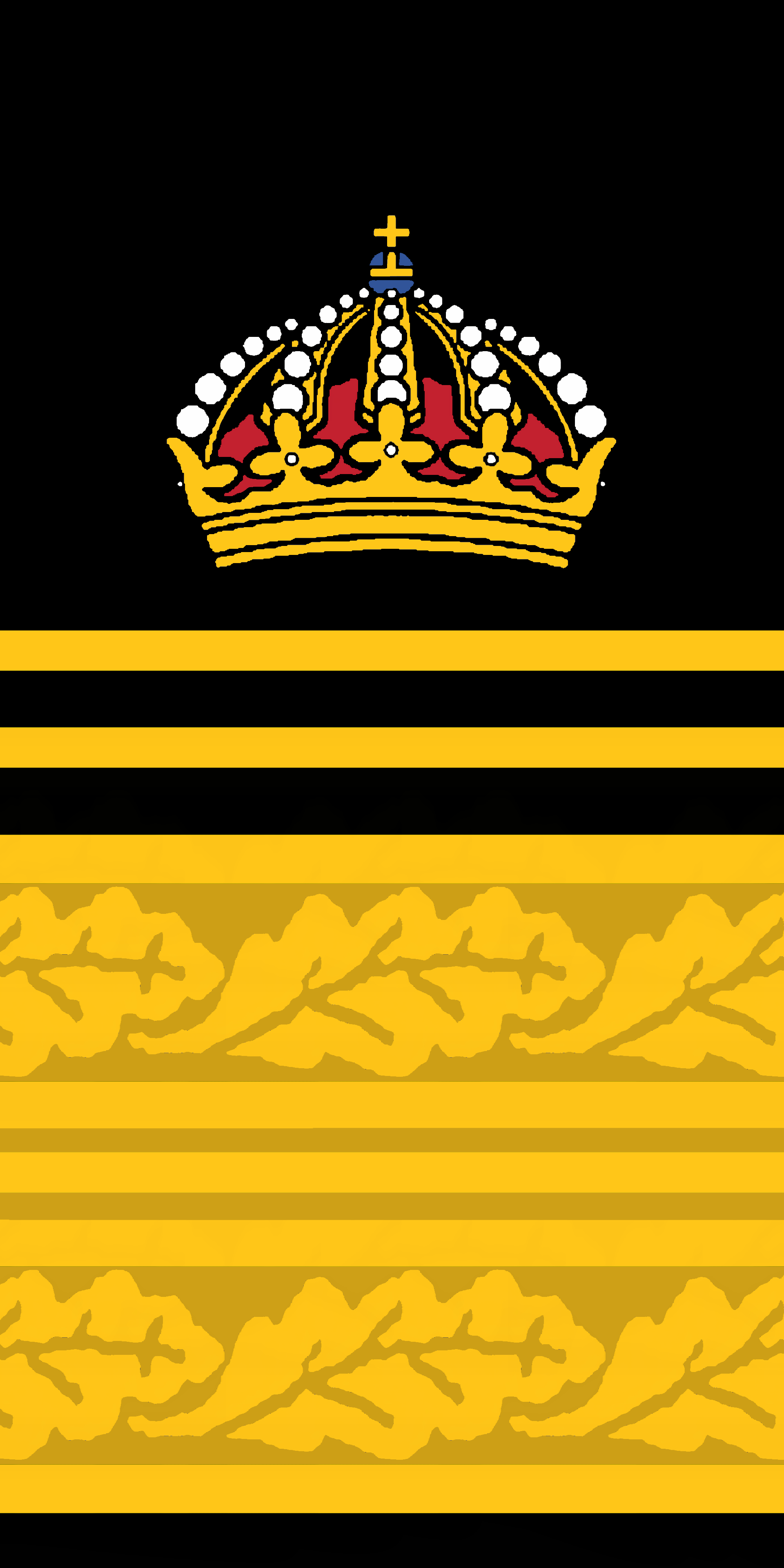
Police Director (Regional Police Chief, Department Chief, or after special appointment) (Polisdirektör)

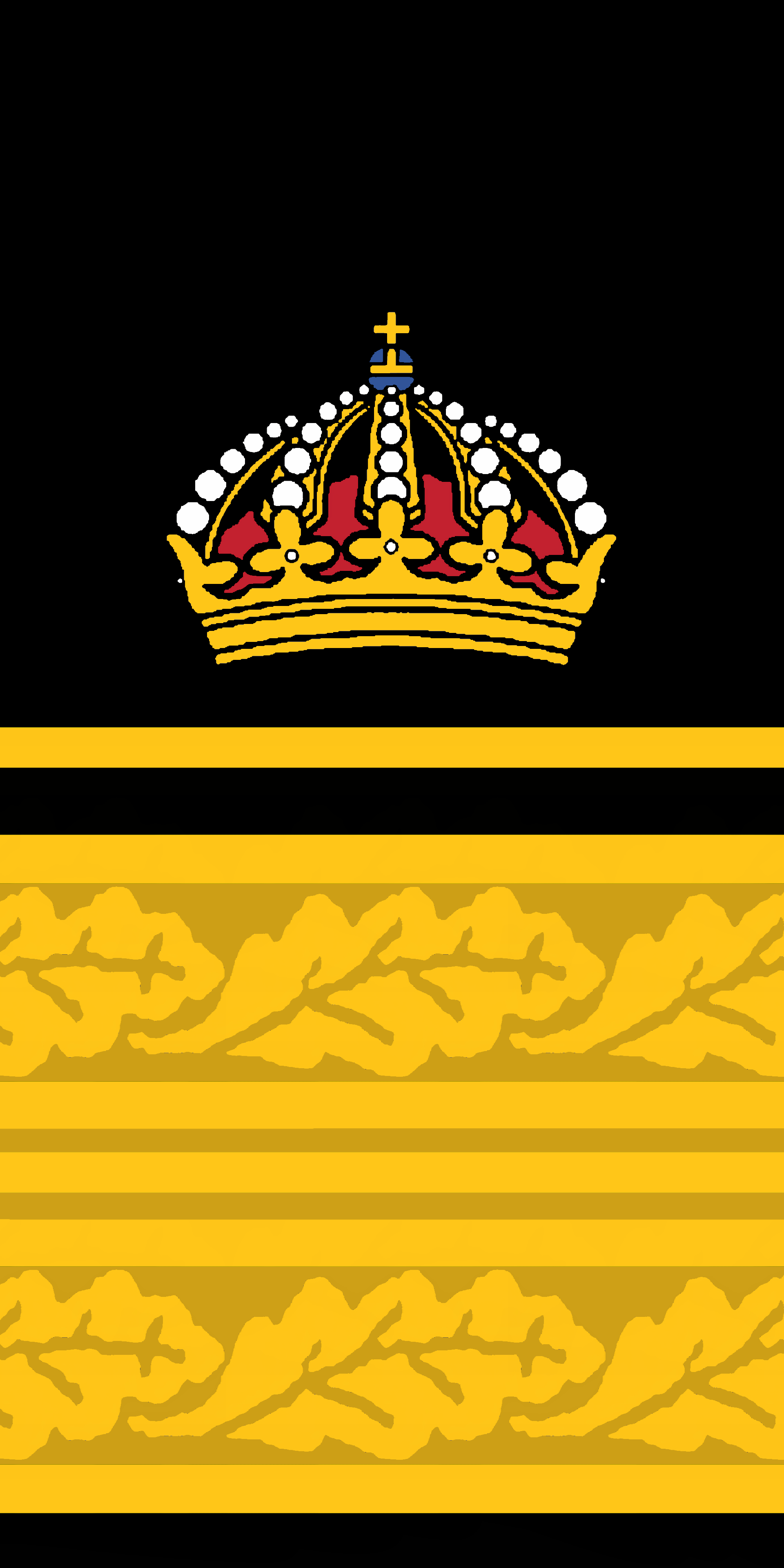
Assistant Police Director (Deputy regional Police Chief, Deputy department Chief, or after special appointment) (Biträdande polisdirektör)

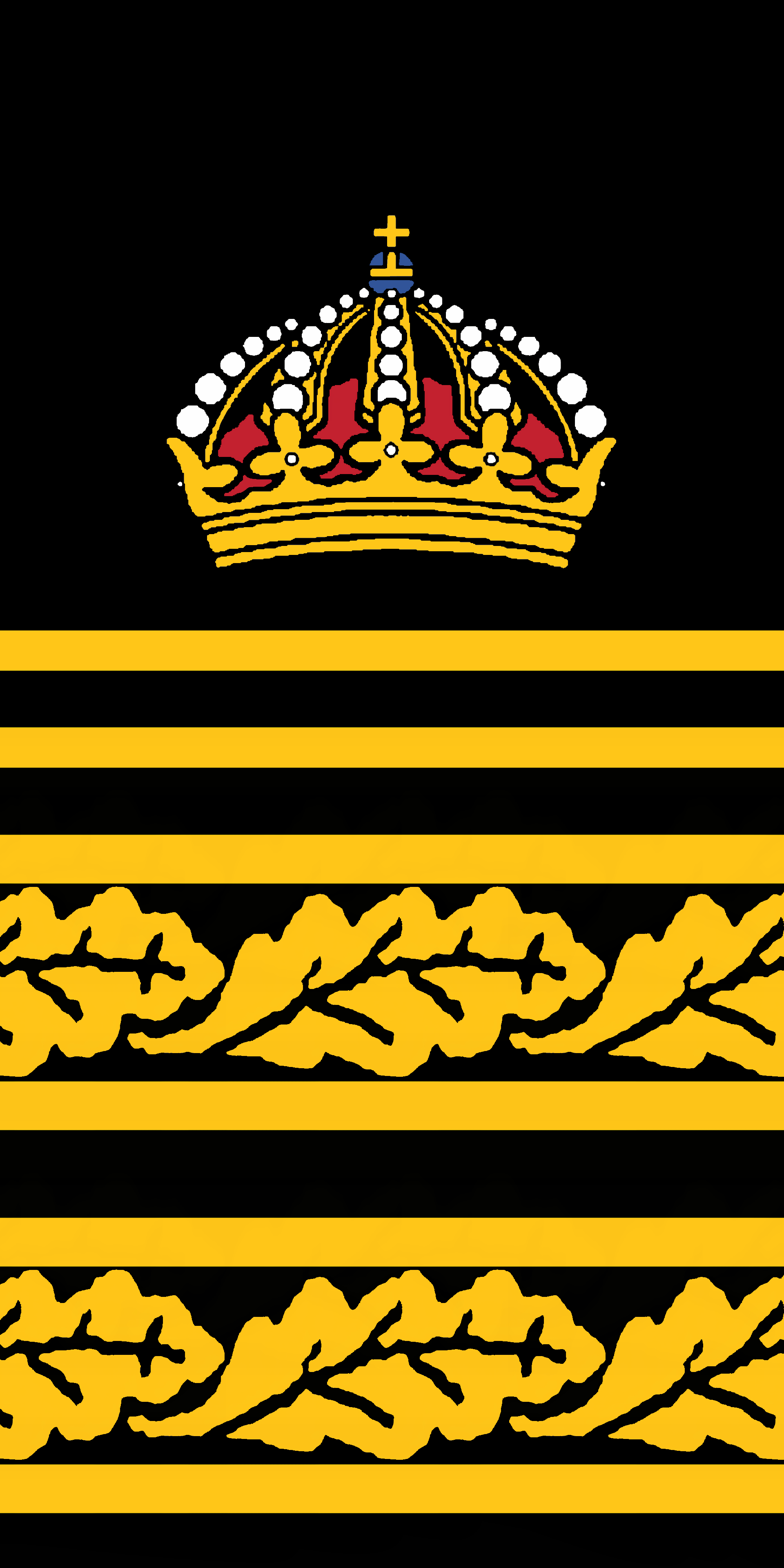
Police Master (Chief of police area, or after special appointment) (Polismästare)

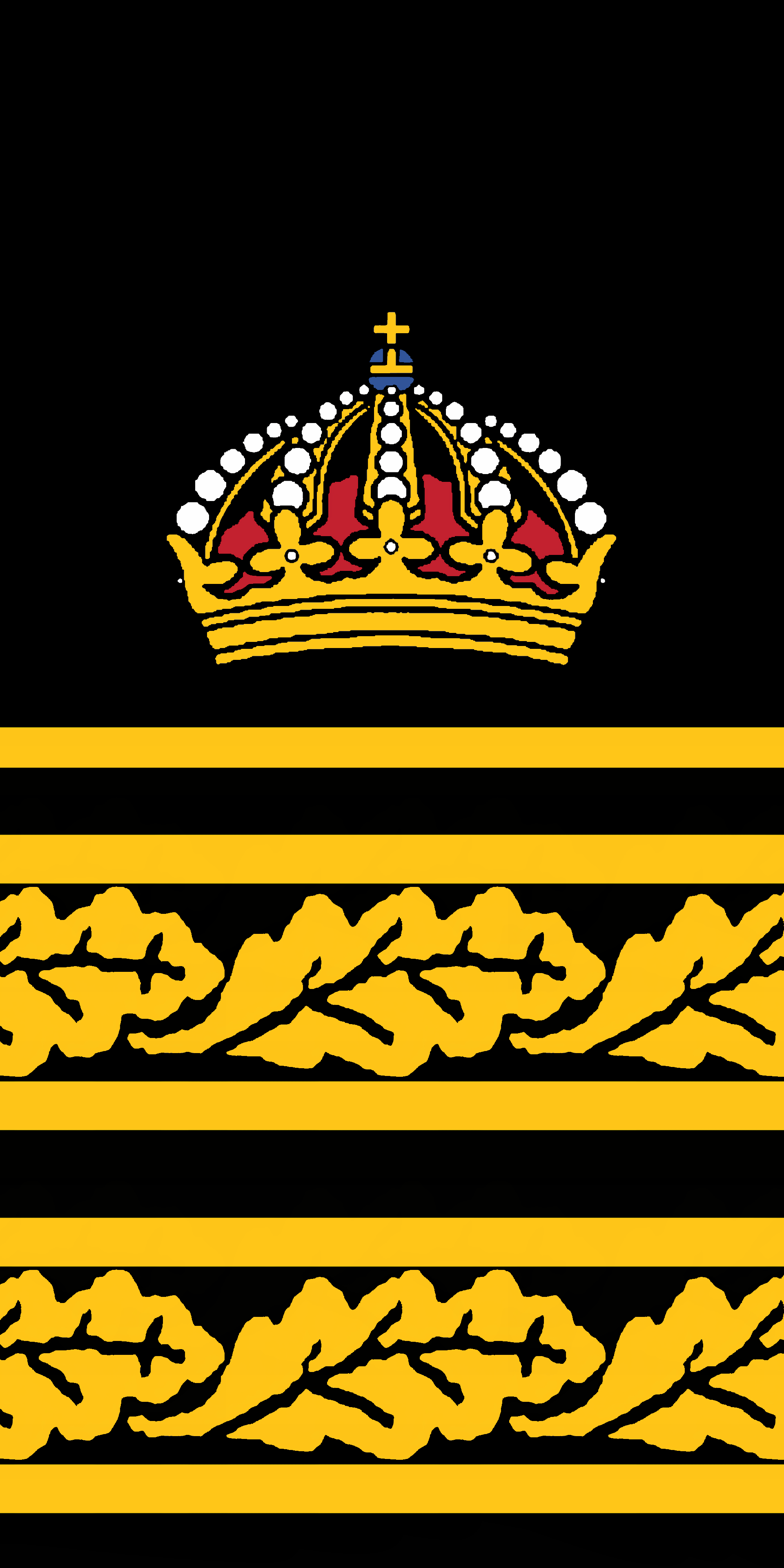
Police Master (Deputy chief of police area, or after special appointment) (Polismästare)

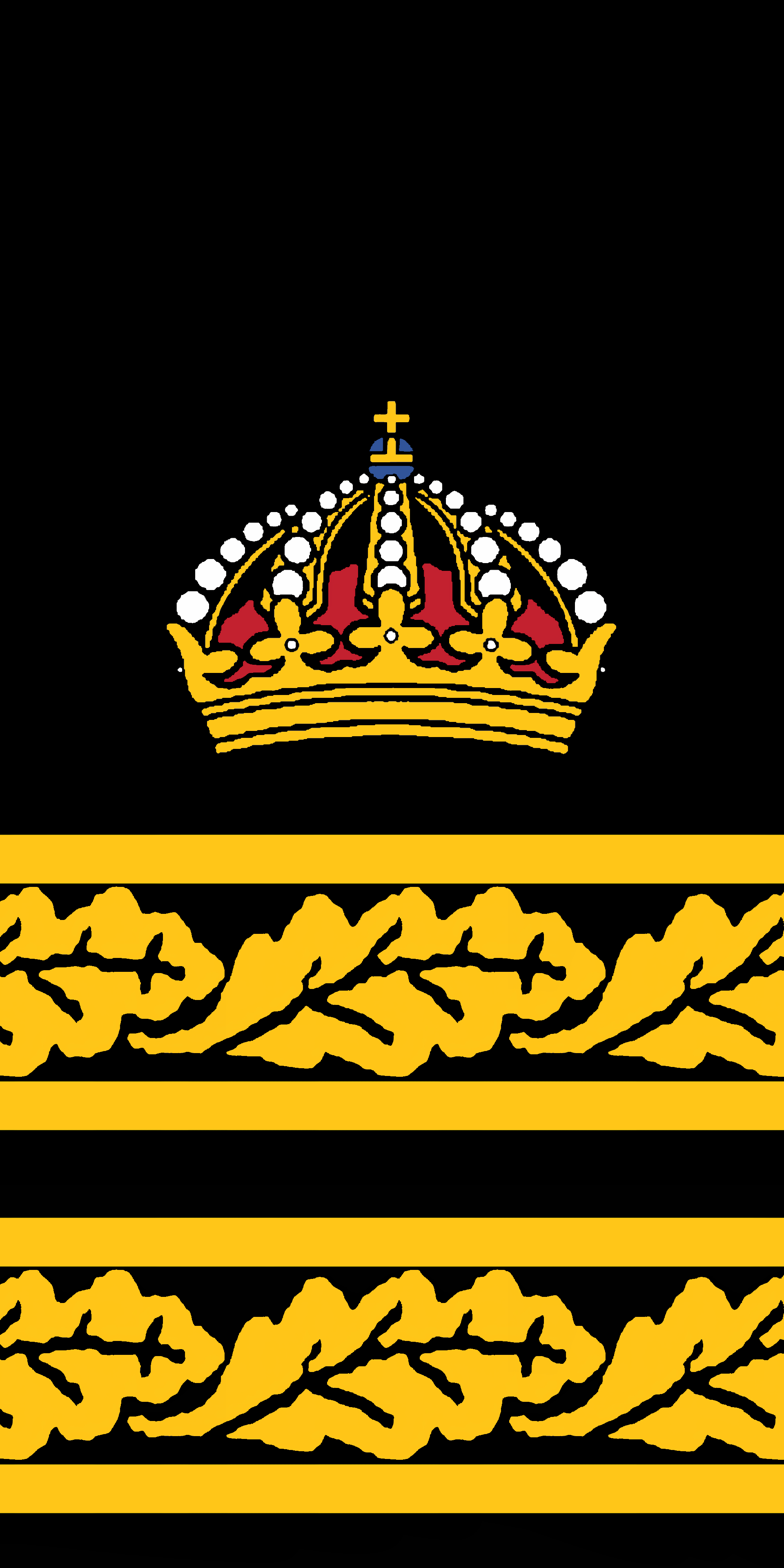
Police Master,
Police Senior Intendant (Chief of unit; Deputy chief of police area) (Polismästare / Polisöverintendent)

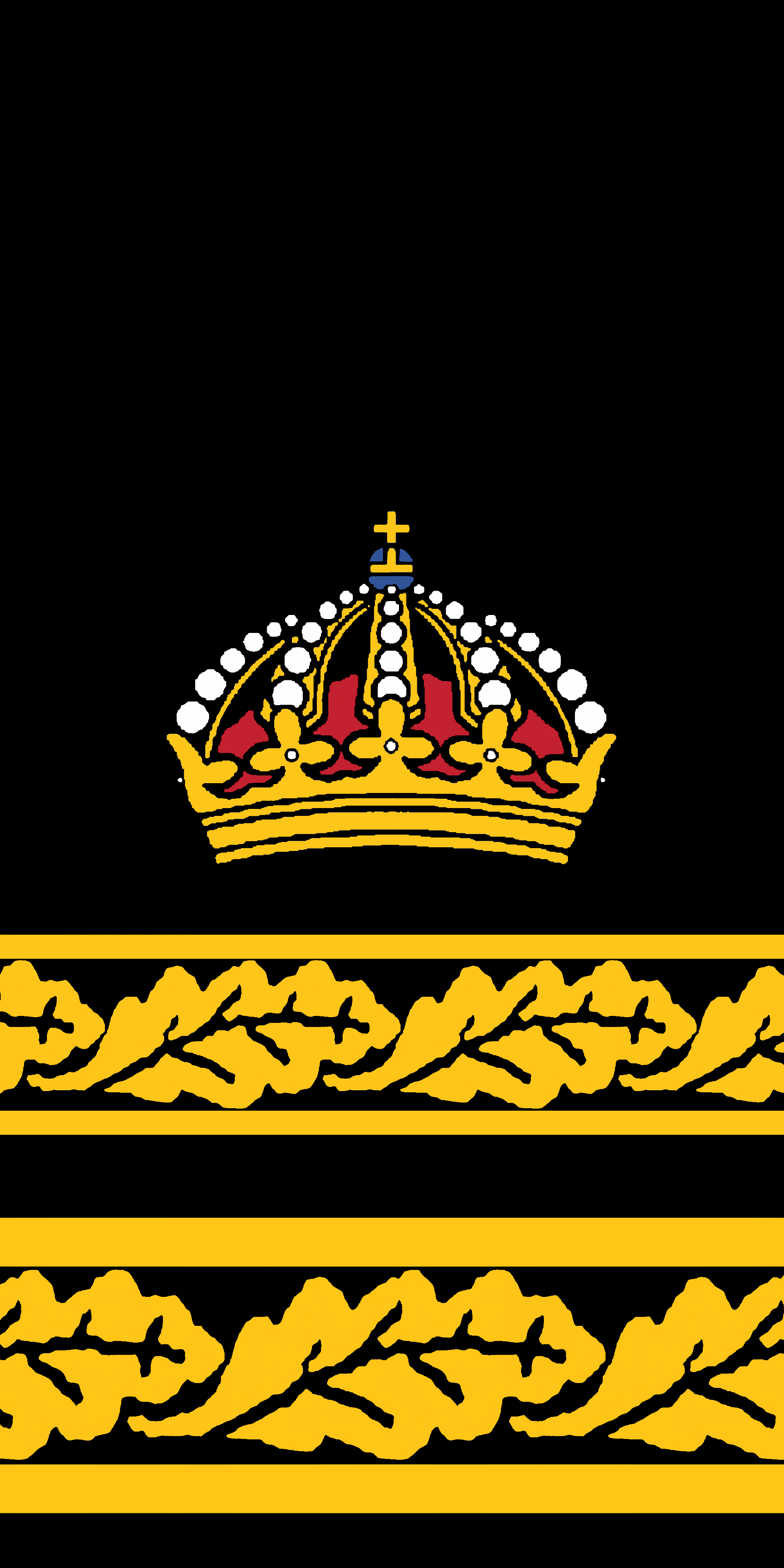
Police Intendant (Chief of a local police area; chief of staff of a police area) (Polisintendent)

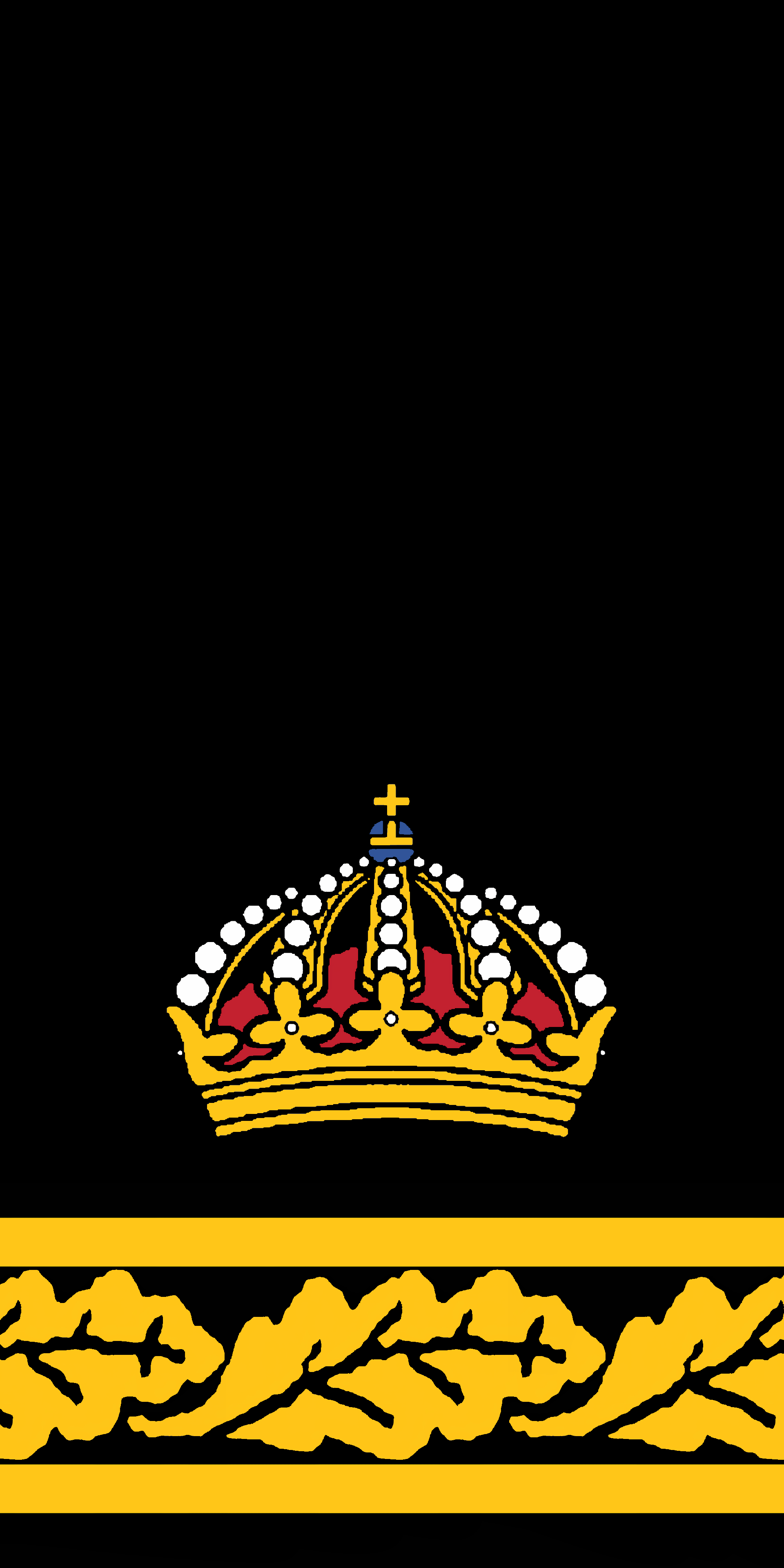
Police Secretary (Section chief of national departments) (Polissekreterare)

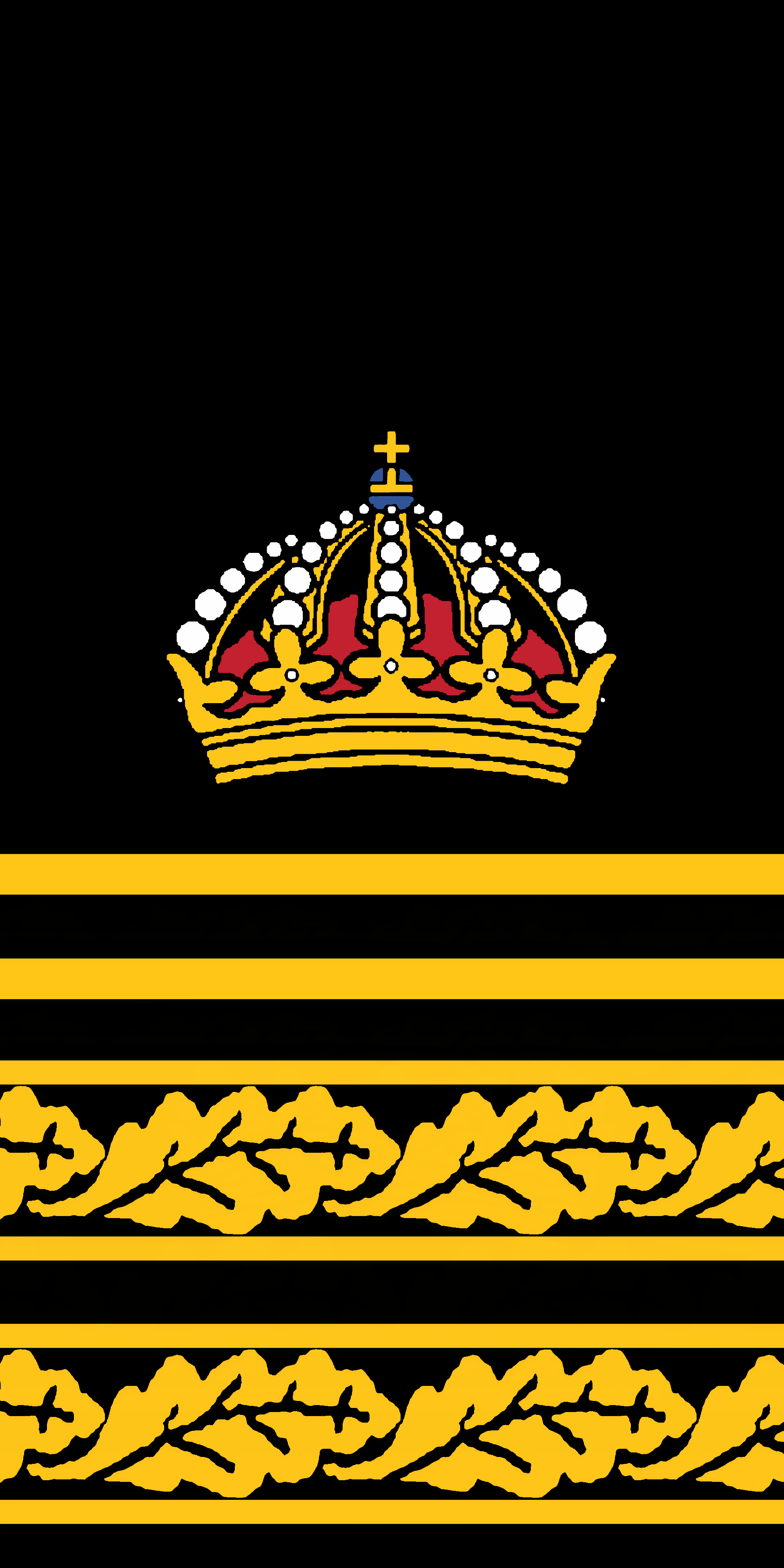
Police Commissar,
Detective Commissar
(Chief of section) (Poliskommissarie / Kriminalkommissarie, chef för sektion)

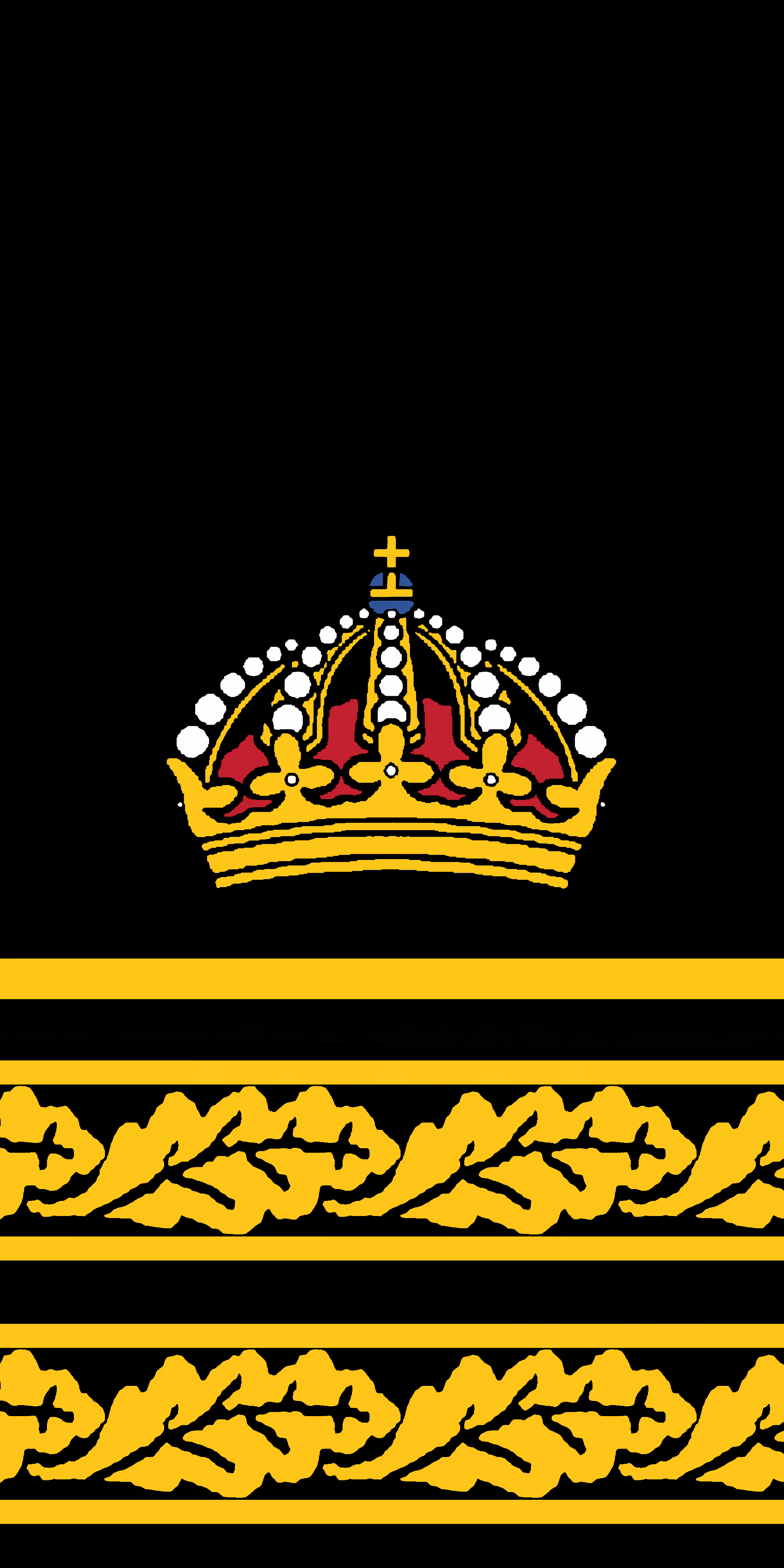
Police Commissar,
Detective Commissar (Regional Supervisor; deputy chief of section/local police area) (Poliskommissarie / Kriminalkommissarie, vakthavande befäl; biträdande chef för lokalpolisområde; chef för befälsgrupp på indirekt nivå)

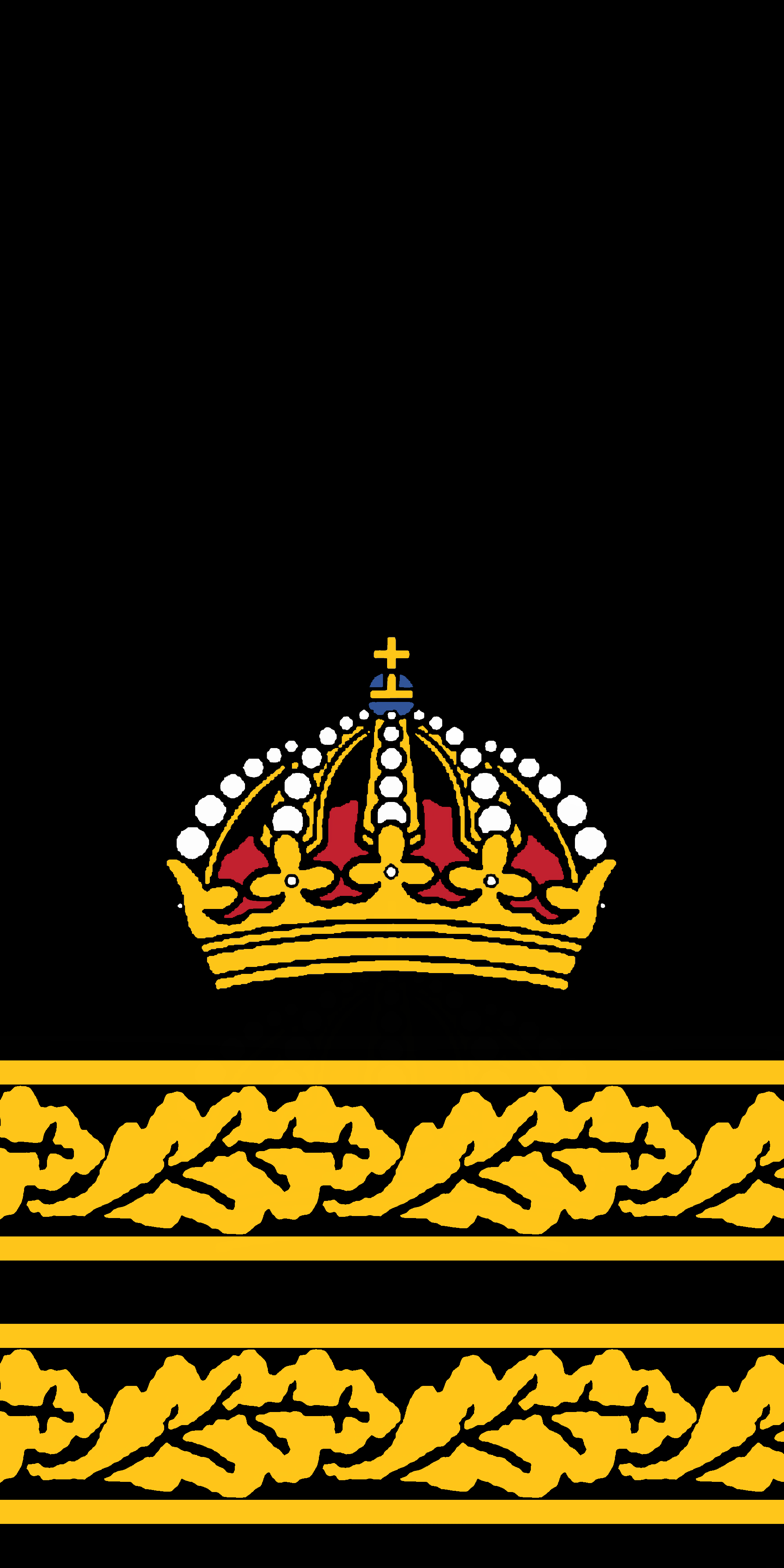
Police Commissar,
Detective Commissar (Poliskommissarie / Kriminalkommissarie)

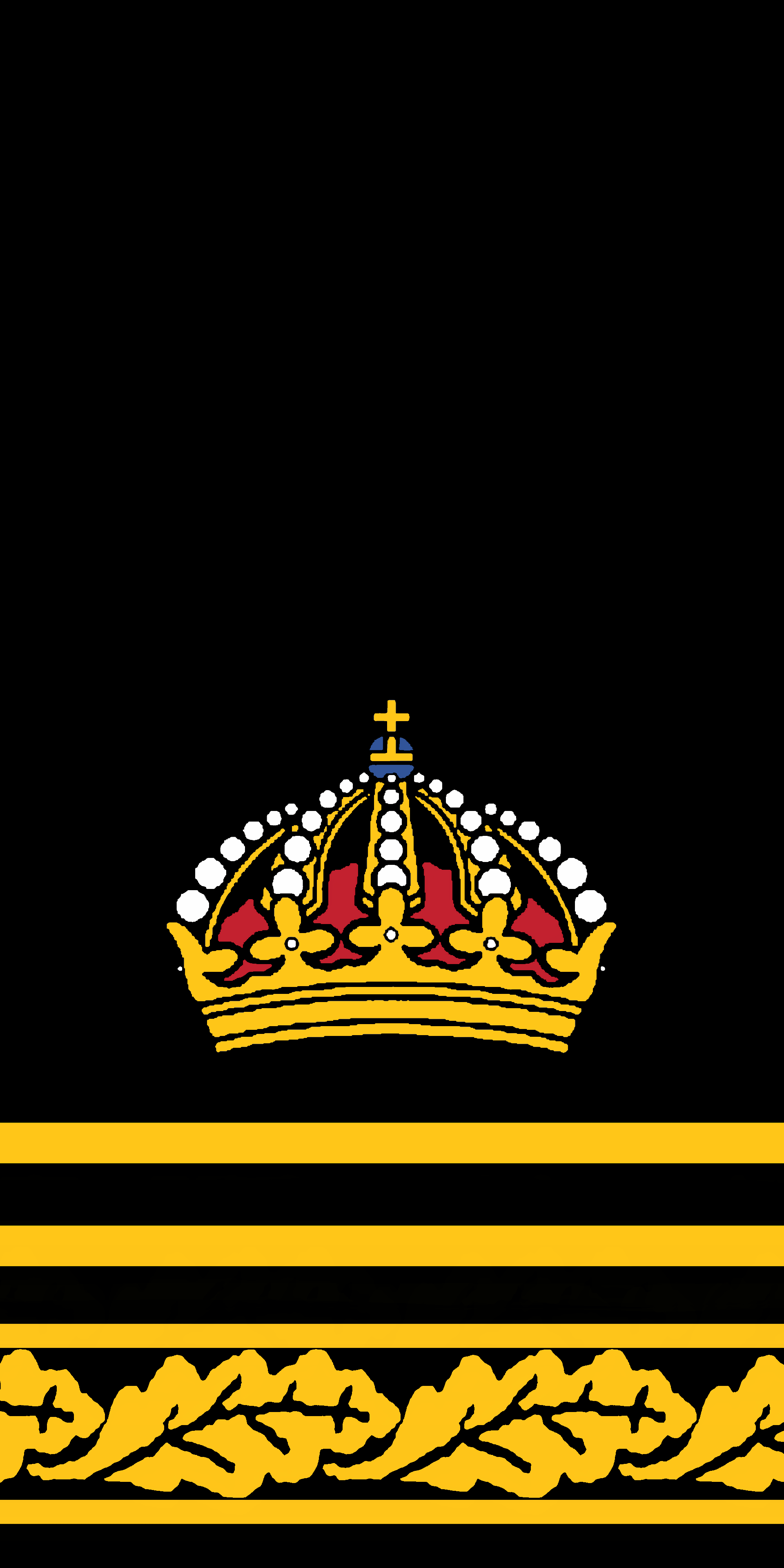
Police Inspector,
Detective Inspector
(Sergeant, chief of group) (Polisinspektör / Kriminalinspektör, chef för grupp)

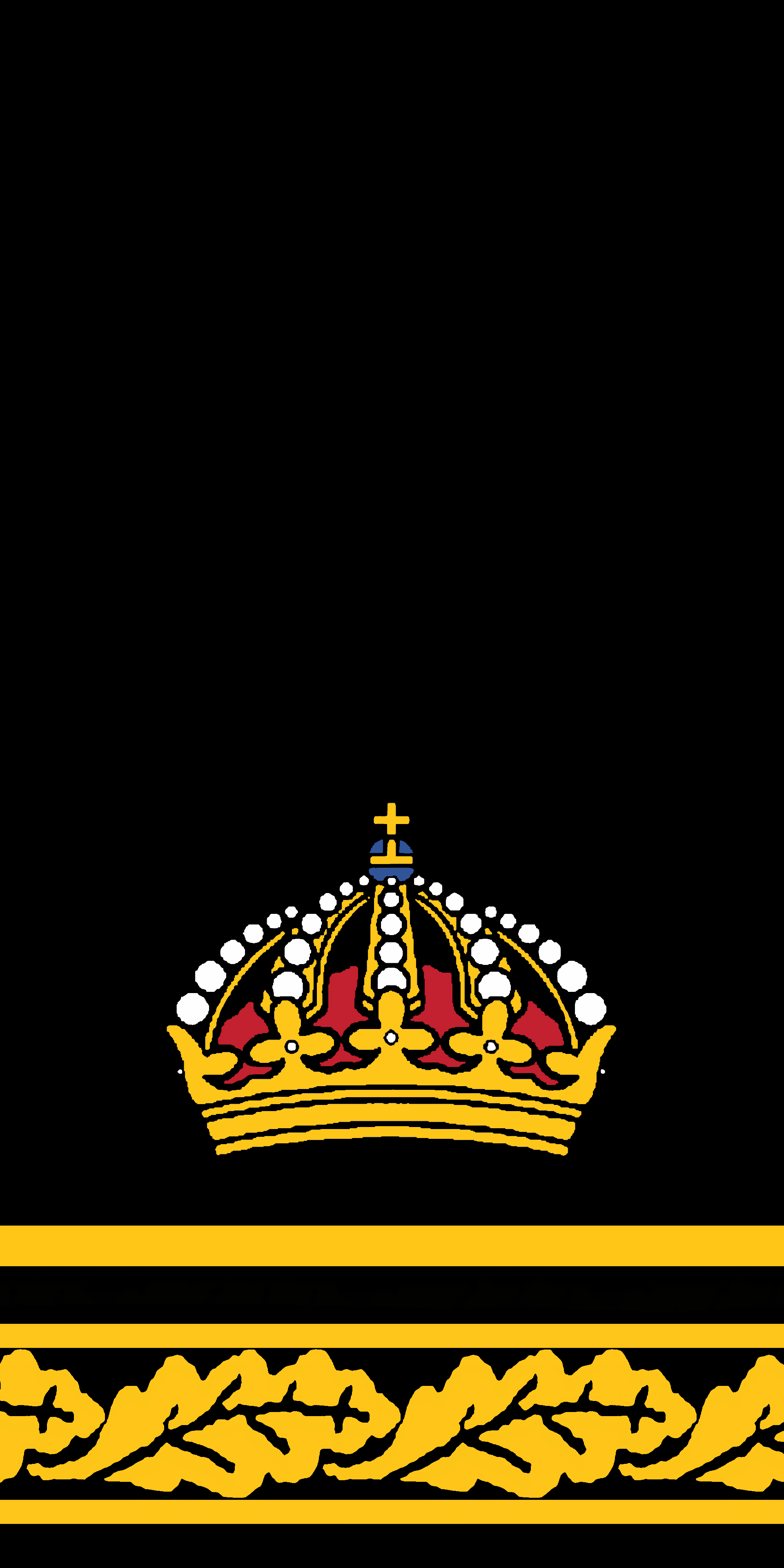
Police Inspector, Detective Inspector (Sergeant, supervisor) (Polisinspektör / Kriminalinspektör, befäl / arbetsledare)

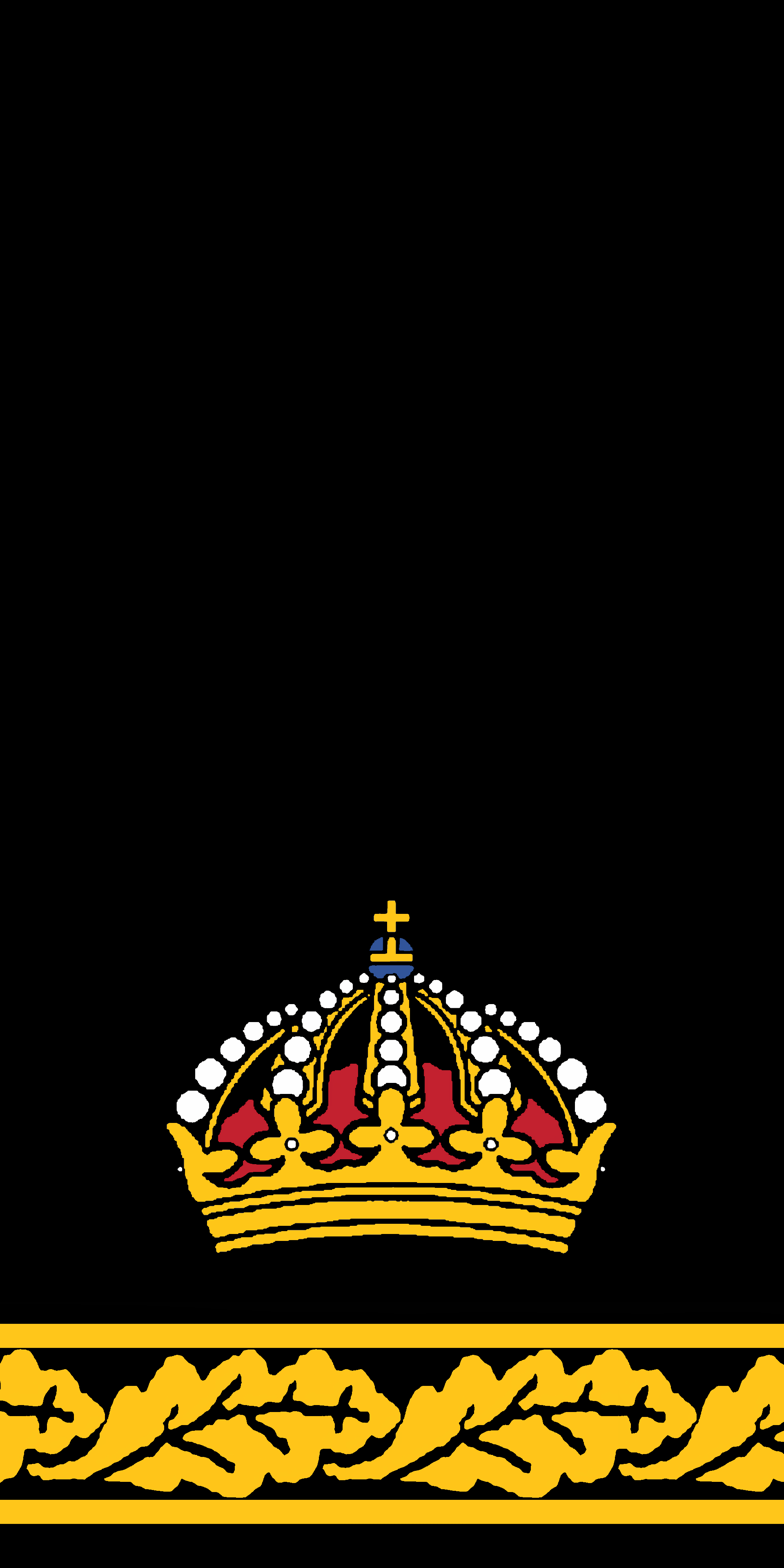
Police Inspector, Detective Inspector (Sergeant) (Polisinspektör / Kriminalinspektör)

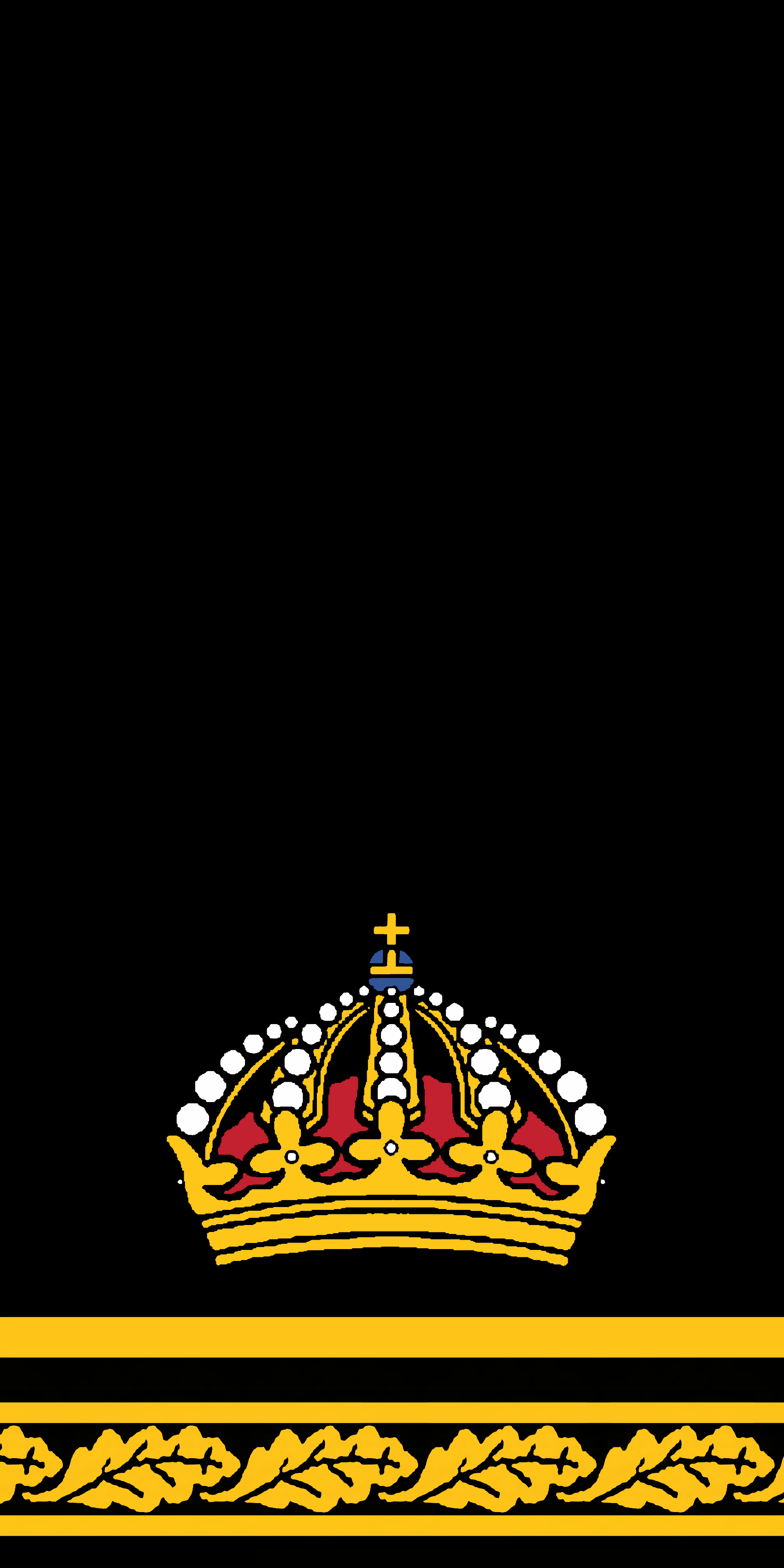
Police Constable (Level 5) (Polisassistent, nivå 5)

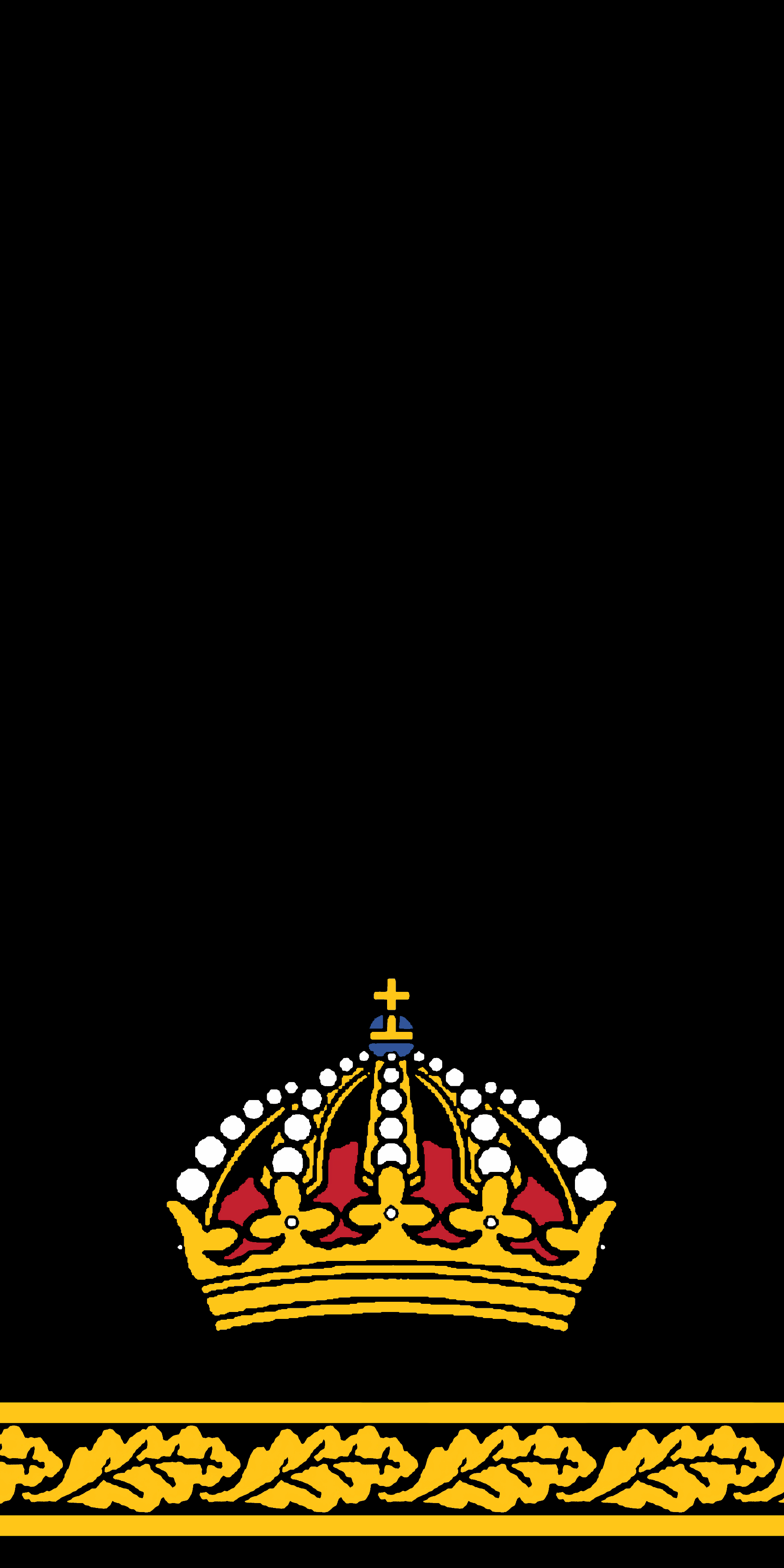
Police Constable (Level 4) (Polisassistent, nivå 4)

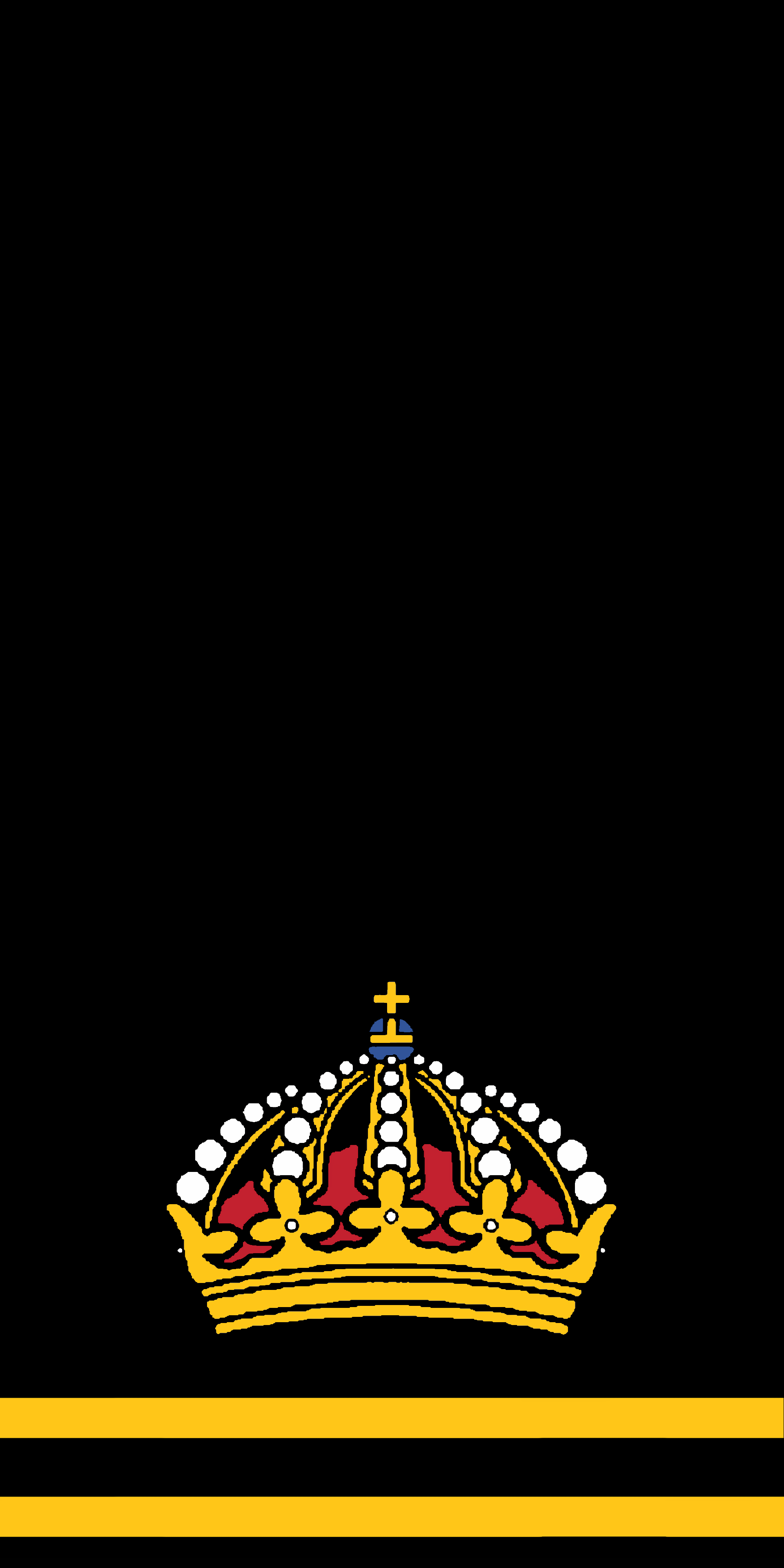
Police Constable (Level 3) (Polisassistent, nivå 3)

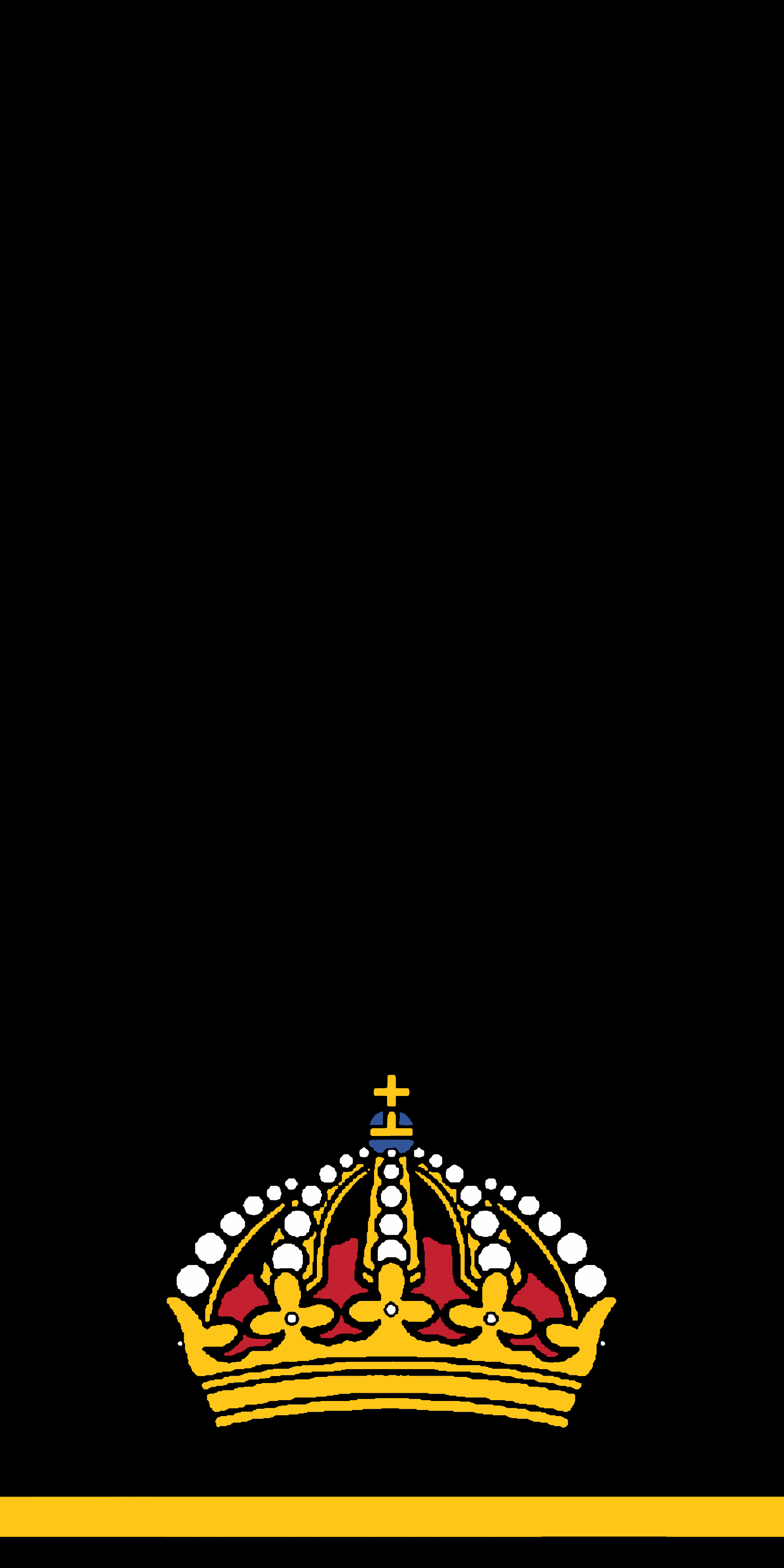
Police Constable (Level 2, or >4 years of service) (Polisassistent, nivå 2 eller >4 års anställning)

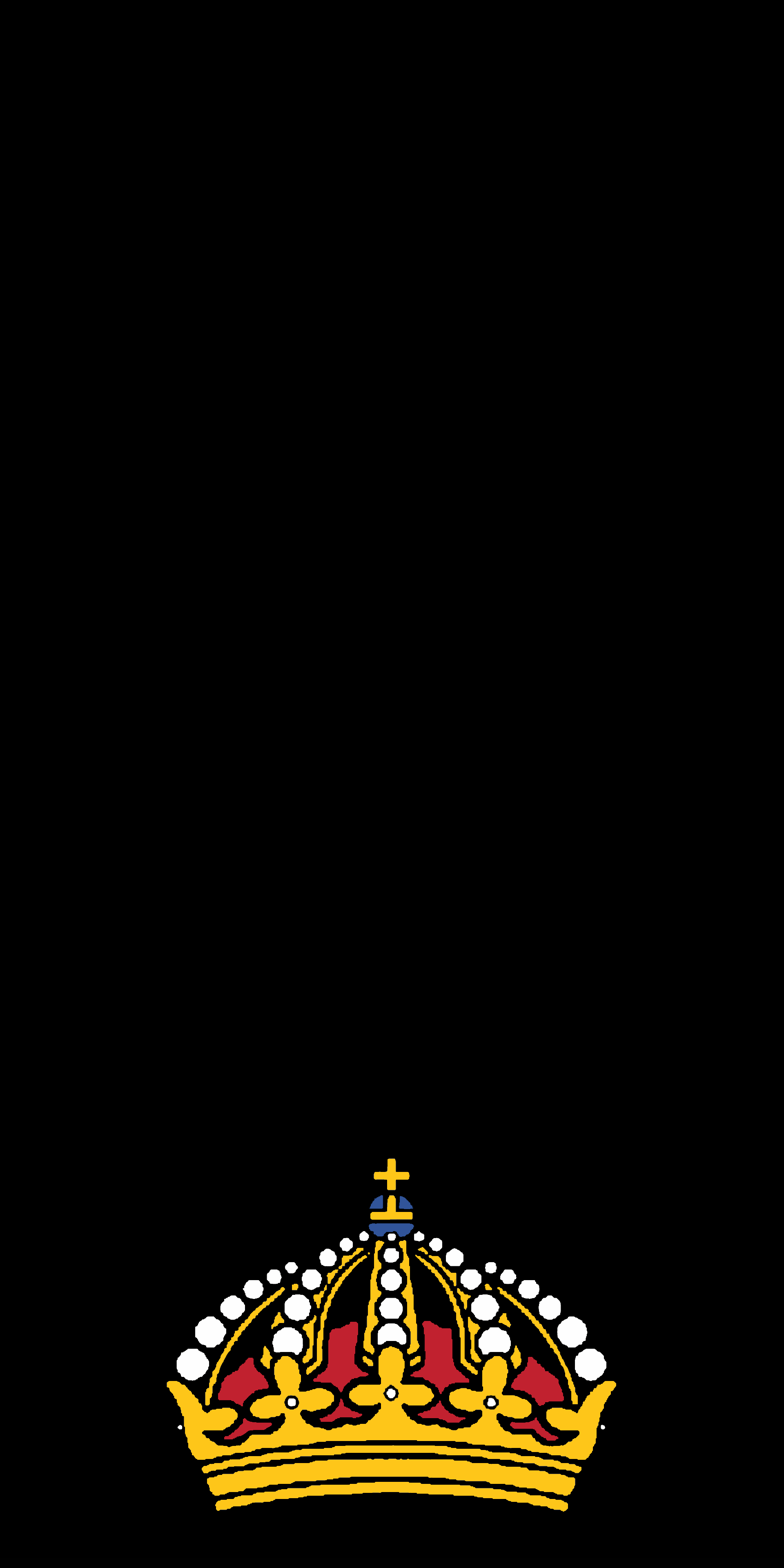
Police Constable (Level 1, or <4 years of service) (Polisassistent, nivå 1 eller <4 års anställning)

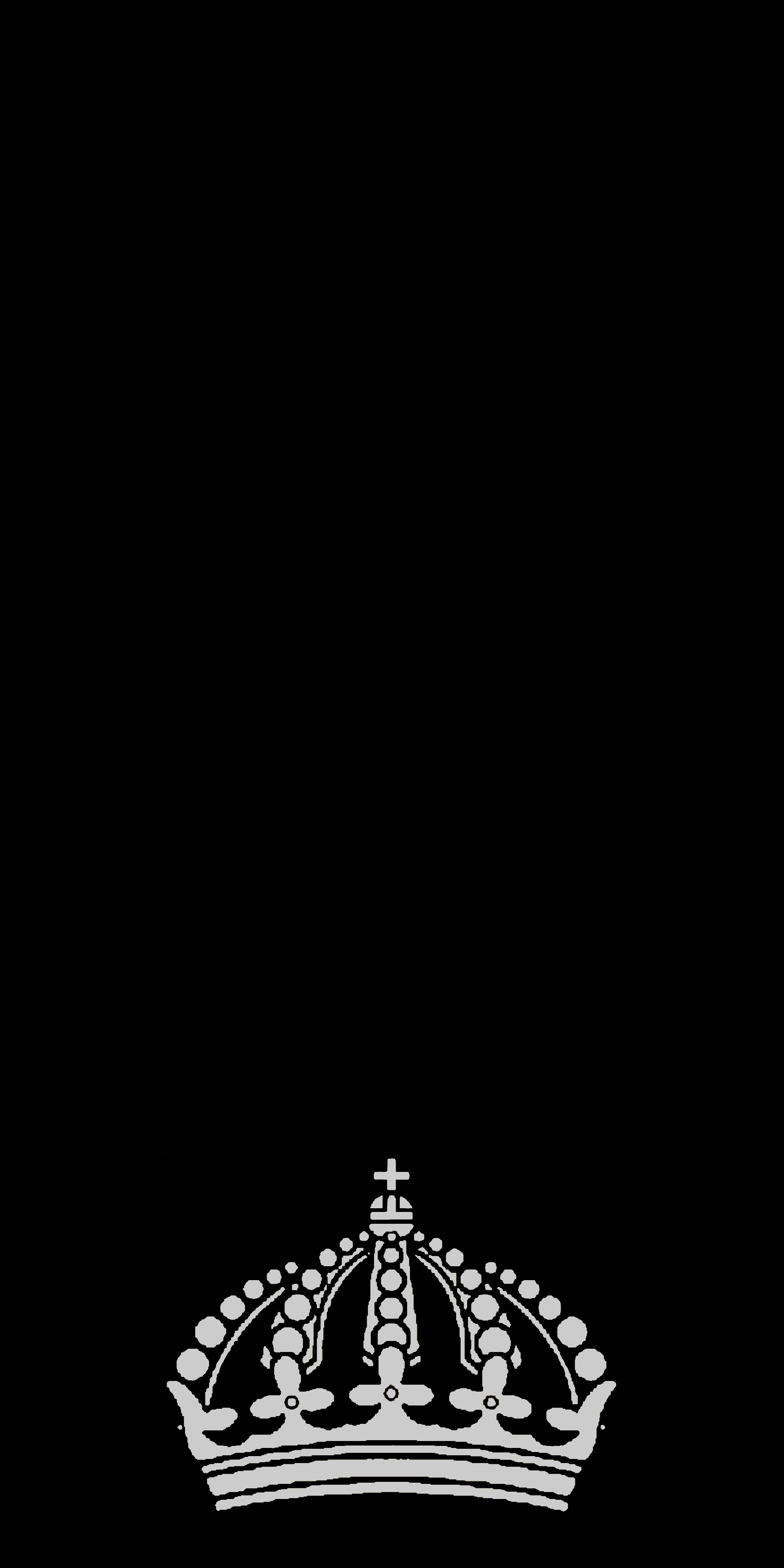
Trainee Police Constable (Officer in field training) (Polisaspirant)

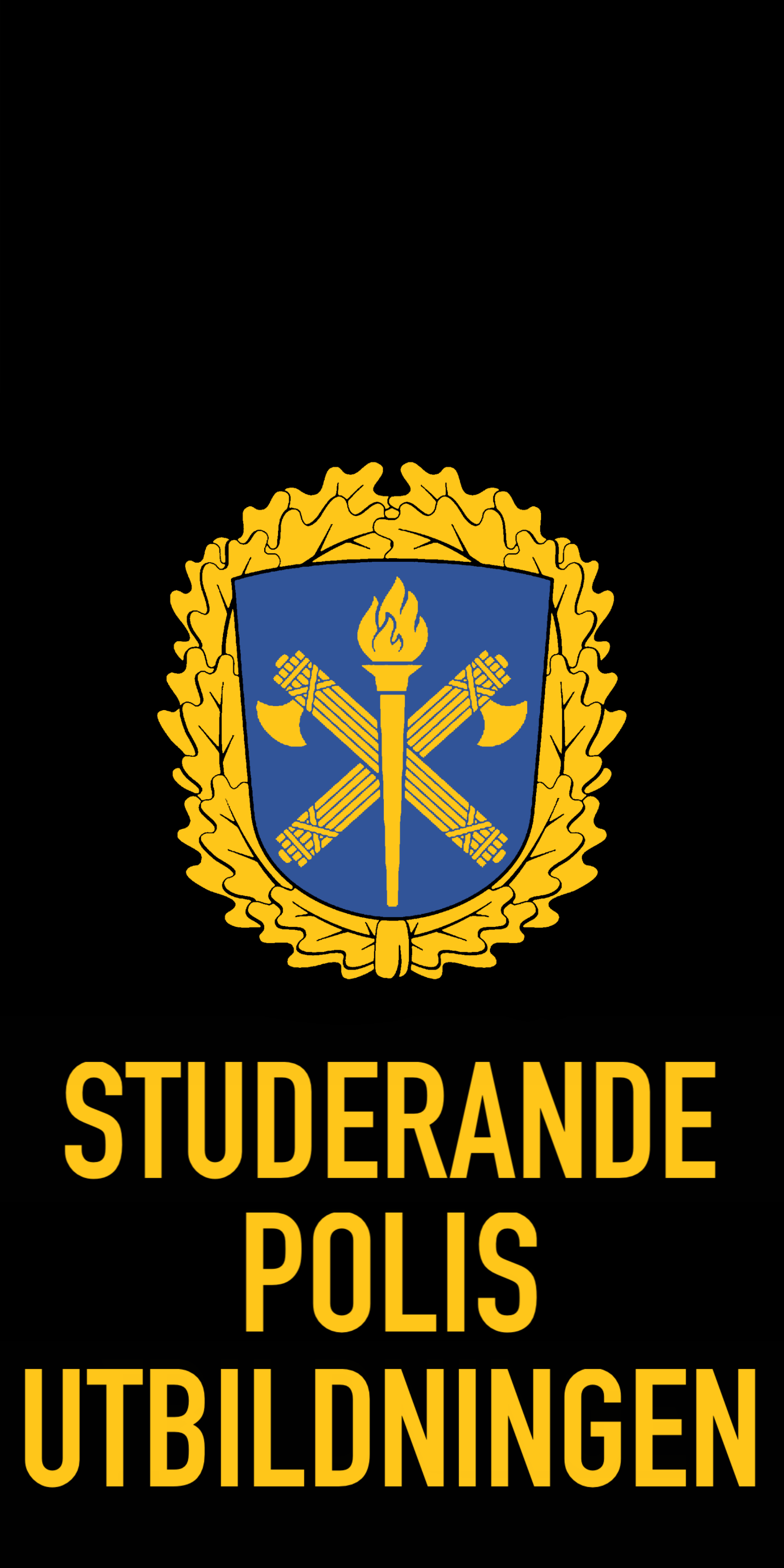
Police Academy Recruit (Studerande Polisutbildningen)

== 2015-2022 ==
Swedish police ranks and insignia since 2015
Rank	Rikspolischef; Säkerhetspolischef	Biträdande säkerhetspolischef	Polisdirektör (Chef för polisregion/avdelning eller efter särskilt beslut av rikspolischefen)	Biträdande polisdirektör (Biträdande för polisregion/avdelning eller efter särskilt beslut av rikspolischefen)	Polismästare (Chef för polisområde eller efter särskilt beslut)	Polismästare/Polisöverintendent (Chef för enhet, biträdande chef för polisområde)	Polisintendent (chef för lokalpolisområde, kanslichef vid polisområde)	Polissekreterare (Note: Appointment as polisintendent or polissekreterare requires an academic degree or graduation from the police academy; graduation from the police senior leadership course, and at least three years experience of indirect leadership. (Rikspolisstyrelsens författningssamling 2011:20.))
Translation	National Police Chief; Chief of the Security Police	Deputy Chief of the Security Police	Police Director (Regional Police Chief, Department Chief, or after special appointment)	Assistant Police Director (Deputy regional Police Chief, Deputy department Chief, or after special appointment)	Police Master (Chief of police area, or after special appointment)	Police Master; Police Senior Intendant (Chief of unit, Deputy chief of police area)	Police Intendant (Chief of a local police area, chief of staff of a police area)	Police Secretary
Commonwealth equivalent	Inspector-General	Deputy Inspector-General	Commissioner	Deputy Commissioner	Assistant Commissioner	Chief Superintendent	Senior Superintendent	Superintendent
Insignia
Rank	Poliskommisarie; Kriminalkommissarie, (Chef för sektion)	Poliskommisarie; Kriminalkommissarie (Befäl/arbetsledare, biträdande chef för section/lokalpolisområde, chef för befälsgrupp på indirect nivå)	Poliskommisarie; Kriminalkommissarie	Polisinspektör; Kriminalinspektör (Chef för grupp)	Polisinspektör; Kriminalinspektör (Befäl/arbetsledare	Polisinspektör; Kriminalinspektör	Polisassistent (4 års anställning)	Polisassistent	Polisaspirant
Translation	Police Commissar; Detective Commissar (Chief of section)	Police Commissar; Detective Commissar (Supervisor, deputy chief of section/local police area)	Police Commissar; Detective Commissar	Police Inspector; Detective Inspector (Chief of group)	Police Inspector; Detective Inspector (Supervisor)	Police Inspector; Detective Inspector	Police Assistant (4 years' service)	Police Assistant	Police Aspirant
Commonwealth equivalent	Deputy Superintendent	Assistant Superintendent	Chief Inspector	Inspector	Sergeant Major	Sergeant	Senior Constable	Constable	Student Constable
Insignia

== Prior to 2015 ==
Swedish police ranks and insignia prior to 2015^{1}
Order	Insignia	Rank	Swedish
1.		National Police Commissioner	Rikspolischef
2.		Deputy Director-General; Head of the National Police Board; Head of the National Bureau of Investigation; Chief Commissioner of Stockholm, Västra Götaland and Skåne County Police Departments	Överdirektör; Chefen för polisavdelningen vid Rikspolisstyrelsen; Rikskriminalchef; Länspolismästare i Stockholms län, Västra Götaland och Skåne
3.		Chief Commissioners outside of Stockholm, Västra Götaland and Skåne County Police Departments; Deputy Chief Commissioners, Stockholm, Västra Götaland and Skåne County Police Departments	Länspolismästare i alla län utom Stockholm, Västra Götaland och Skåne; Biträdande länspolismästare i Stockholms län, Västra Götaland och Skåne
4.		Deputy Chief Commissioners outside of Stockholm, Västra Götaland and Skåne County Police Departments; District Police Commissioner; Deputy Police Commissioner; Director at the National Police Academy; Head of Division at the National Police Board	Biträdande länspolismästare utom i Stockholms län, Västra Götaland och Skåne; Polismästare; Polisöverintendent; Rektor på Polishögskolan; Enhetschef Rikspolisstyrelsen
5.		Chief Superintendent; Chief of police in a city larger than 35,000 people — for example, Uppsala or Norrköping — or in charge of a department in one of the metropolitan areas.	Polisintendent
6.		Assistant Police Commissioner; In charge of departments in a county or city, of a police district in the three largest cities and in larger counties.	Polissekreterare
7.		Superintendent; Detective Superintendent; In charge of a police district within a county or city police force, leads a riot police battalion, the riot police unit or helicopter unit for the county police. Usually commands around 300 policemen. Police chief for towns between 10,000 and 22,000 inhabitants.	Poliskommisarie, Kriminalkommissarie med särskild tjänsteställning
8.		Chief Inspector, Detective Chief Inspector; In charge of a police station in the three largest cities, or a police chief of towns less than 10,000 people. Chief of Company for the riot police and armed units. Usually commands around 120-150 personnel.	Poliskommissarie; Kriminalkommissarie
9.		Inspector; Detective Inspector; In charge of a police station or precinct, a riot police unit of 40-45 officers or a police helicopter squadron.	Polisinspektör, Kriminalinspektör med särskild tjänsteställning
10.		Sergeant; Detective Sergeant; Lowest officer rank at precinct level that can make arrests, issue fines, and personally open and lead an investigation. Usually supervises 20-25 policemen or in case of riot police, a squad of 15 riot police officers.	Polisinspektör; Kriminalinspektör
11.		Senior Police Constable, 4 years of employment; Squad leaders, cannot make an arrest or lead/open an investigation unless specifically authorized by a sergeant. However, may issue certain fines. Usually leads squad of 5-6 constables.	Polisassistent, 4 års anställning
12.		Police Constable; Between 0 and 4 years of service. Patrolling, emergency responses, assistance, etc.	Polisassistent
13.		Police Trainee	Polisaspirant
