= Hallgren =

Hallgren is a surname. Notable people with the surname include:

- Åke Hallgren (1918–2005), Swedish Olympic athlete
- Eric Hallgren (1880–1956), Swedish police and civil servant
- Frida Hallgren (born 1974), Swedish actress
- Gary Hallgren (born 1945), American illustrator and underground cartoonist
- Johan Hallgren (born 1975), Swedish musician
- Konrad Hallgren (1891–1962), Swedish fascist
- Mauritz A. Hallgren (1899–1956), American journalist, editor, and author
- Sam Hallgren (a.k.a. Sam Van Hallgren), former host of the podcast Filmspotting

== See also ==
- Mount Hallgren, mountain 27 miles southwest of Neumayer Cliffs in the Kirwan Escarpment, Queen Maud Land
