= Ernst Leche =

Swedish jurist and judge (1897–1978)

Ernst Henrik Leche (23 July 1897 – 3 April 1978) was a Swedish jurist and a district judge. He is credited with the establishment of the General Security Service (Allmänna säkerhetstjänsten), the predecessor of the Swedish Security Service.

== Early life ==
Leche was born on 23 July 1897 in Karlskrona, the son of Commander Carl Leche and his wife Elisabeth (née Swanlund) and brother of Colonel Hakon Leche. He passed studentexamen in 1915 and became a reserve officer in 1917 and received a Candidate of Law degree in Stockholm in 1920.

== Career ==
Leche was acting legal clerk (fiskal) in the Svea Court of Appeal in 1925, co-opted member (adjungerad ledamot) of it in 1926 and assessor in 1929. He was a co-opted member of the Water Court of Appeals (Vattenöverdomstolen) in 1929, an assistance at the Ministry of Justice in 1932 and acting judge referee in 1933. Leche was director of law cases at the Ministry of Justice from 1935 to 1939 and hovrättsråd at the Court of Appeal for Northern Norrland in 1936. He was district judge (häradshövding) at Nedansiljan Judicial District from 1939 to 1964 and held law ordinances in different judicial districts and hovrätt's from 1964 to 1975.

He was a member of various committees for the investigation of the public prosecutors reorganization from 1934 to 1935 and from 1937 to 1938 and in the 1936 Judicial District Committee. Leche was an expert in the Defence Staff for the organization and training of the field police in 1941 and for the establishment of the General Security Service (Allmänna säkerhetstjänsten, the predecessor of the Swedish Security Service) from 1936 to 1937. At the time, Leche did staff service refresher training under Carlos Adlercreutz. Leche push through the decision to establish the General Security Service with the help of Torsten Nothin and Olof Thörnell.

Leche became a captain in the Norrbotten Artillery Corps' (A 5) reserve in 1940. He was expert for law-making of the courthouse construction obligation (tingshusbyggnadsskyldigheten) and was chairman of the committee for the reorganization of the fortification police in Boden in 1941. Leche was chairman of the committee for the investigation of the police officer's right to use force in 1942 and member of Procedural Board (Processnämnden) from 1946 to 1948. He was legal counsel of the Chief of the Army from 1938 to 1939, and member of the Kopparberg County Temperance Board (Länsnykterhetsnämnden) from 1940 to 1973. Leche was chairman of the Nya System AB's advisory board in Kopparberg County from 1963 and chairman of the monitoring board in Leksand from 1965 to 1969.

== Personal life ==
In 1929, he married Lily Keyser Jordan (1902–1953), daughter of Norwegian Supreme Court lawyer Keyser Jordan and Marianne (née Hjort). Leche was the father of Johan (born 1933).

== Death ==
He died on 3 April 1978 and was buried at Rättvik cemetery.

== Awards and decorations ==
- Commander of the Order of the Polar Star
- Knight of the Order of Vasa
- Commander of the Order of the Three Stars
- Illis Quorum, 8th size (1968)
