= KGB Museum =

KGB Museum may refer to one of the following

- Museum of the KGB, Moscow, Russia
- Vilnius KGB Museum, Lithuania
- A museum on the 23rd floor of the Sokos Hotel Viru, Tallinn

== See also ==
- KGB Espionage Museum, New York City
