= Spy Museum (Tampere) =

Museum in Tampere, Finland

Coordinates: 61°30′04″N 23°45′39″E

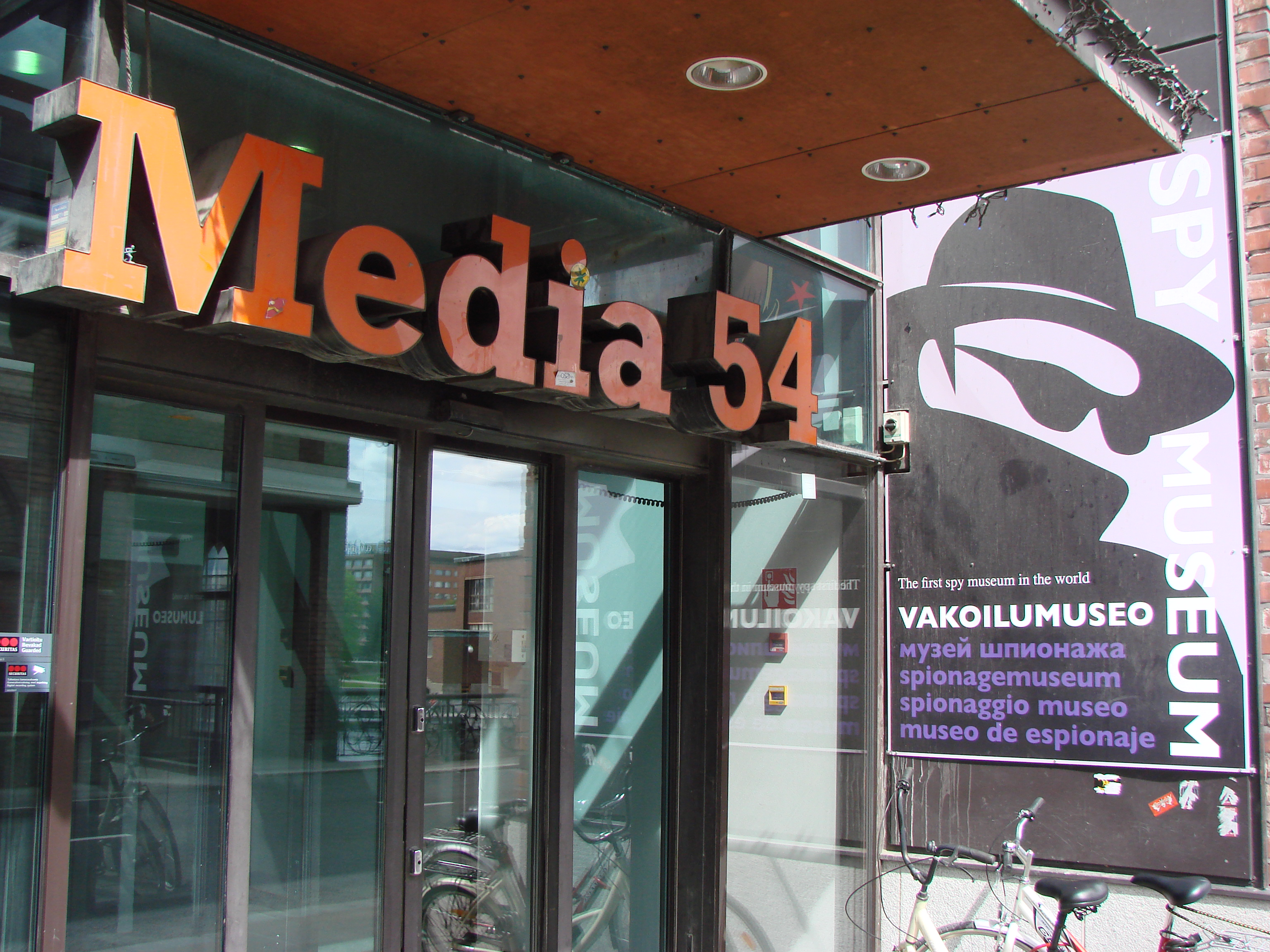
The Spy Museum

The Spy Museum is the world's first public museum of international espionage, located in Tampere, Finland. The museum was founded in 1998 by Teppo Turja.

== Museum ==
The museum is located in the centre of Tampere in the old Finlayson factory building, which has been converted into a cultural centre. The museum is visited by over 20 thousand people every year. Approximately half of the visitors are from outside Finland, particularly from Russia, the United States, Germany, France, Japan and the United Kingdom.

Espionage has a significant role in history. Even today, espionage affects all aspects of society life. In espionage, even individual people have had a greater effect on the history of the world than official governments or heads of state. Because of this, the founding of a spy museum was thought necessary.

The museum is privately owned. The basic installation, which covers espionage from a neutral point of view, concentrates on inspecting espionage through individual spies and the methods and tools they used. Many sorts of material is presented, for example nuclear power espionage from the time of the Cold War.

One of the museum's educational goals is to make children and youths interested in museums in general. Naturally, the conservation of unusual and unique objects for future generations is one of the basic functions of the museum. The image of espionage portrayed by the media and the entertainment industry is largely glamorous and fictitious. The museum intends to correct this, even though it also includes entertainment elements.

The museum presents some of the world's famous spies, such as Kim Philby, Ethel and Julius Rosenberg, Richard Sorge, Mata Hari, Oleg Gordievsky and Sidney Reilly, accompanied by a thorough description of their lives. Among the dozens of personal characters are the founder of the scouts movement Robert Baden-Powell and Finland's Marshall Carl Gustaf Mannerheim.

The museum organises pre-registered guided tours mostly in Finnish and in English. The guide book of the museum has been translated to German, Russian, Japanese, Polish, French, Spanish, Italian and Swedish. The museum also offers a non-serious "agent test". Participants of the test receive a recommendation letter to an espionage agency best fitting their skills as a souvenir. The agency in question could be MI6, GRU, Mossad, CIA, Säpo or Supo. The museum shop also offers espionage-related souvenirs.

== Material in the museum ==
The museum presents eavesdropping devices, covert microphones, miniature cameras, a lie detector, cryptography devices, radio devices, forgeries, maps, concealed weapons and optic devices. Visitors can also try out espionage devices for themselves. Among the devices they can use are invisible ink, an infrared vision device, a voice changer and a safe awaiting for its code to be cracked. The museum also has a secret room, and the bravest of the visitors dare to enter the pitch-dark espionage tunnel.
