= Säpojoggen =

Annual jogging event in Sweden

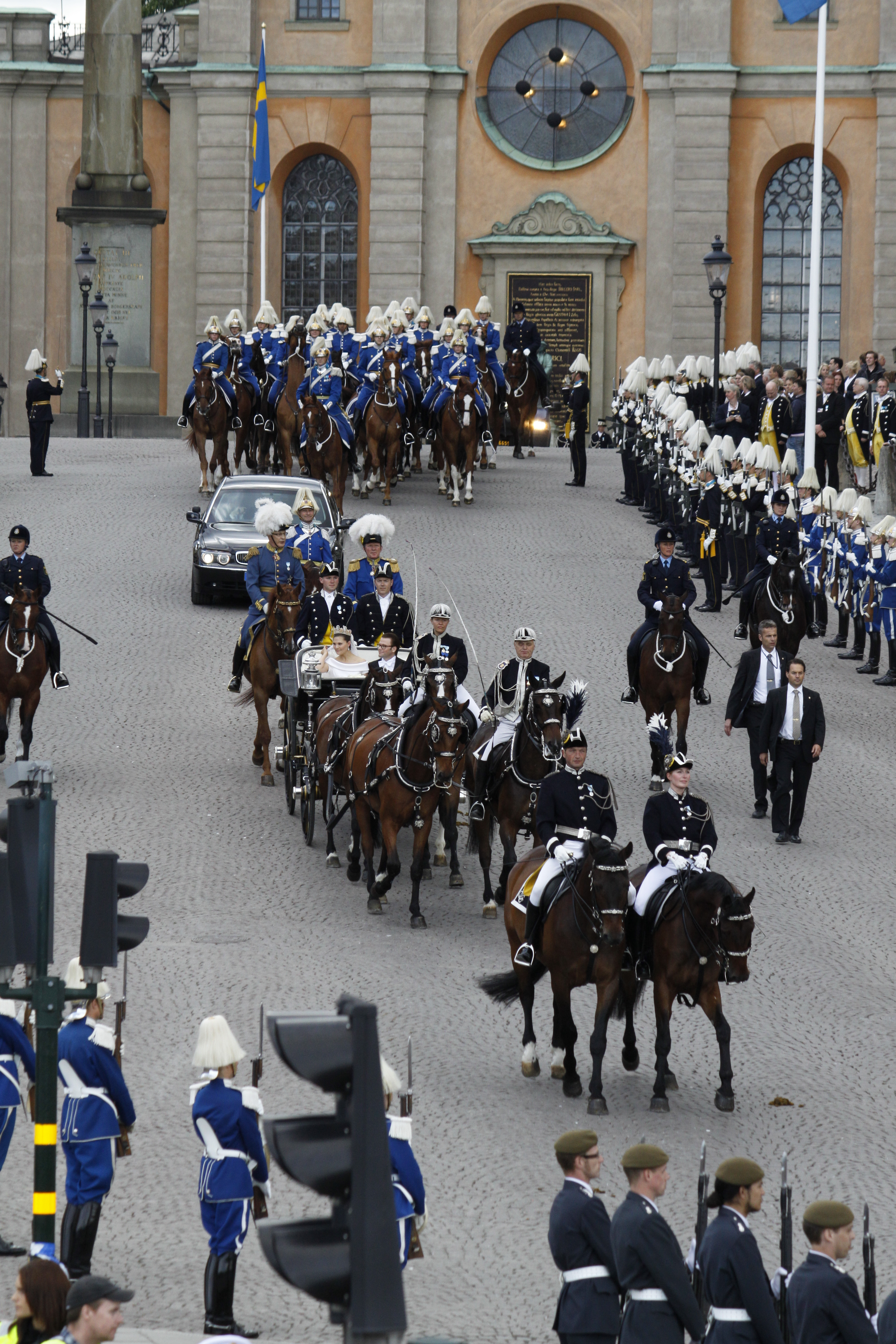
The 2010 wedding procession at Slottsbacken. Two of the Säpo bodyguards can be seen to the right.

Säpojoggen refers to two annual jogging events in Sweden. One of them is arranged in Stockholm and the other one at the Almedalen park in Visby.

The inspiration came from the 2010 wedding of Victoria, Crown Princess of Sweden, and Daniel Westling, where four bodyguards from Swedish Security Service (Säpo), dressed in suits, could be seen jogging next to the procession with the couple.

== Stockholm event ==
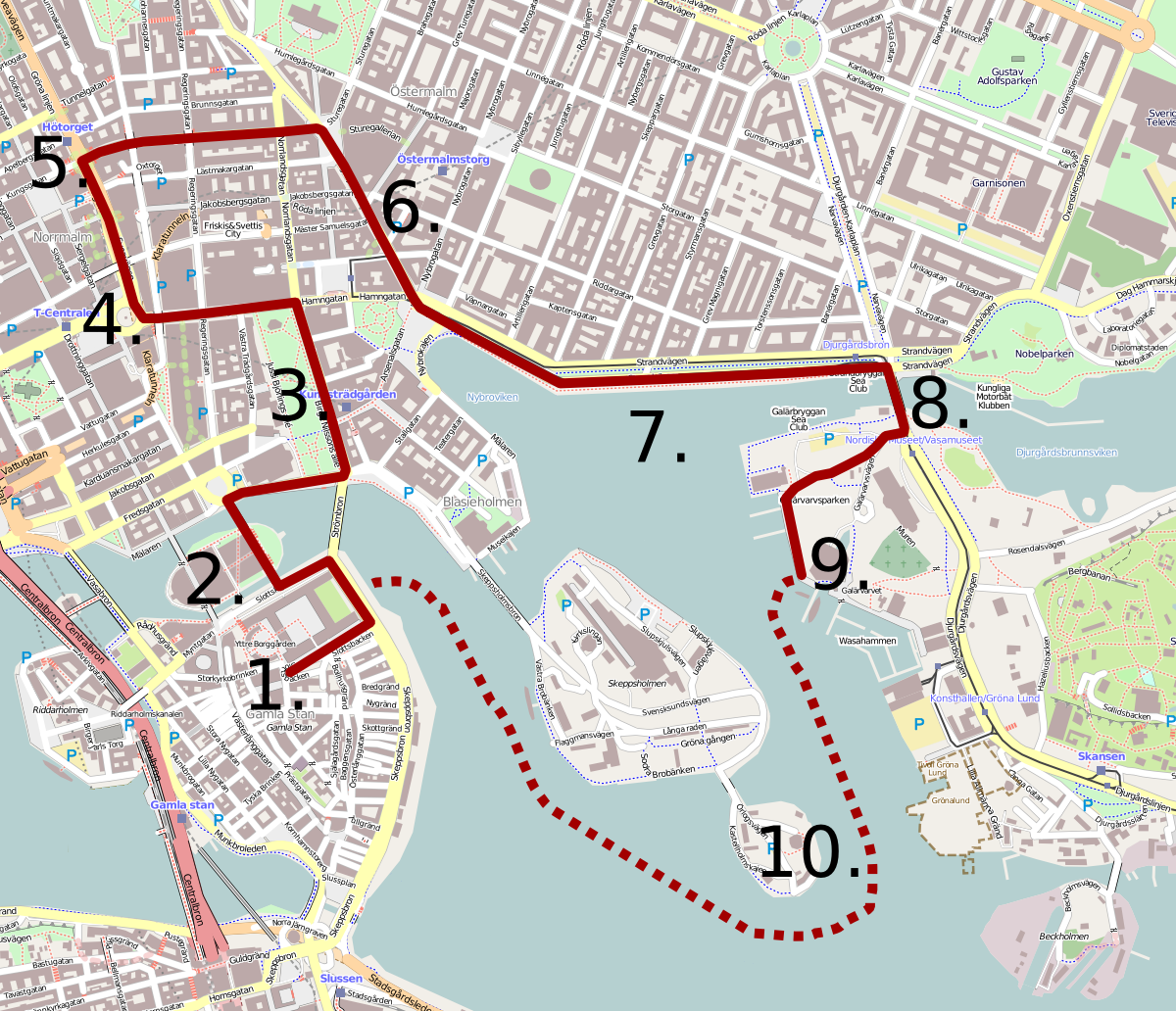
The route for the Säpojoggen event in Stockholm

The Stockholm event takes place on 19 June, the anniversary of the wedding. Participants are encouraged to wear dark unbuttoned suits and white shirts in the same style as the bodyguards had during the 2010 wedding procession. Female participants are exempt from wearing a tie (the female bodyguard did not wear one during the royal wedding). The run starts at 16.40, and follows the route Storkyrkan—Slottsbacken—Kungsträdgårdsgatan—Hamngatan—Kungsgatan—Strandvägen—Djurgården. The total length of the track is 4.65 kilometres (2.89 mi). It is not a competitive event; the runners are supposed to keep together in a formation throughout the track and the goal is to keep the same pace and time as the actual bodyguards.

About one hundred participants attended the first event. Some of them wore earphones, sunglasses and water guns. At the second event in 2012, the number of participants was reported to be around 40.

== Almedalen event ==
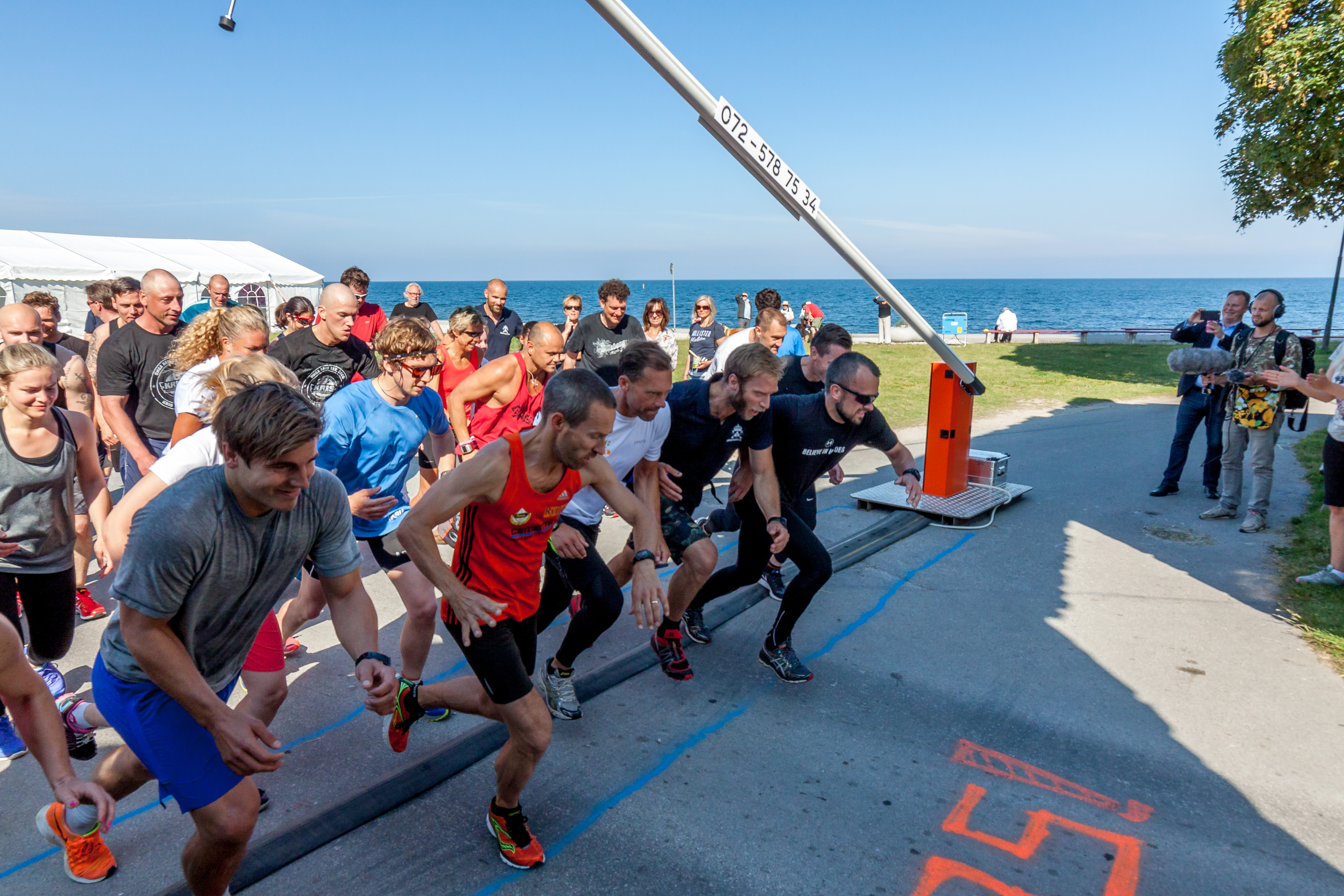
Säpojoggen start in Almedalen 2015

The event in Almedalen is arranged by actual Säpo personnel as a PR event in conjunction with the political activities during the Almedalen Week. It takes place in the morning, and is open for the public to join. It also differs from the Stockholm event in that it is arranged as a competition, and that there is no dress code; regular training clothes are worn by the attendees. After finishing, members of public are invited to chat and ask questions about the tasks and purposes of Säpo, and how the bodyguards prepare themselves for their missions. The track length is about 1.5 kilometres (0.93 mi).
