= Carlos Adlercreutz =

Swedish Army officer

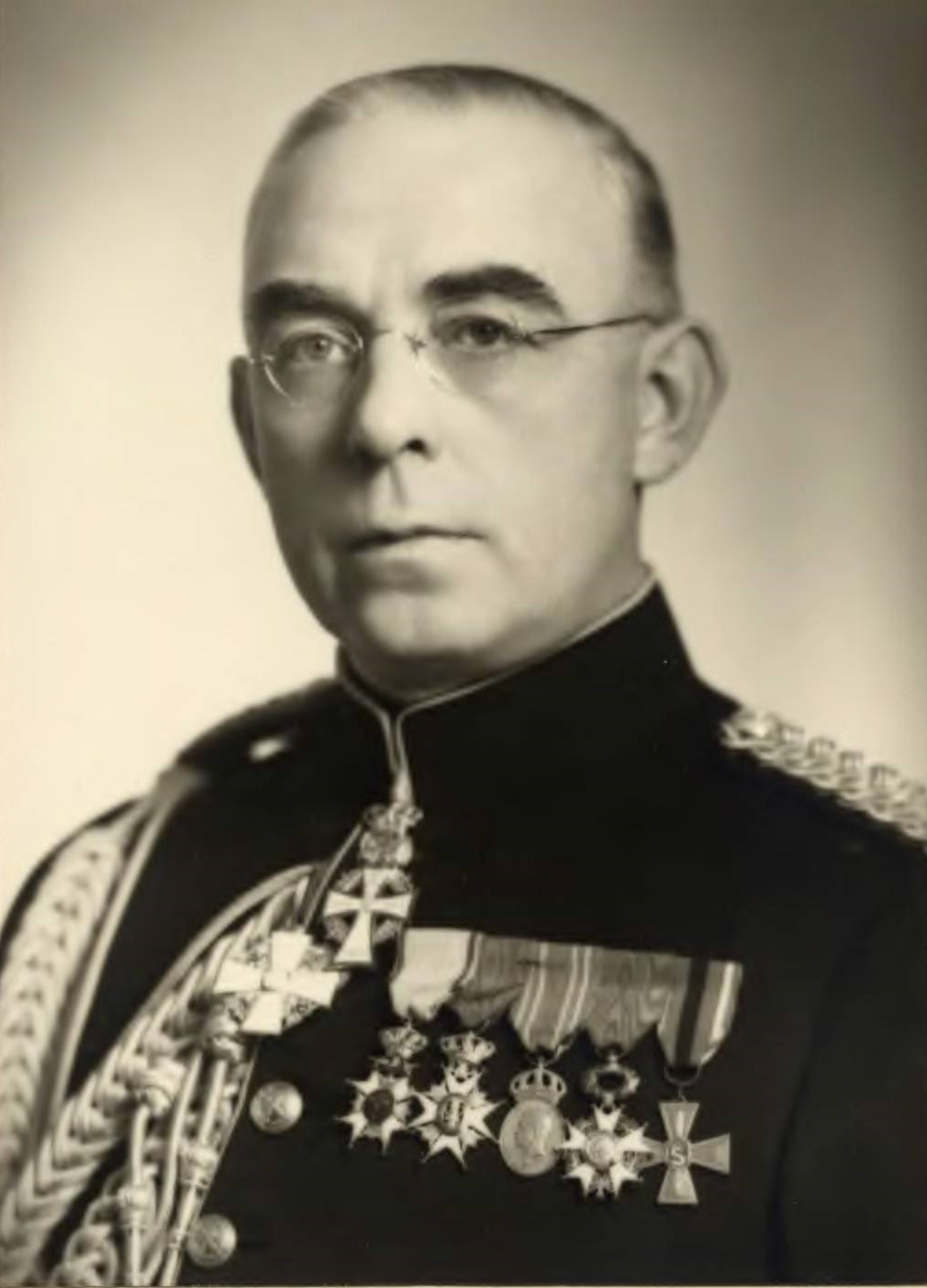
- Born: Axel Fredrik Carlos Adlercreutz; 26 January 1890; Stockholm, Sweden
- Died: 7 October 1963 (aged 73); Enköping, Sweden
- Military career
- Allegiance: Sweden
- Branch: Swedish Army
- Service years: 1910–1945
- Rank: Colonel
- Commands: International Dep., General Staff; Intelligence Dep., Defence Staff

Colonel Axel Fredrik Carlos Adlercreutz (26 January 1890 – 7 October 1963) was a Swedish Army officer. Adlercreutz is credited with the formation of the General Security Service (Allmänna säkerhetstjänsten) in 1938 (predecessor of the Swedish Security Service), and the intelligence agency C-byrån in 1939.

== Early life ==
Adlercreutz was born on 26 January 1890 in Stockholm, Sweden, the son of count and major Carl Adlercreutz and his wife Jeanna (née Evers). He passed studentexamen in 1908.

== Career ==
Adlercreutz was commissioned as an officer in 1910 with the rank of second lieutenant and was assigned to Svea Life Guards (I 1). Adlercreutz received a Candidate of Law degree in Stockholm in 1916. He then attended the Royal Swedish Army Staff College from 1918 to 1920, the French War College from 1920 to 1922 and did a course at the French Air Force in 1922. He was promoted to captain in 1925 and served in the General Staff in 1926. Adlercreutz was expert assistance of Sweden's representative at the League of Nations' disarmament commission from 1929 to 1931 and then served as military attaché in Helsinki from 1932 to 1935.

He was a major in the General Staff in 1933 and served in Älvsborg Regiment (I 15) in 1935 and was promoted to lieutenant colonel in 1936. Adlercreutz was head of the International Department of the General Staff in 1936 and then the Intelligence Department of the Defence Staff from 1937 to 1942. Adlercreutz was promoted to colonel in 1939 and served again as military attaché in Helsinki from 1942 to 1945. He was back serving in the Defence Staff in 1945, the same year he retired from active service. Adlercreutz remained in the General Staff Corps' reserve until 1960.

Adlercreutz became a member of the Royal Swedish Academy of War Sciences in 1944. He wrote essays in journals and was editor of Arméer, flottor och flyg ("Armies, navies and air") from 1938 to 1941.

== Personal life ==
In 1944 he married Louise Lovén (1916–1979), the daughter of Colonel Fredrik Lovén and the Baroness Elisabet af Ugglas. He was the father of Thomas (born 1944) and Gustaf (born 1946). After his retirement he ran Brunsholms Manor in Enköping.

== Death ==
He died in Enköpings-Näs Parish on 7 October 1963 and was buried at Norra begravningsplatsen in Stockholm.

== Awards and decorations ==
=== Swedish ===
- (Sweden) Commander of the Order of the Sword
- (Sweden) Knight of the Order of the Polar Star
- (Sweden) Knight of the Order of Vasa
- (Sweden) Swedish Civil Protection Association Medal of Merit in gold
- (Sweden) Swedish Civil Protection Association Medal of Merit in silver

=== Foreign ===
- (Denmark) Commander of the Order of the Dannebrog
- (Finland) 1st Class of the Order of the Cross of Liberty with swords
- (Finland) 2nd Class of the Order of the Cross of Liberty with swords
- Commander of the Order of the White Rose of Finland
- (Latvia) Commander of the Order of the Three Stars
- (Netherlands) Commander of the Order of Orange-Nassau with swords
- (Norway) Commander of the Order of St. Olav
- (Poland) Commander of the Order of Polonia Restituta
- (Nazi Germany) 1st Class of the Order of the German Eagle
- (France) Officer of the Legion of Honour
- Commander of the Order of Merit of the Kingdom of Hungary

== Bibliography ==
- Adlercreutz, A.F. Carlos (1970). Fredrik Thomas Adlercreutz 1796–1852: en levnadsteckning [Fredrik Thomas Adlercreutz 1796–1852: a biography] (in Swedish). Saltsjöbaden: Släktfören. Adlercreutz. SELIBR 840077.

Military offices
Preceded by None	Defence Staff's Intelligence Department; 1937–1942	Succeeded by Daniel Landquist
