= Eric Hallgren =

Swedish police and civil servant (1880 - 1956)

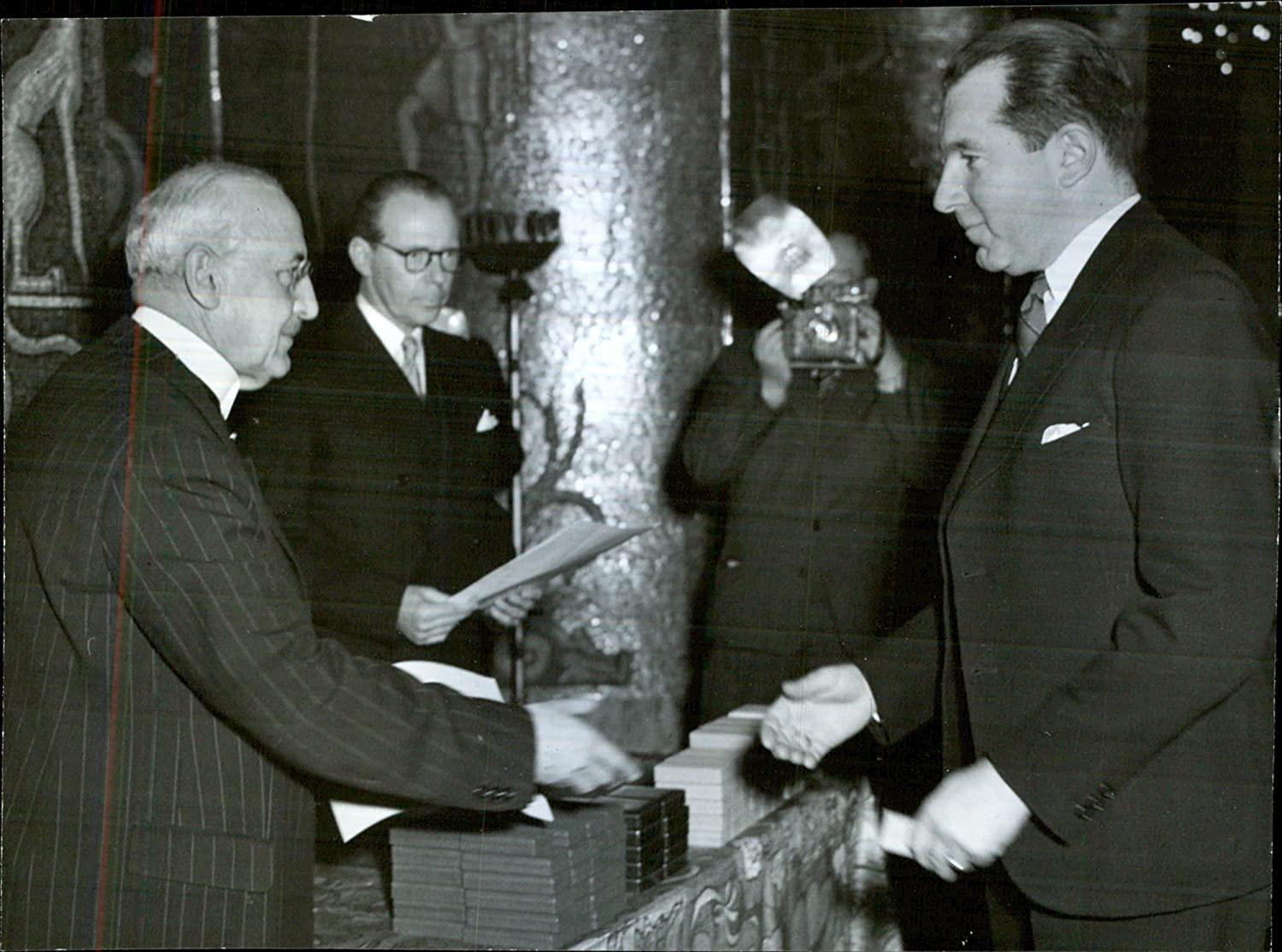
The Lieutenant-Governor of Stockholm, Eric Hallgren (left), presents a plaque from Riksluftskyddsförbundet to the head of Stockholms Spårvägar, Torsten Åström (right)

Eric Salomon Hallgren (20 October 1880 – 17 October 1956) was a Swedish police and civil servant. He was the first chief of the General Security Service (Allmänna säkerhetstjänsten), the predecessor of the Swedish Security Service (Säpo), serving from 1938 to 1945.

== Early life and education ==
Hallgren was born 20 October 1880 in Hedvig Eleonora Parish, Stockholm, Sweden the son of And. Salomon Hallgren, a police inspector, and his wife Fanny (née Strömmers). He completed his civil service degree in law (hovrättsexamen) at Uppsala University in 1905.

== Career ==
Following his graduation Hallgren served as notary at the Office of the Governor of Stockholm for police matters in 1910. Hallgren was acting police inspector and director of the Detective Department in 1917 and was 3rd Superintendent and director of the Criminal Department the same year. He was also a member of the police force in Schleswig during the 1920 Schleswig plebiscites.

Hallgren conducted study trips to England and France in 1920 and participated in international police congresses in New York City in 1923, Vienna in 1923, Berlin in 1926, Antwerp in 1930, Paris in 1931, Copenhagen in 1935, and Belgrade in 1936. Hallgren served as chief superintendent from 1930 to 1936 and deputy governor of Stockholm (Underståthållare) from 1937 Between 1931 and 1938 he served as the Swedish commissioner of the International Criminal Police Commission (today Interpol), an organization initiated in 1923 by several European and non-European countries. His tenure ended in 1938 when Erik Ros was named as the commissioner to the organization. Hallgren became chairman of the Stockholms luftskyddsförbund ("Stockholm Air Protection Association") in 1938.

When the Swedish civil security service, Hemliga statspolisen ("Secret State Police") or General Security Service (Allmänna säkerhetstjänsten) was established after a government decision on 10 June 1938, the operations was led by Hallgren. It was first organized as a secret department around the 6th Division within the Criminal Police (Kriminalpolisen) and was for a long time called Svestapo or Hestapo (after Gestapo) by those concerned. Hallgren left the position in 1945 and was succeeded by Georg Thulin.

== Personal life ==
In 1909, he married Ellen Hildur Boqvist (born 1876), the daughter of Per Ad. Boqvist and Hilda Nyström.

Hallgren died on 17 October 1956 in the same parish he was born.

== Awards and decorations ==
Hallgren's awards:

- Commander Grand Cross of the Order of the Polar Star
- Knight of the Order of Vasa
- Grand Officer of the Order of Leopold II
- Commander First Class of the Order of the Dannebrog
- Commander First Class of the Order of the White Star
- Commander of the Order of the White Rose of Finland
- Knight of the Order of St. Olav
- Commander Second Class of the Order of Civil Merit
- Officier de l'Instruction Publique

Civic offices
Preceded by Richard Bring	Deputy Governor of Stockholm; 1937–1945	Succeeded by Martin Wahlbäck
Preceded by None	Chief of the General Security Service; 1938–1945	Succeeded by Georg Thulin
