= KGB Espionage Museum =

Former museum in New York City

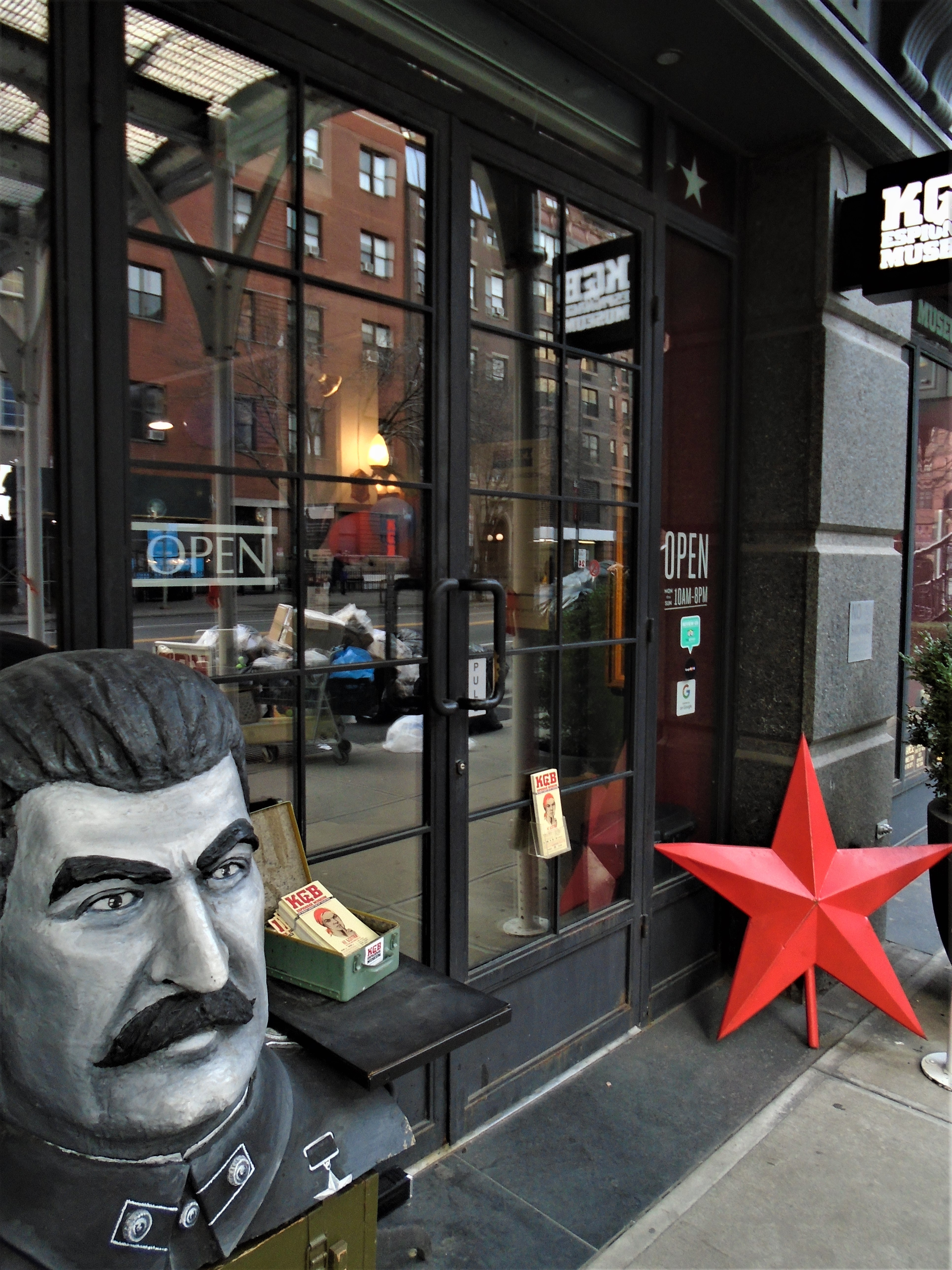

- Location within Manhattan
- Former name: KGB Spy Museum
- Established: January 17, 2019
- Location: 245 West 14th St., New York, New York, United States
- Coordinates: 40.737358°N 73.997451°W
- Type: History Museum
- Collection size: Over 3,900 Objects
- Website: https://kgbespionagemuseum.org/

The KGB Espionage Museum was a museum dedicated to the unbiased presentation of historical and contemporary KGB espionage equipment and tradecraft. The museum opened in the Chelsea and Greenwich Village neighborhoods of Manhattan in New York City on January 17, 2019, and featured the world's largest collection of KGB-specific spy equipment. The museum offered interactive exhibits and guided tours. The museum closed in fall 2020 due to the impact of COVID-19 and its contents were auctioned.

== History and formation ==
The museum in Manhattan was founded in 2019 by Lithuanian father and daughter team Julius Urbaitis and Agne Urbaityte. The collection began under private ownership by Mr. Urbaitis in Lithuania where their first museum opened in an old KGB bunker. The majority of the collection was brought to the United States and was available for public view for the first time.

== Permanent collection ==
The KGB Espionage Museum was 4,000 sq. feet (370 sq. meters) and exhibited over 3900 objects. The collection consists of original pieces and two replicas. Prize objects include a lipstick gun known as the "Kiss of Death", a Fialka Machine (the Russian version of the Enigma Machine), and a suicide tooth filled with poison.

=== Exhibitions ===
The museum divided their collection into the following rough categories:

- Spy Cameras
- Recording Devices
- Concealed Listening Devices
- Cipher Machines
- Spy Radios
- KGB Telephones

=== Interactive exhibits ===
The KGB Espionage Museum offered several areas of interactivity for visitors such as:

- A KGB Interrogation Chair
- Morse Keys
- Switchboards
- KGB Chief's Desk
- Robotic Arm
- KGB Prison Bed
- KGB Uniform Photo Booth

== Tours ==
- "Guided Tour": A guided experience
- "Dark Side of the KGB" Tour: A guided tour of the museum in the dark using soviet flashlights
- "Come Back in the USSR 1991" Tour: Experiential tour where the visitor dresses as a KGB cadet, learns how to put on a gas mask, and experiences a KGB interrogation
