= Swedish Security Service =

Law enforcement and counter-terrorism agency of the Swedish government

- Säkerhetspolisen
- Coat of arms of Säkerhetspolisen

Agency overview
- Formed: 1 October 1989
- Preceding agency: Security Department of the Realm Police Board
- Headquarters: Bolstomtavägen 2, Solna, Sweden; 59°21′09.5″N 18°00′38.3″E
- Employees: Approximately 1,400 (2020)
- Annual budget: SEK 1.56 billion (2019)
- Minister responsible: Gunnar Strömmer, Minister for Justice
- Agency executive: Charlotte von Essen, since 26 August 2021, Director-General
- Parent agency: Ministry of Justice
- Website: www.sakerhetspolisen.se

The Swedish Security Service (Swedish: Säkerhetspolisen, commonly Säpo) is a Swedish government agency responsible for counter-espionage, counter-terrorism, protecting the democratic system, and providing security for senior political figures and visiting foreign dignitaries. Although primarily focused on prevention, the agency also investigates crimes against national security and terrorist offences.

Originally the security department of the National Police Board (Rikspolisstyrelsens säkerhetsavdelning), the service took its present form in 1989 and became an independent government agency on 1 January 2015. Its headquarters are in Solna, near Stockholm.

== History ==
The origins of the Swedish Security Service date to 1914, when the General Staff established a special police bureau (Polisbyrån) to investigate threats to national security, particularly espionage. Its first chief was Captain Erik af Edholm. The bureau was dissolved after the First World War in 1918, but security policing continued in Stockholm under Chief Superintendent Eric Hallgren. Surveillance initially focused on communists and expanded to include Nazis in the early 1930s. In 1932, responsibility passed to the newly established State Police (statspolisen).

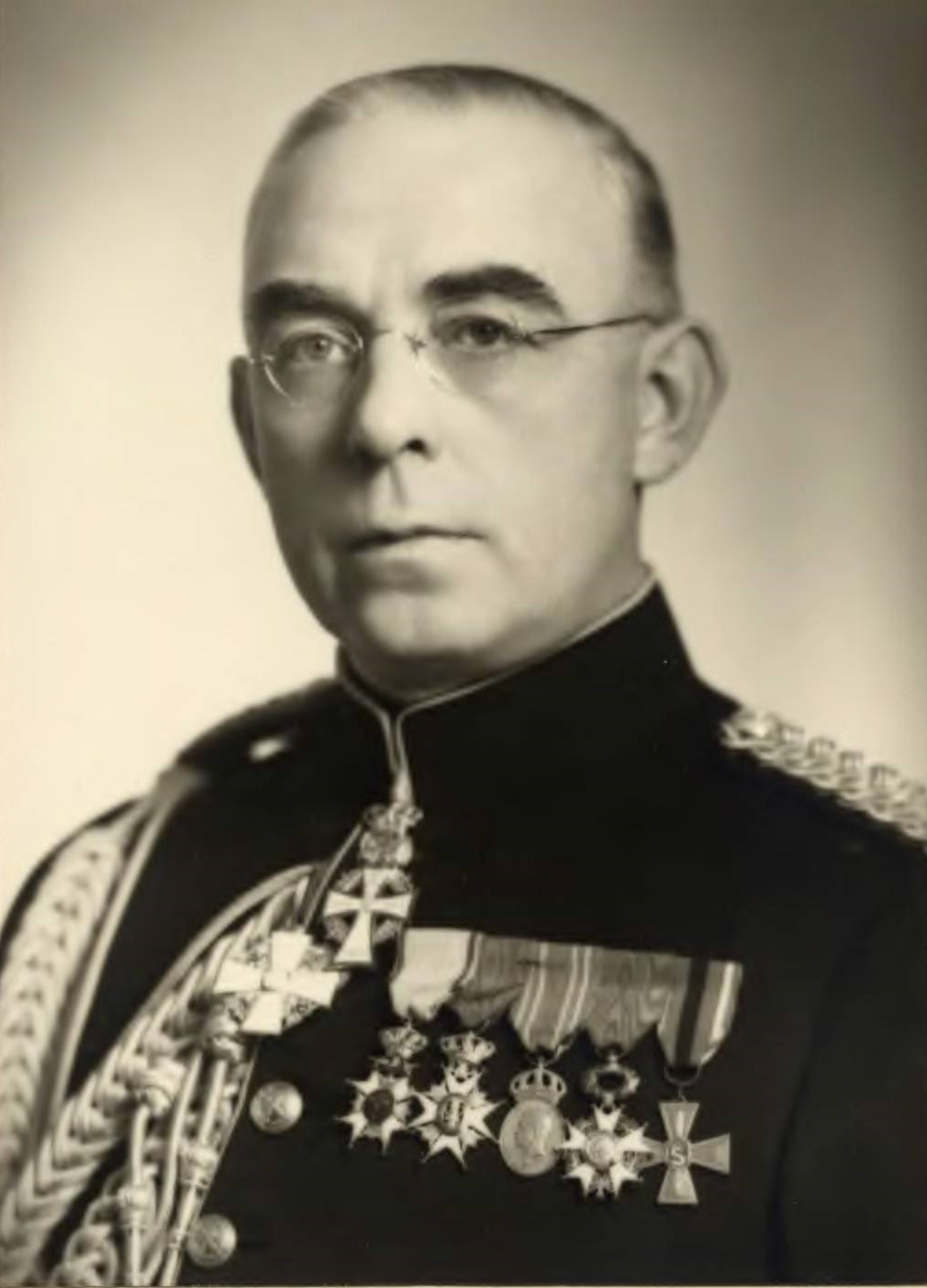
Lieutenant-Colonel Carlos Adlercreutz, who helped establish the General Security Service in 1938.

Concern about another European war led to calls for a stronger security service. The State Police lacked sufficient personnel, funding and powers to intercept communications, prompting Lieutenant-Colonel Carlos Adlercreutz, head of military intelligence, and Ernst Leche of the Ministry of Justice to support the establishment of the General Security Service (Allmänna säkerhetstjänsten) in 1938. Its existence and operations were secret. During the Second World War, the service monitored approximately 25,000 telephone calls and intercepted more than 200,000 letters each week. After the war, operations were substantially reduced and returned to the State Police in 1946, with counter-espionage as the main responsibility.

The Cold War brought continued concerns about Soviet espionage. Among those convicted of spying for the Soviet Union were Fritiof Enbom, Hilding Andersson, Stig Wennerström and Stig Bergling. In 1965, the nationalisation of the Swedish police placed security operations under the National Police Board, within its Department of Security (Rikspolisstyrelsens säkerhetsavdelning, abbreviated RPS/SÄK).

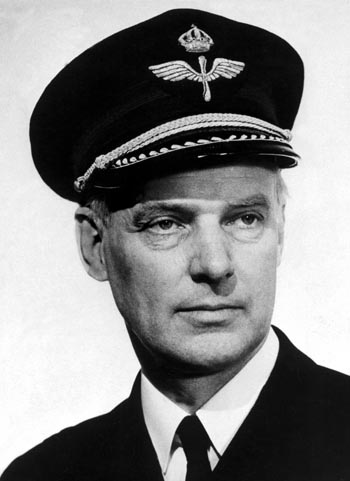
Stig Wennerström, convicted of spying for the Soviet Union, c. 1960.

During the early 1970s, several attacks by Croatian separatists brought greater attention to terrorism in Sweden. These included the assassination of the Yugoslav ambassador in Stockholm in 1971 and the hijacking of Scandinavian Airlines System Flight 130 in 1972. The attacks contributed to the introduction of Sweden's first anti-terrorism legislation in 1973, which allowed authorities to refuse entry to or deport certain foreign nationals associated with organisations that used political violence. The Department of Security also received additional resources.

The assassination of Prime Minister Olof Palme on 28 February 1986 raised questions about the protection of senior political figures and the work of the security services. The subsequent Ebbe Carlsson affair, exposed in 1988, led to further scrutiny and changes in police leadership, including the departures of National Police Commissioner Nils Erik Åhmansson and security department head Sune Sandström.

Following a government review, the Swedish Security Service was established in its modern form on 1 October 1989. Although it remained part of the National Police Board, the service gained greater independence, its own Director-General and increased political oversight. It also assumed full responsibility for close protection, previously shared with the National Police Board and Stockholm County Police.

The assassination of Foreign Minister Anna Lindh in September 2003 prompted another review of security arrangements and changes to the service's close protection operations, including a doubling of its bodyguard personnel. On 1 January 2015, the Swedish Security Service became an independent government agency as part of a wider reorganisation of the Swedish police.

== Areas of responsibility ==
The Swedish Security Service is responsible for five core areas of national security:

=== Counter-espionage ===
Prevention and detection of espionage and other illegal intelligence activities directed at Sweden, its national interests abroad, and foreign interests and individuals in Sweden.

=== Counter-subversion ===
Countering illegal subversive activities aimed at influencing political decisions or restricting constitutional rights and freedoms, including violence, threats and harassment directed at elected representatives, public officials and journalists.

=== Counter-terrorism ===
Prevention and detection of terrorism, including acts directed at Sweden or foreign interests in Sweden, as well as financing and support of terrorist organisations.

=== Dignitary protection ===
Provision of security and close protection officers for state visits, senior public officials, members of the Royal Family and foreign diplomatic representatives.

As of 2014, the Service employed 130 close protection officers.

=== Protective security ===
Provision of advice, analysis and oversight to government agencies and companies important to national security, including background checks.

== Organisation ==
The Swedish Security Service has been a separate government agency under the Ministry of Justice since 1 January 2015. Like other Swedish government agencies, it is constitutionally protected from interference in individual decisions involving the exercise of public authority or the application of law, under Chapter 12, Article 2 of the 1974 Instrument of Government.

The agency is headed by a Director-General, assisted by a Deputy Director-General. According to a 2024 report by the Swedish National Audit Office, its organisation consists of departments divided into units, sections and groups.

=== Organisation in 2015 ===
In 2015, the service comprised four departments and a secretariat for management support. Operations were overseen by a Chief Operating Officer, assisted by a deputy and an Office for Operations. The Chief Operating Officer reported directly to the Director-General and coordinated activities including counter-espionage, counter-terrorism and counter-subversion.

The departments and secretariat had the following responsibilities: (Note: Based on an organisational chart and an English-language description published by the Swedish Security Service in 2015.)

- Department of Intelligence Collection: Gathered intelligence through surveillance, personal contacts and technical methods. Regional units conducted human intelligence operations and supported headquarters.
- Department of Security Intelligence: Processed and analysed intelligence to support decisions on security measures.
- Department of Security Measures: Worked to reduce threats and vulnerabilities through close protection, investigations, information security, physical security and background checks.
- Department for Central Support Functions: Provided administrative, technical and logistical support.
- Secretariat for Management Support: Supported the agency's leadership through financial management, human resources, legal affairs, communications and other functions.

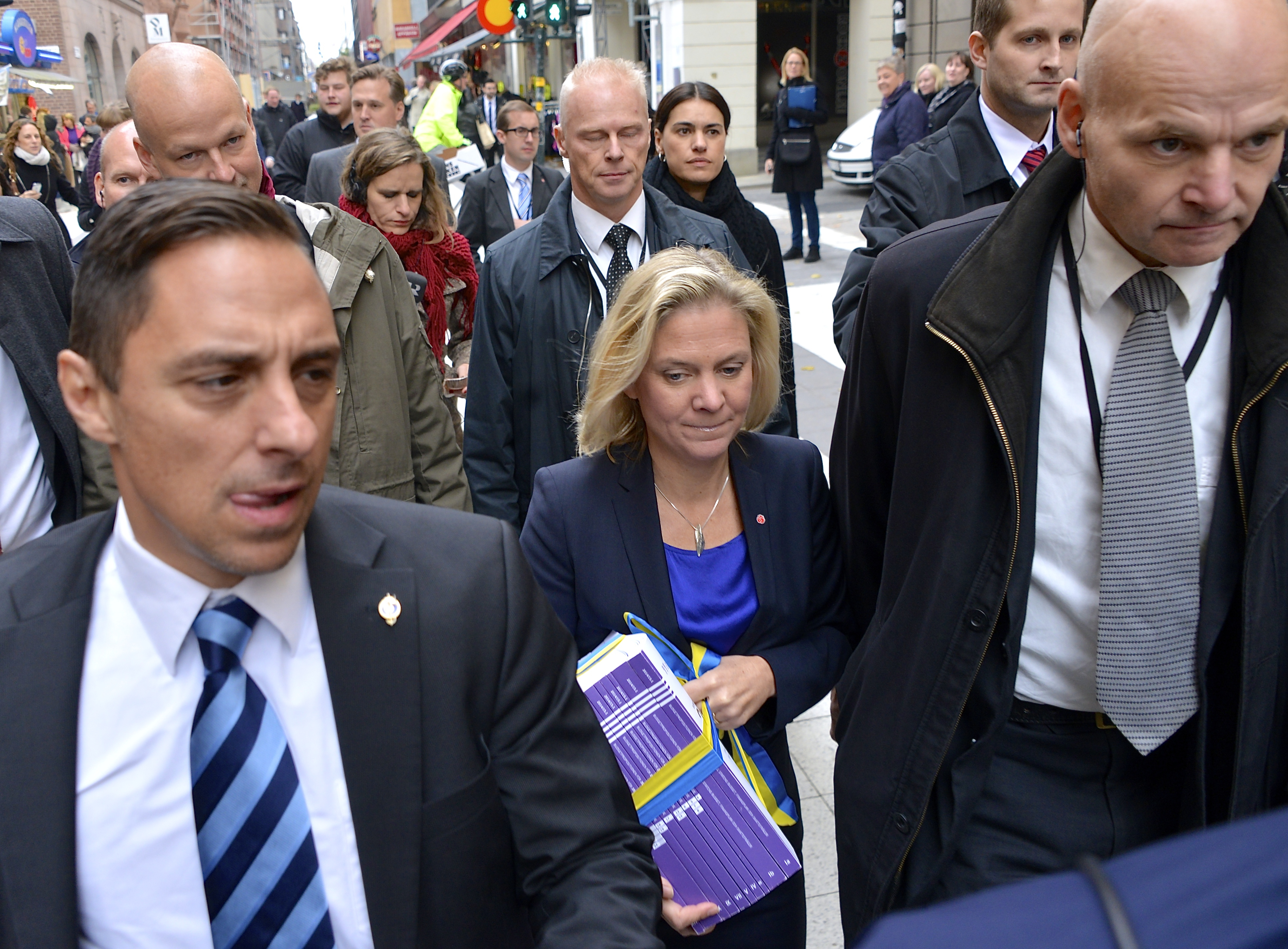
Swedish Security Service close protection officers accompanying Minister for Finance Magdalena Andersson in 2014.

== Reorganization ==
Sweden's Foreign Minister, Maria Malmer Stenergard announced the cteation of a formal civilian Inteligance agency termed the Sveriges utrikes underrättelsetjänst or UND focused on foreign Intelligence. The UND will absorb responcibility for Covert Human Intelligence HUMINT and will work alongside MUST on military Intelligence and Säpo on domestic Intelligence.

=== Offices ===
The Service has a regional presence and operates from several locations; from its headquarters in Solna and from six regional units with offices in Umeå, Uppsala, Örebro, Norrköping, Gothenburg and Malmö. The Service has approximately 1,100 employees, of which about 10 percent are stationed at the regional offices. The regional units are based on the geographic boundaries of several counties:

North – Västernorrland, Jämtland, Västerbotten and Norrbotten
Central – Uppsala, Västmanland and Gävleborg
Bergslagen – Värmland, Örebro and Dalarna
East – Södermanland, Östergötland and Jönköping
West – Halland and Västra Götaland
South – Kronoberg, Kalmar, Blekinge and Skåne
Stockholm – Stockholm and Gotland

=== Head of the Swedish Security Service ===
List of current and past executive officers:

- Mats Börjesson (1989–1994)
- Anders Eriksson (1994–1999)
- Jan Danielsson (2000–2003)
- Klas Bergenstrand (2004–2007)
- Anders Danielsson (2007–2012)
- Anders Thornberg (2012–2018)
- Klas Friberg (2018–2021)
- Charlotte von Essen (2021– )

== In popular culture ==
The Security Service's role in Cold War counterintelligence is referred to in the second and third novels of the best-selling Millennium series by Swedish writer Stieg Larsson.

"Swedish intelligence" was frequently referenced on the American Cold War spy drama television show The Americans. The male lead character on the show, Philip Jennings, had an alias who allegedly worked for Swedish intelligence.

== See also ==
- List of intelligence agencies
- List of protective service agencies
- National Defence Radio Establishment
- Säpojoggen
- Swedish Military Intelligence and Security Service
