= Palme family =

Prominent Swedish family

The Palme Family
- Current region: Sweden
- Members: Olof Palme, Prime Minister of Sweden; Rajani Palme Dutt, General Secretary of Communist Party of Great Britain
- Connected families: von Sydow family, Wallenberg family, Kreuger family, Lagercrantz family

The Palme family is a prominent Swedish family. A family with many members who have evolved into successful persons, the family includes one Swedish prime minister. The most notable member of the Palme family is Olof Palme who served two terms as Prime Minister of Sweden from 1969 to 1976 and from 1982 until his assassination in 1986.

The Palme family is derived from a skipper, the Dutch Palme Lyder, who settled in Ystad (at the time part of then Danish Scania) in the 1600s. The family is related to several other prominent Swedish families such as the von Sydow family, the Wallenberg family, the Kreuger family and the Lagercrantz family.

== Relations ==
This list contains only one branch of the Palme family:

- Sven Palme (1854–1934), politician, businessman
- Hanna Palme (1861–1959), wife of Sven, daughter of Johan August von Born and Hedvig Lovisa Fransiska von Haartman
  - Olof Palme (1884–1918), historian, oldest son of Sven
  - Ola Tenow (1888–1982), wife of Olof Palme
    - Sven Ulric Palme (1912–1977), historian and university professor, eldest son of Olof and Ola
    - Barbro von Vegesack (1912–1998), wife of Sven Ulric
      - Jacob Palme (1941–), university professor and author, eldest son of Sven Ulric and Barbro
      - Thomas Palme (1944–), ambassador, son of Sven Ulric and Barbro
      - Christian Palme (1952–), journalist, youngest son of Sven Ulric and Barbro
    - Rutger Palme (1910–1995), politician, youngest son of Olof and Ola
  - Gunnar Palme (1886–1934), businessman, son of Sven
  - Elisabeth von Knieriem (1890–1972), wife of Gunnar, daughter of Woldemar von Knieriem och Elli Kupfer
    - Claës Palme (1917–2006), lawyer, eldest son of Gunnar and Elisabeth
    - Catharina Palme Nilzén (1920–2002), wife of physician Åke Nilzén, daughter of Gunnar and Elisabeth
    - Olof Palme (1927–1986), Prime Minister of Sweden 1969–1976 and 1982–1986, leader of the Social Democrats 1969–1986, youngest son of Gunnar and Elisabeth
    - Lisbet Palme (1931–2018), wife of Olof and psychologist, daughter of Christian Beck-Friis och Anna-Lisa Bolling
      - Joakim Palme (1958–), sociologist and university professor, eldest son of Olof and Lisbet
      - Ann–Sofie Östling (1958–), wife of Joakim
        - Joanna Östling Palme (1985–), daughter of Joakim
        - Jan–Erik Kylänpää (1986–), husband of Joanna
          - Arvid Eugene Palme (2019–) son of Joanna
        - David Östling Palme (1988–), son of Joakim
        - Clara Östling Palme (1990–), daughter of Joakim
      - Mårten Palme (1961–), university professor and economist, son of Olof and Lisbet
      - Maria Palme (1962–), former wife of Mårten
        - Cecilia Palme (1991–), daughter of Mårten
        - Johan Hallerth (1990–), husband of Cecilia
        - Kristin Palme (1994–), daughter of Mårten
        - Henrik Palme (1999–), son of Mårten
      - Johanna Adami (1969–), current wife of Mårten
        - Arthur Palme Adami (2012–), son of Mårten
      - Mattias Järvinen Palme (1968–), architect, youngest son of Olof and Lisbet
      - Åsa Fosshaug Palme (1967–), former wife of Mattias
        - Karin Palme (1998–), daughter of Mattias
        - Hedvig Palme (2002–), daughter of Mattias
      - Linnea Palme (1970–), former wife of Mattias
        - Axel Palme (2010–), son of Mattias
      - Anna Järvinen Palme (1970–), current wife of Mattias
      - Christoffer Gunnrup (1981–), former husband of Anna
        - Siri Gunnrup Järvinen (2002), daugheter of Anna
        - Harriet Gunnrup Järvinen (2006), daughter of Anna
  - Nils Palme (1895–1963), military officer, youngest son of Sven
  - Margareta Palme (1897–1975), wife of Nils
