= The Unlikely Murderer =

Swedish crime drama television series

- Swedish: Den Osannolika Mördaren
- Genre: Crime drama
- Based on: Den osannolika mördaren - Skandiamannen och mordet på Olof Palme by Thomas Pettersson
- Starring: Robert Gustafsson; Eva Melander; Björn Bengtsson
- Country of origin: Sweden
- Original language: Swedish
- No. of seasons: 1
- No. of episodes: 5

Production
- Production location: Sweden
- Running time: 43–52 minutes
- Production company: FLX

Original release
- Network: Netflix
- Release: 5 November 2021

The Unlikely Murderer (Swedish: Den Osannolika Mördaren) is a 2021 Swedish crime drama television series written by Wilhelm Behrman and Niklas Rockström. The series was praised for "its fine observations of male pride turned toxic" in The Guardian. Based on real-life events, the series is an adaption of the 2018 book The Unlikely Murderer, written by Thomas Pettersson, who worked as a writer on the show. It was reported in November 2021 that distributor Netflix is being sued for defamation for the show's representation of events.

== Cast ==
- Robert Gustafsson as Stig Engström
- Eva Melander as Margareta Engström
- Björn Bengtsson as Thomas Pettersson
- Magnus Krepper as Harry Levin
- Joel Spira as Lennart Granström
- Peter Viitanen as Olof Palme
- Cilla Thorell as Lisbeth Palme
- Bengt Braskered as Anders Skandiakollega
- Cia Eriksson as Kvinnlig väktare Skandia
- Maria Alm Norell as Charlotte Brändström
