= Claës Palme =

Swedish lawyer and politician

Johan Claës Woldemar Palme (31 May 1917 – 21 April 2006) was a Swedish lawyer who was specialized in maritime law. He was the son of Gunnar Palme and the brother of Swedish Prime Minister Olof Palme and of Catharina Palme Nilzén.

Claës Palme was maritime law expert and ran his own law firm. He was also a reservist in the Swedish Navy. The Soviet Union hired him to sue the Swedish Government as the Soviet ship Tsesis run aground at the entrance of Södertälje. He won the case, which attracted much attention because of his brother Olof Palme, who, concurrently served as Prime Minister of Sweden. Claës Palme was also the author of maritime items and a long-time representative for the Swedish Maritime Administration while in court.

He was an active politician of the Moderate Party (his brother Olof Palme represented the Social Democrats) and was for a period chairman of the parish council in the Engelbrekt Church assembly in central Stockholm. He took part in the demonstration against the employee funds that the October 4th Movement arranged on the day that employee funds would be dealt in the Swedish Riksdag. During certain periods, Palme lived on the French Riviera.

Claës Palme was one of the initiators of the transfer of the family estate Skangal in Latvia to the Salvation Army.
