= Psili koryfi =

Psili koryfi (Greek: Ψηλή Κορυφή 'high peak') may refer to the following mountains in Greece:

- the highest peak of the Acarnanian Mountains
- the highest peak of Mount Aroania
