= Stig Engström =

The name Stig Engström may refer to:

- Stig Engström (actor), born 14 January 1942
- Stig Engström (suspected murderer), 1934–2000, also known as The Skandia man
