= List of streets named after Olof Palme =

There are several streets named after Olof Palme, the former Swedish prime minister, assassinated in 1986.

The first street was renamed on 23 April 1986 in Stockholm. It was a major portion of the street Tunnelgatan, that crossed Sveavägen, that was renamed. It was in that very crossing where Palme was shot on 28 February 1986.

- Olof Palme Street, a street in Algiers, Algeria. 36.753843°N 3.042327°E.
- Olof Palme Garden, a park in Algiers, Algeria. 36.741810°N 3.031020°E.
- Calle Olof Palme, a short street in Saavedra, Buenos Aires, Argentina. 34.5505°S 58.4899°W
- Olof-Palme-Platz, a square in Traiskirchen, Austria.
- Olof-Palme-Platz, a square in Wiener Neustadt, Austria.
- Avenida Olof Palme, a street in Rio de Janeiro, Brazil.
- Olof Palmes Allé, a street in Aarhus, Denmark.
- Olof Palmes Gade, a street in Copenhagen, Denmark.
- Calle Olof Palme, a street in Santo Domingo, Dominican Republic.
- Boulevard Olof Palme, a boulevard in Émerainville, France.
- Boulevard Olof Palme, a boulevard in Hénin-Beaumont, France.
- Boulevard Olof Palme, a boulevard in Pau, France.
- Rue Olof Palme, a street in Créteil, France.
- Rue Olof Palme, a street in Clichy, France.
- Rue Olof Palme, a street in Montpellier, France.
- Rue Olof Palme, a street in Rezé, France.
- Olof-Palme-Platz, a square in Berlin, Germany.
- Olof-Palme-Platz, a square in Nuremberg, Germany.
- Olof-Palme-Platz, a square in Stralsund, Germany.
- Olof-Palme-Damm, a street (B76) in Kiel, Germany.
- Olof-Palme-Straße, a street in Augsburg, Germany.
- Olof-Palme-Straße, a street in Frankfurt am Main, Germany.
- Olof-Palme-Straße, a street in Leverkusen, Germany.
- Olof-Palme-Straße, a street in Munich, Germany.
- Πάρκο Ούλοφ Πάλμε, a park in Thessaloniki, Greece.
- Οδός Ούλοφ Πάλμε, a street in Vyronas, Athens, Greece.
- Οδός Ούλοφ Πάλμε, a street in Zografou, Athens, Greece.
- Οδός Ούλοφ Πάλμε, a street in Haidari, Greece.
- Οδός Ούλοφ Πάλμε, a street in Kaisariani, Greece.
- Οδός Ούλοφ Πάλμε, a street in Agioi Anargyroi, Greece.
- Οδός Ούλοφ Πάλμε, a street in Eleftherio-Kordelio, Thessaloniki, Greece.
- Οδός Ούλοφ Πάλμε, a street in Neapoli, Thessaloniki, Greece.
- Οδός Ούλοφ Πάλμε, a street in Stavroupoli, Thessaloniki, Greece.
- Οδός Ούλοφ Πάλμε, a street in Sindos, Greece.
- Οδός Ούλοφ Πάλμε, a street in Sykies, Thessaloniki, Greece.
- Οδός Ούλοφ Πάλμε, a street in Nea Malgara, Thessaloniki, Greece.
- Οδός Ούλοφ Πάλμε, a street in Neo Rysio, Thessaloniki, Greece.
- Οδός Ούλοφ Πάλμε, a street in Axioupoli, Greece.
- Οδός Ούλοφ Πάλμε, a street in Gefyra, Thessaloniki, Greece.
- Οδός Ούλοφ Πάλμε, a street in Heraklion, Greece.
- Οδός Ούλοφ Πάλμε, a street in Chania, Greece.
- Οδός Ούλοφ Πάλμε, a street in Rethymno, Greece.
- Οδός Ούλοφ Πάλμε, a street in Lefkada, Greece.
- Οδός Ούλοφ Πάλμε, a street in Kilkis, Greece.
- Οδός Ούλοφ Πάλμε, a street in Hermoupolis, Greece.
- Olof Palme Sétány, a street in Budapest, Hungary.
- Olof Palme Marg, a street in New Delhi, India.
- Olof Palme, a park in Sulemania, Iraq.
- Via Olof Palme, a street in Chiaravalle, Italy.
- Via Sven Olof Palme, a circular road that encircles the town of Bitonto, Italy.
- Via Olof Palme, a street in Ferrara, Italy.
- Via Olof Palme, a street in Nuoro, Italy.
- Via Olof Palme, a street in Cesena, Italy.
- Avenida Olof Palme, a street in Maputo, Mozambique.
- Olof Palmestraat, a street in Windhoek, Namibia.
- Olof Palmeplein, a square in Amsterdam, Netherlands
- Olof Palmelaan, a street in Beverwijk, Netherlands.
- Olof Palmelaan, a street in Zoetermeer, Netherlands.
- Olof Palmestraat, a street in Delft, Netherlands.
- S.O.J. Palmelaan, a street in Groningen, Netherlands.
- Olof Palmelaan, a street in Utrecht, Netherlands.
- Ulitsa Ulofa Pal'me (улица Улофа Пальме), a street in Moscow, Russia.
- Ulica Ulofa Palmea, a street in Belgrade, Serbia.
- Palmejeva ulica, a street in Ljubljana, Slovenia.
- Olof Palme Street, a street in Port Elizabeth, South Africa.
- Calle Olof Palme, a street in Alicante, Spain.
- Calle Olof Palme, a street in Badajoz, Spain.
- Calle Olof Palme, a street in Las Palmas, Spain.
- Plaza de Olof Palme, a square in Jimena de la Frontera, Spain.
- Calle Olof Palme, a street in Murcia, Spain.
- Calle Olof Palme, a street in Sabadell, Spain.
- Calle Olof Palme, a street in Valencia, Spain.
- Olof Palme, a park in Madrid, Spain.
- Plaça Olof Palme, a street in Terrassa, Spain.
- Plaza Olof Palme, a square in La Pola Siero, Spain.
- Olof Palmes gata, a street in Stockholm, Sweden.
- Olof Palmes gata, a street in Kalmar, Sweden.
- Olof Palmes gata, a street in Piteå, Sweden.
- Olof Palmes gata, a street in Trollhättan, Sweden.
- Olof Palmes gata, a street in Umeå, Sweden.
- Olof Palmes torg, a square in Örebro, Sweden.
- Olof Palmes torg, a square in Västerås, Sweden.
- Olof Palmes torg, a square in Sundsvall, Sweden.
- Olof Palmes plats, a square in Gothenburg, Sweden.
- Olof Palmes plats, a square in Malmö, Sweden.
- Olof Palmes plats, a square in Södertälje, Sweden.
- Olof Palmes plats, a square in Uppsala, Sweden.
- Olof Palmes väg, a street in Kungälv, Sweden.
- Olof Palmes väg, a street in Nyköping, Sweden.
- Olof Palme Caddesi, the main street of Kulu, Turkey.
- Olof Palme Human Rights Park, a park in İzmir, Turkey.
- Olof Palme Grove, a cul-de-sac in Stoke-on-Trent, United Kingdom.
- Улица Улоф Палме, a street in Skopje, North Macedonia. 41.986125°N 21.438180°E.

== See also ==
- List of Olof Palme memorials
