= List of Olof Palme memorials =

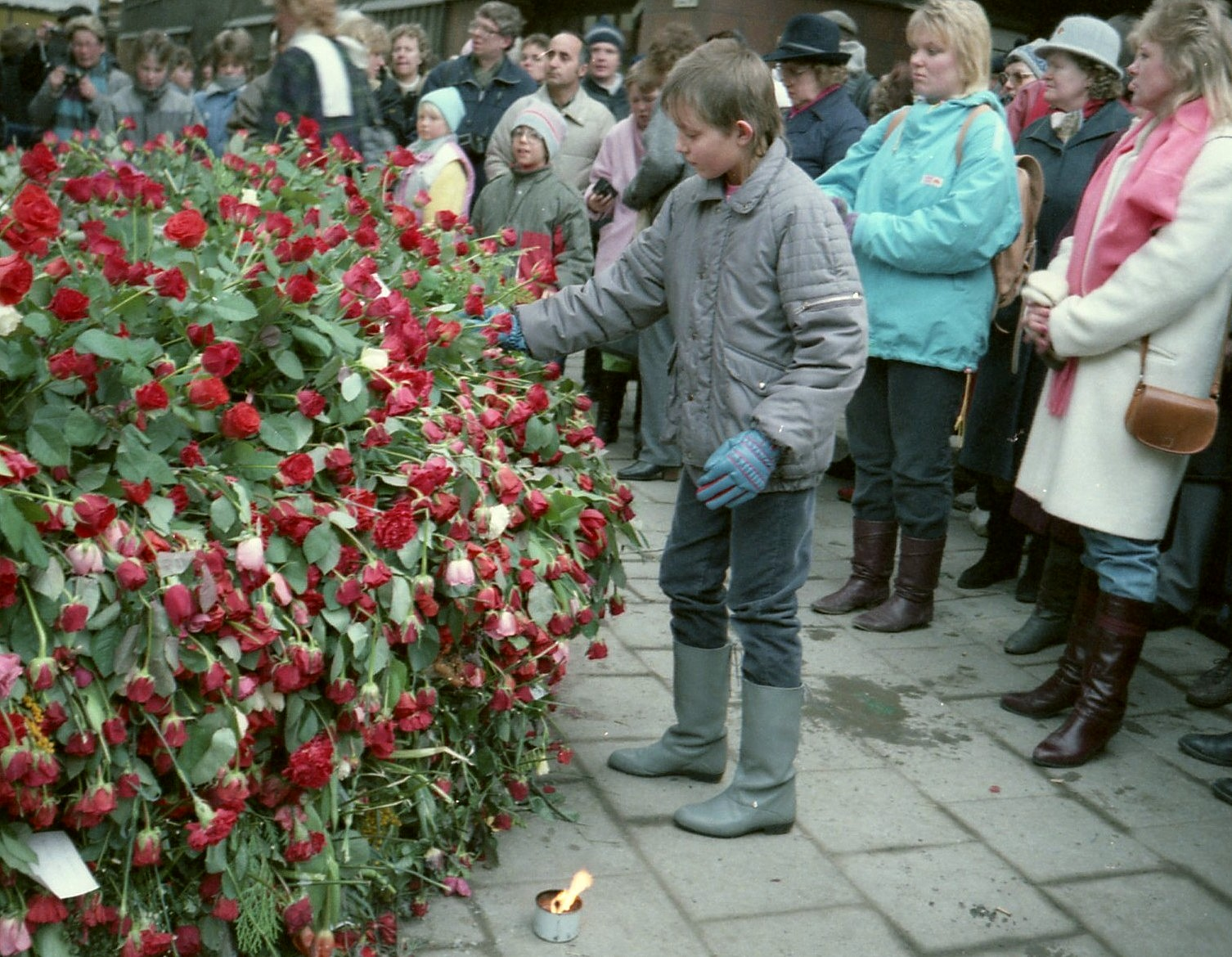
People mourning Palme where he was assassinated in Stockholm 1986

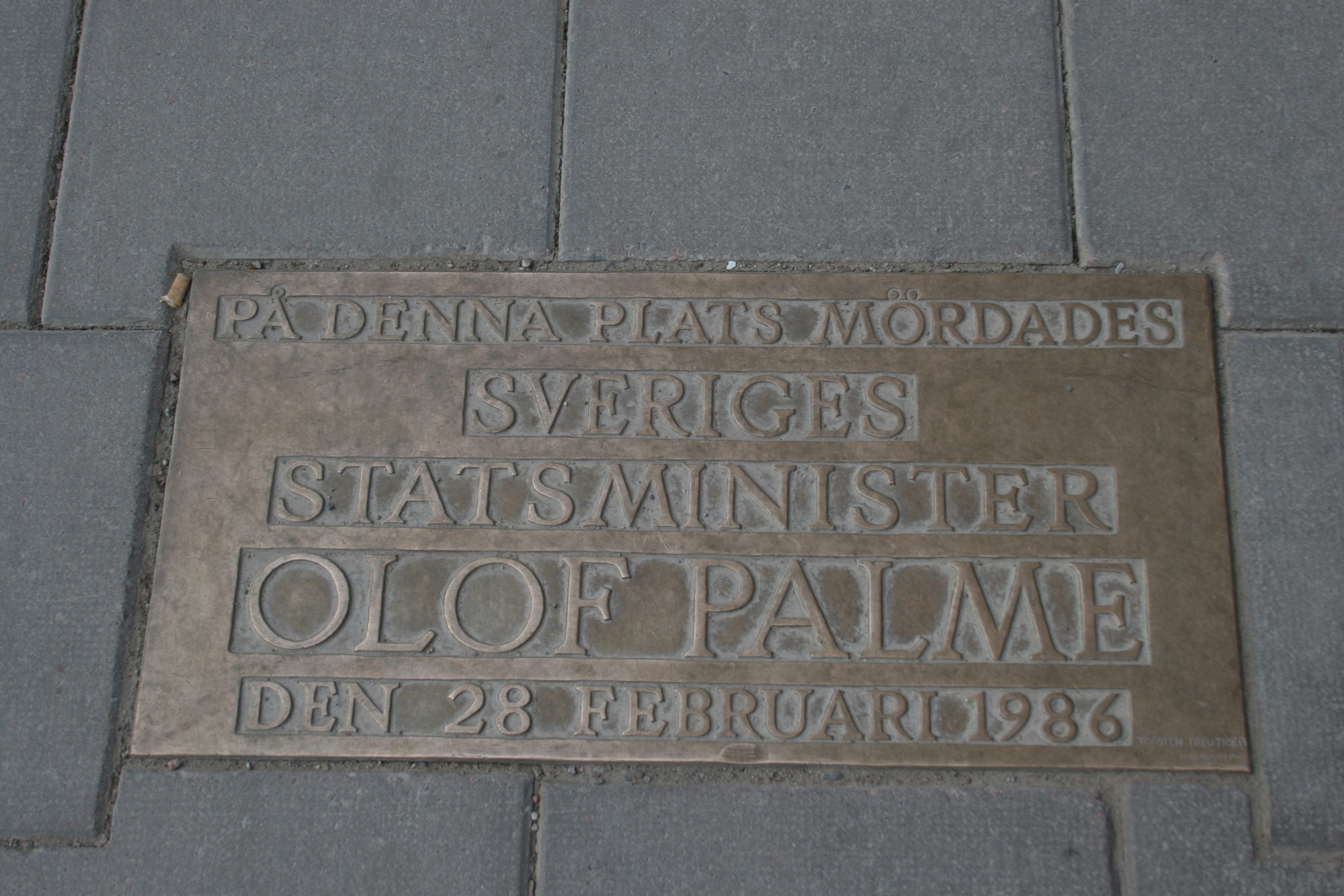
Memorial plaque at the place of the assassination, reading: "On this site, the Prime Minister of Sweden, Olof Palme, was murdered on 28 February 1986"

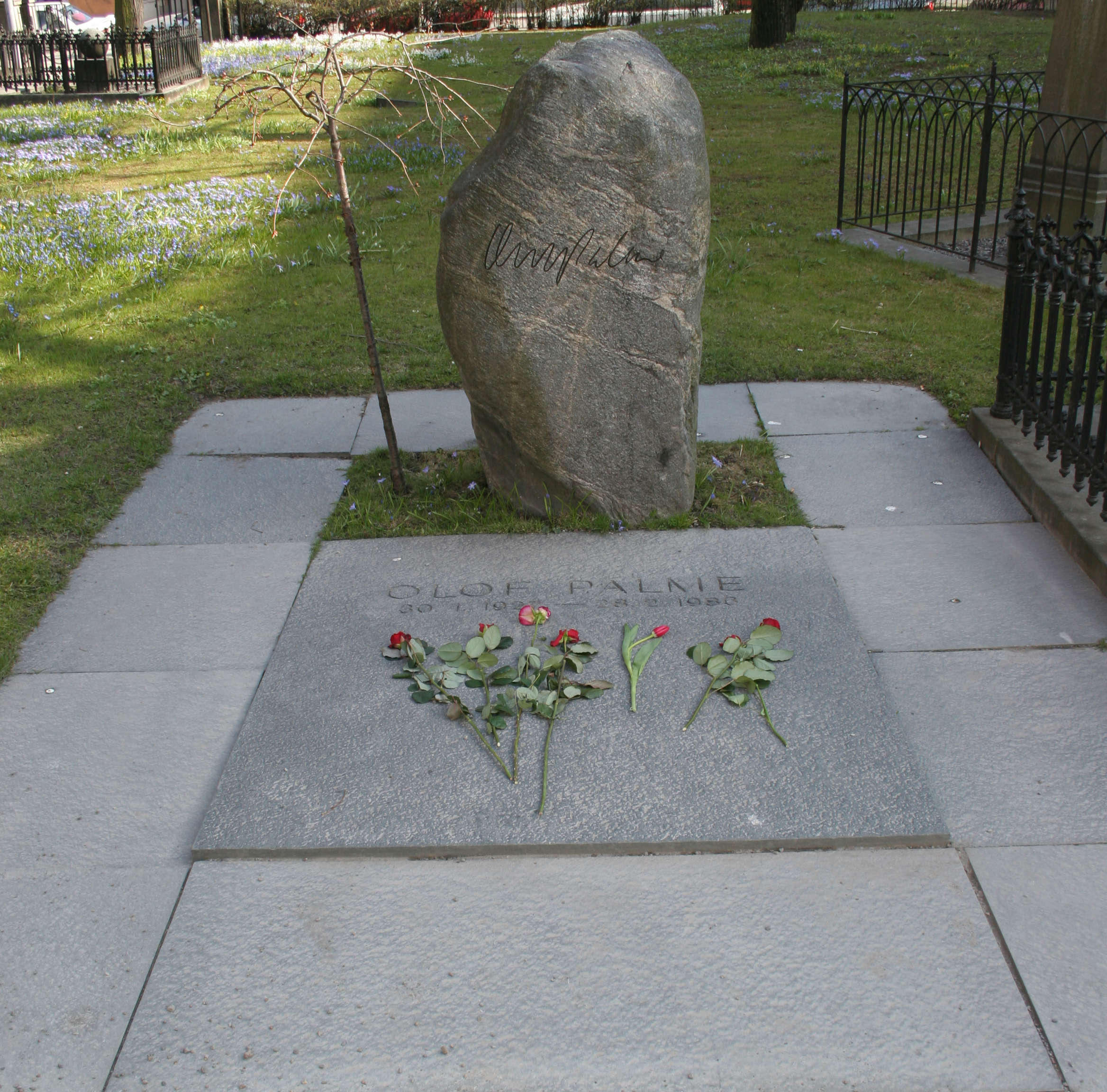
Palme's grave and monument at nearby Adolf Fredriks kyrka's cemetery

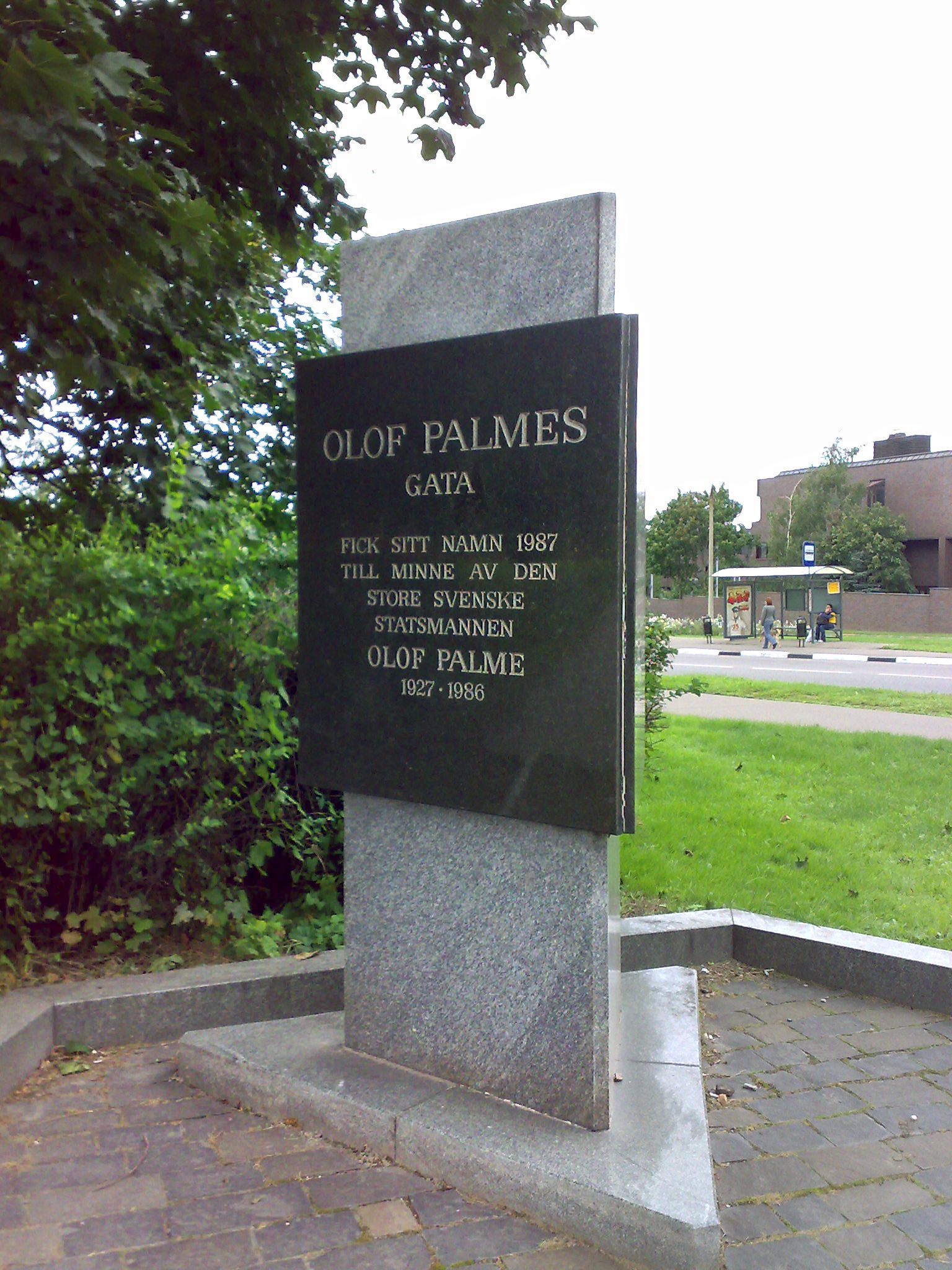
Memorial outside the embassy of Sweden in Moscow, marking the street named after Olof Palme

This is a list of Olof Palme memorials: places named in honor of Olof Palme, the assassinated Prime Minister of Sweden.

Country	Description	Name	Location
Algeria	Garden	Olof Palme Garden	Algiers 36.741810°N 3.031020°E
Brazil	School	Olof Palme	Rio de Janeiro
Cuba	School	Escuela Olof Palme	Havana
Germany	Park	Olof-Palme-Park	Cologne
Germany	Community Center	Olof-Palme Zentrum	Berlin
Germany	School	Olof Palme Schule	Hiddenhausen
Germany	Town hall (to be demolished)	Olof Palme Haus	Kassel
Greece	Park	Olof Palme	Thessaloniki
Greece	Museum	Olof Palme Museum	Mochos, Heraklion, Greece
Iraq	Park	Hadiket Olof Palme	Sulemania
Mexico	College	Colegio Olof Palme	Tlalpan, Mexico City
Namibia	School	Olof Palme Primary School	Katutura, Windhoek
Netherlands	School	Basisschool Olof Palme	Drunen
Nicaragua	Convention centre	Olof Palme Convention Centre	Managua
Spain	Park	Olof Palme Park	Madrid
Turkey	Park	Olof Palme Human Rights Park	İzmir
United States	College	Kenyon College- Palme House	Gambier, Ohio
Vietnam	Hospital	Olof Palme pediatric hospital	Hanoi, Vietnam

- The Olof Palme Memorial Fund for International Understanding and Common Security was established by Olof Palme's family and by the Social Democratic Party to honour his memory.

== See also ==
- List of streets named after Olof Palme
- Tunnelgatan
