= Korpi =

Korpi can refer to a number of things:

It is a Finnish-language surname. Notable people with the surname include:

- Henrik Korpi, Swedish songwriter and record producer
- Janne Korpi, Finnish snowboarder and harness racing driver
- Kiira Korpi, Finnish figure skater
- Norman Korpi, American painter, fashion designer, filmmaker and reality television star
- Pekka Korpi, Finnish harness racing trainer and driver
- Rauno Korpi, Finnish ice hockey coach
- Sture Korpi, Swedish politician
- Walter Korpi, Swedish sociologist

Korpi can also refer to a fresh water source and small settlement in the region of Aetoloakarnania, Greece
