= Mårten Palme =

Swedish economist

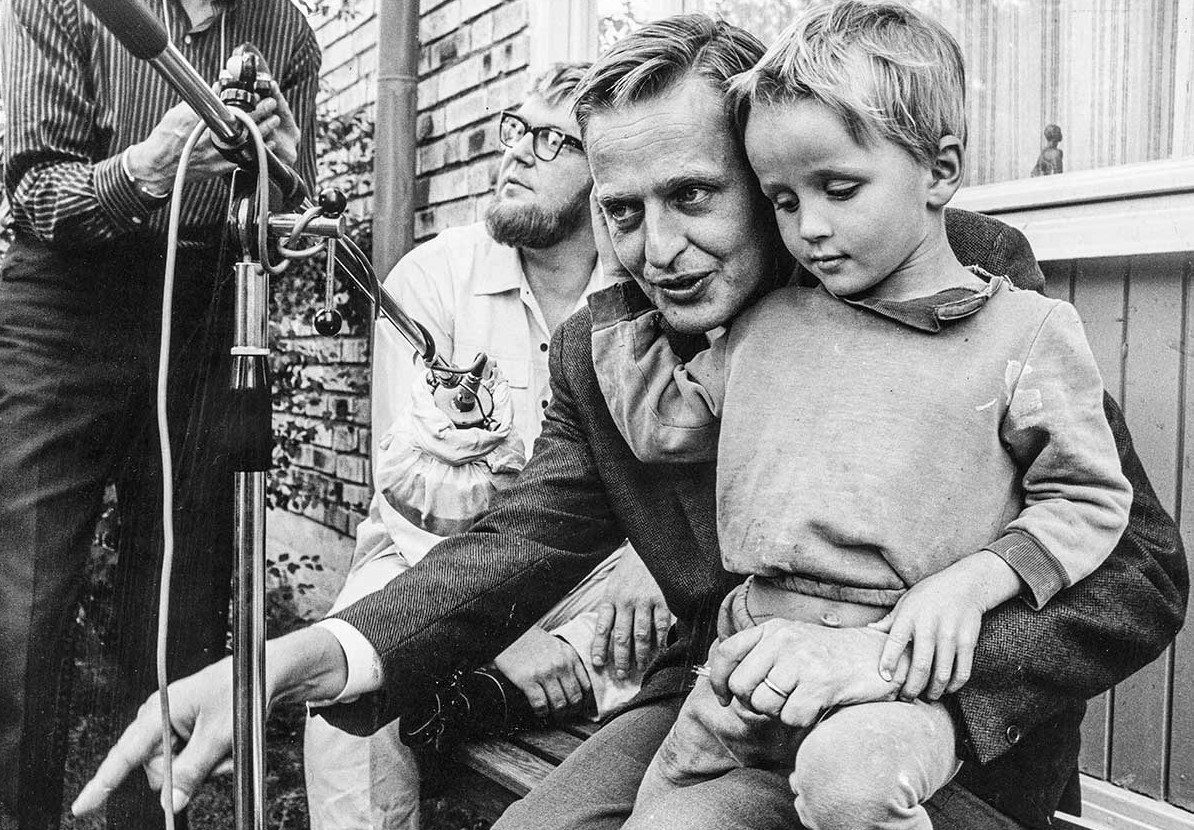
- Palme with his father in 1967
- Born: Mårten Olof Palme; 31 October 1961 (age 64); Stockholm, Sweden
- Occupation: Professor of Economics
- Spouse: Johanna Adami
- Children: 4
- Parents: Olof Palme (father); Lisbeth Palme (mother)
- Relatives: Joakim Palme (brother)

Mårten Olof Palme (born 31 October 1961) is a Swedish economist focusing on labor economics. He is a professor of economics at Stockholm University.

== Education and career ==
After earning a degree from Stockholm University in 1988, Palme completed a PhD at the Stockholm School of Economics in 1993. He worked at the Stockholm School of Economics before joining the Stockholm University faculty, and is a fellow of the IZA Institute of Labor Economics.

== Personal life ==
Palme belongs to the Palme family and is the second son of the late Swedish Prime Minister Olof Palme and his wife Lisbeth Palme, and the brother of Joakim and Mattias Palme.

On the evening of Olof Palme's assassination, Mårten Palme and his girlfriend had joined his parents and had been at the cinema Grand, where they watched The Mozart Brothers. When Mårten and his girlfriend left his parents after the cinema, they saw a man who followed Olof Palme. This man was recognized as the murderer of Olof Palme and has been called "Grandmannen". On 6 June in 2020, Stig Engström was recognized as the possible murderer.
