= Brunkeberg Tunnel =

Tunnel in Stockholm, Sweden

Coordinates: 59°20′13″N 18°03′52″E

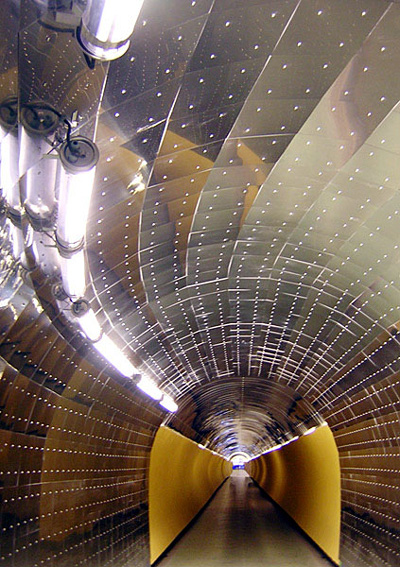

The Brunkeberg Tunnel (Swedish: Brunkebergstunneln) is a 231 m (758 ft)-long tunnel for pedestrians and cyclists connecting David Bagares Street to Tunnelgatan in central Stockholm. It passes through the esker Brunkebergsåsen and was inaugurated King Oscar II on 9 June 1886.

After opening, many Stockholmers continued using the above-ground road because it cost two öre to access the tunnel.

== See also ==
- Tunnelgatan
- Geography of Stockholm
