= Woldemar von Knieriem =

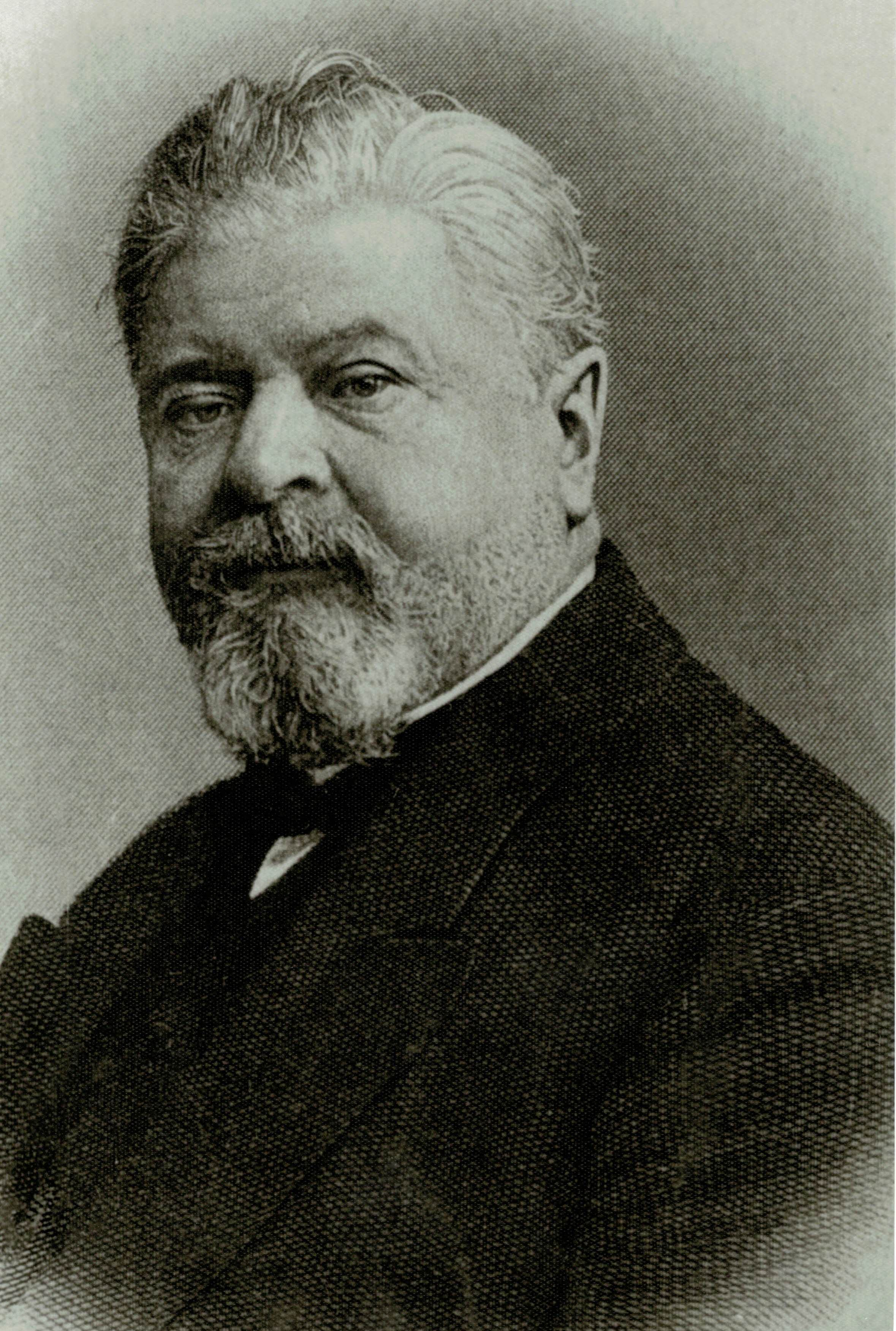
- Woldemar von Knieriem
- Born: 1 August 1849 (in Julian calendar)
- Died: 14 January 1935 (aged 85); Riga

Johann Karl Woldemar von Knieriem (1 August 1849 – 14 January 1935) was a Baltic German agricultural scientist and Riga Technical University faculty. He was the maternal grandfather to Olof Palme.

Von Knieriem was born in Gemäuerthof, Livonia, then part of the Russian Empire, the son of Johan August von Knieriem and Olga Elisabet von Dahl. Von Knieriem served as rector at Riga Technical University from 1906 to 1916.

Von Knieriem married Elli Kupfer.
