= Stig Engström (suspected murderer) =

One-time murder suspect (1934–2000)

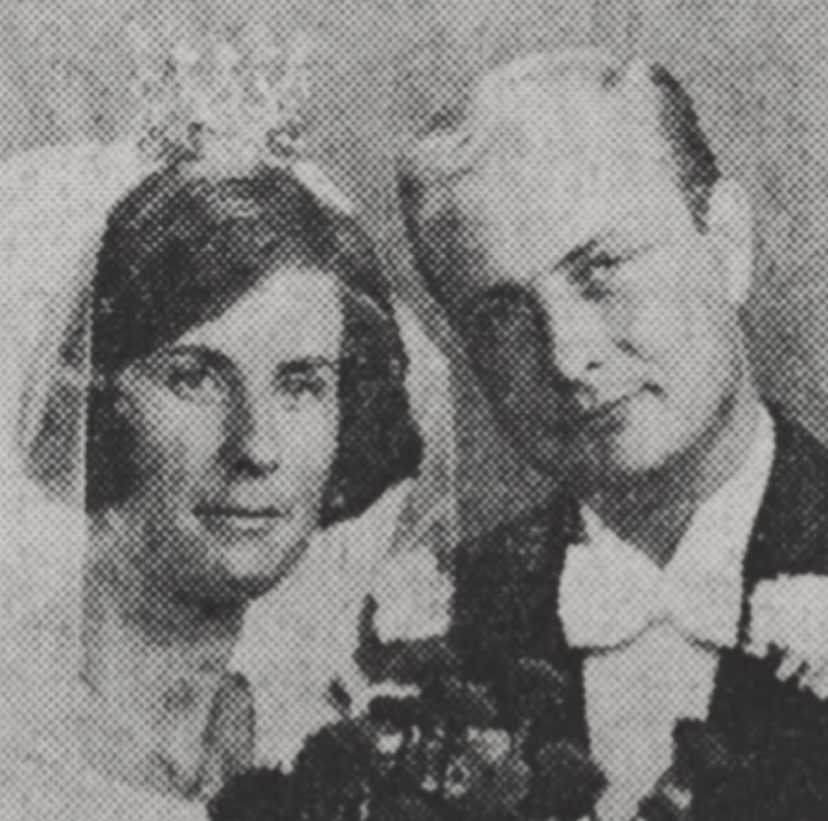
- Engström in 1968
- Born: Stig Folke Wilhelm Engström; 26 February 1934; Bombay, Bombay Presidency, British India
- Died: 26 June 2000 (aged 66); Täby, Sweden
- Other names: Skandiamannen ('The Skandia Man')
- Occupation: Graphic designer
- Known for: Potential suspect for the assassination of Olof Palme

Stig Folke Wilhelm Engström (26 February 1934 – 26 June 2000) was a Swedish graphic designer. Long treated by police as an eyewitness to the assassination of Prime Minister Olof Palme, Engström was separately proposed as Palme's assassin by the Swedish writers Lars Larsson and Thomas Pettersson.

Krister Petersson, prosecutor in charge of the investigation, announced the closing of the case at a press conference on 10 June 2020 and stated twenty years after Engström's death, he was the prime suspect in the murder, but that the evidence against him would have been too weak for a trial.

In line with Swedish media reporting practices of not disclosing the names of suspects, Engström was dubbed The Skandia Man (Swedish: Skandiamannen), since he had arrived at the crime scene from the nearby head office of the Skandia Insurance Company, where he worked. Since Petersson's announcement in 2020, Swedish media have referred to Engström by name.

At a 2025 press conference it was announced that Engström no longer was the main suspect of the assassination.

== Biography ==
Stig Engström was born in Bombay, Bombay Presidency, British India, on 26 February 1934 to affluent Swedish parents from Småland. His mother, Ruth Engström, was originally from Nybro. His father, Folke Engström, worked for the industrialist Ivar Kreuger.

In 1926, his father received the opportunity from his employer to move to India to start up production there. His younger brother was born in Calcutta in 1940 and died in 2018. His mother Ruth died on 2 December 2013 at the age of 111 years old.

She was the oldest living Swede at the time.

Engström returned to Sweden when he was twelve years old and lived with relatives of the family until his parents also returned a few years later. He attended the same elite school as Olof Palme, Sigtunaskolan Humanistiska Läroverket, though not at the same time. While Engström showed artistic and athletic talent, he did not excel academically and never graduated or went to university. Engström did his mandatory military service before he started his studies to become a graphic designer. For some time, he worked for the Swedish military procurement establishment in designing and illustrating field manuals. In the late 1960s, he was hired by Sveriges Radio and later by Skandia Insurance Company to do design work in Stockholm, a position which he held until his retirement.

Besides his work as a graphic designer, Engström was briefly associated with the Moderate Party in Täby, where he lived, which involved design, print work and advertising. He eventually left the Moderates because of a disagreement with his local party association, over a school closure.

Engström lived his whole adult life in Täby, with his closest friends being the man known as "Vapensamlaren" (the weapon collector) and his family. They lived about 500 metres from each other and would gather, together with others, to play bridge around once a week. The two couples' friendship ended during the late 90's.

Engström married in 1964 but later divorced. His second marriage lasted from 1968 to 1999. In June 2000, Engström died in his home at the age of 66, after taking painkillers and alcohol.

== Palme assassination ==
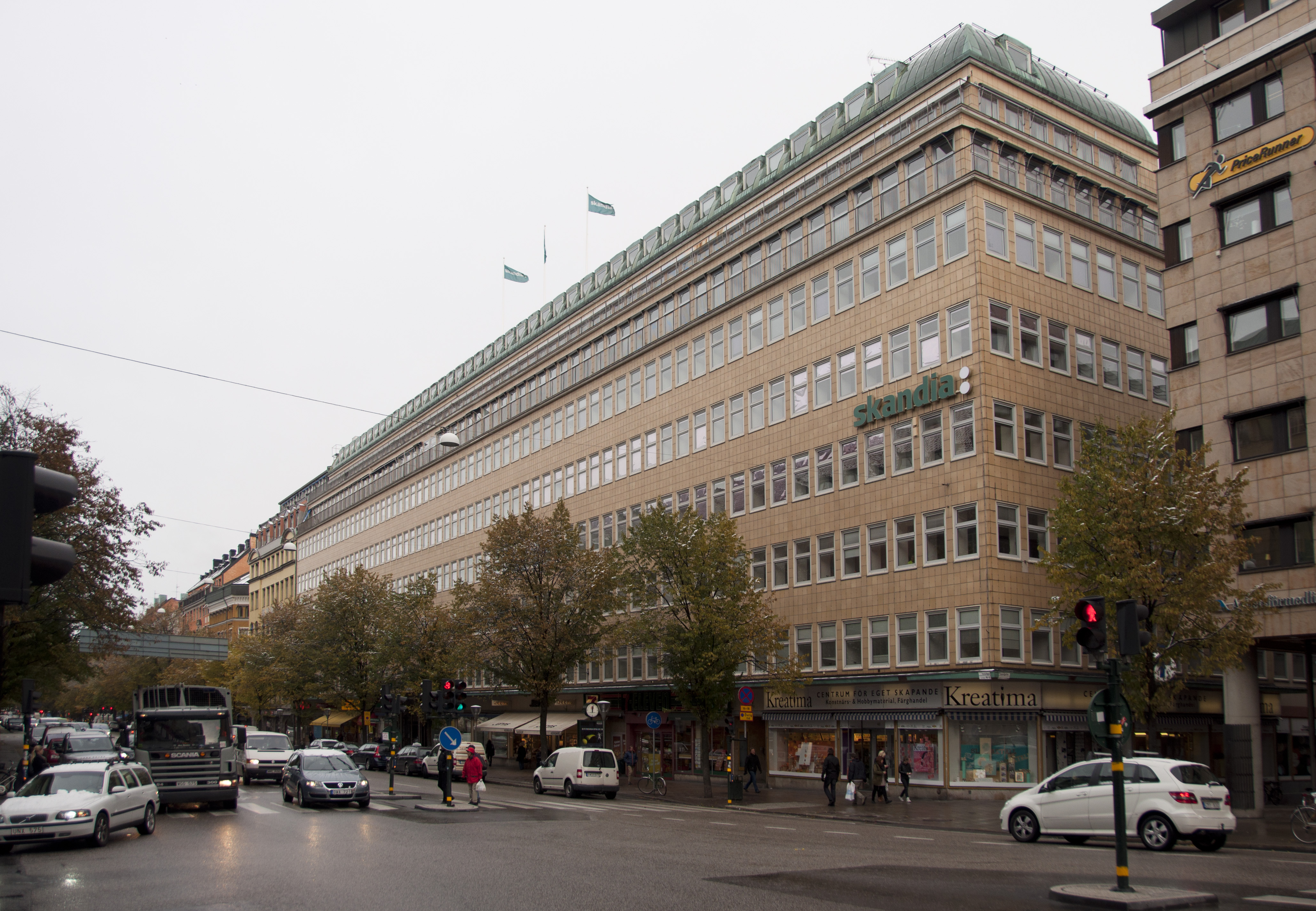
The Skandia Building (Skandiahuset), where Engström worked (2010 photo). Palme was shot at the corner, outside the Kreatima shop window. Engström had exited from the Skandia front lobby, midway up the building to the left. The killer escaped to the right, between the two buildings.

Engström was one of 20 people present at the scene when Swedish Prime Minister Palme was fatally shot with a .357 magnum revolver in central Stockholm on the evening of 28 February 1986. Witness testimony was vague and contradictory and described a man of medium height, wearing a dark coat or, according to a small minority of witnesses, a blue jacket, who may or may not have worn some form of headgear (witness testimony varied between no headgear, a rolled-up knitted cap, a hat or a cap that possibly had ear-flaps). The killer escaped on foot, and was likely spotted a couple hundred metres from the crime scene by a pair that described a man of uncertain appearance, in a dark coat and dark clothing, who was fidgeting with a small bag.

Engström had clocked out of work and chatted with security guards at the main entrance to the Skandia Insurance Company no more than one or two minutes before the shooting. On leaving the building, he was wearing a dark coat, a cap that possibly had ear flaps, a colorful scarf, glasses and carried a small bag. Some twenty minutes later, he returned to the building to tell the guards that Palme had been shot just forty metres from the lobby entrance. He is then believed to have gone home.

Police had failed to hold and question several key witnesses on the night of the murder, and some of them reported to authorities only after national television and radio had broadcast a police request for information on the killing. Engström said he had not been interviewed by the police at the scene although he approached an officer to give his story. The day after Palme's murder, Engström called a police hotline and stated that he had walked out of the Skandia gate around the time of the shooting and come upon Palme's dead body moments later, as one of the first few witnesses on the scene.

Over four police interrogations, the last of which was recorded, with the recording being released by court decision in January 2022, and in several media interviews, Engström maintained that he had participated in the rescue attempt in some fashion by helping to turn or reposition Palme's body. He said he had spoken a few words with Palme's wife, Lisbeth, and had pointed out the killer's escape route when police arrived. Engström had then dashed after police to hand them information he had learned from Palme's wife but aborted the run after realizing that they had moved away too far. He also said he had tried to report himself as a witness to police at the scene but had been brushed off.

However, no other witnesses clearly recalled Engström being at the crime scene, and his description of himself as an active or even leading figure in the events following the shooting was hard to reconcile with the testimony presented by other witnesses. A handful of the witnesses were questioned about whether they had seen Engström. Two responded that they had not, but two others said they had but only after initial hesitation and, in one case, after details were offered that also seemed to match another witness. Complicating matters, the fact that Engström had sought media attention after the event reduced the evidentiary value of witness recollections of his appearance because his face had become publicly known.

After briefly treating him as a person of interest, the police dismissed Engström as an unreliable witness and a publicity-seeker who was making a nuisance of himself. He no longer figured in the official investigation, which instead began to pursue a later-discredited lead about involvement by the Kurdistan Workers' Party.

== Quest for media attention ==
Engström had long been known to friends, colleagues, and family as an attention-seeking person with a taste for drama, and he had appeared a few times in the Swedish media before the assassination. In 1982, he was interviewed by Svenska Dagbladet about gender after a questionnaire-based survey had identified him as highly "androgynous". He stressed that he was a heterosexual and said that he considered himself to have both male and female personality traits.

After the assassination, Engström embarked on a quest for publicity by calling reporters and offering to tell his story already the day after the murder. He would appear in several Swedish media outlets to criticise the murder investigation and the Swedish police's lack of interest in his testimony. When investigators failed to invite Engström to the police reconstruction of the crime in April 1986, he contacted a television journalist and offered to dress up in the clothes that he had worn on the night of the murder and stage his own reconstruction. It was broadcast on Sveriges Television.

Engström's final interview about the case was in 1992 for the magazine Skydd & Säkerhet. Once again, Engström had contacted a friend who worked as a journalist for the magazine.

=== "Skandia Man" theories ===
The failure to solve Palme's assassination and repeated revelations of police misconduct made alternative theories about the murder begin to proliferate in the late 1980s and the 1990s. Private enthusiasts, journalists, and authors began to propose a variety of possible suspects, scenarios and conspiracy theories, ranging from the CIA, the KGB, or Apartheid South Africa being involved to a variety of lone gunmen theories, police conspiracies, connections to the Bofors arms scandal and other plots, some more credible than others. In the media emerged a cottage industry of so-called "privatspanare", a somewhat derogatory term for self-appointed investigators. Engström was initially of as little interest to the privatspanare or to the police, because the random nature of Palme's movement on the night of the murder seemed to preclude that Engström had timed his exit from the Skandia building to intercept Palme.

In the early 1990s, Olle Minell, a journalist for the communist magazine Proletären, depicted Engström as connected to a right-wing deep state intrigue against Palme. However, Minell argued that Engström might have been a part of the murder plot but did not believe that he was the actual shooter.

The theory that Engström was Palme's lone assassin was first brought up in Lars Larsson's book Nationens Fiende ("Enemy of the Nation") in 2016. The allegation later reappeared in an article by the journalist Thomas Pettersson in the magazine Filter in 2018, and in his book Den osannolika mördaren ("The Unlikely Murderer"), which was published the same year. Pettersson's book also broached theories that Palme had been shot by Swedish intelligence or on orders of the CIA, but it ended up agreeing with Larsson's depiction of Engström as having randomly met and shot Palme outside his office building.

According to Larsson and Pettersson's theories, which were developed separately but largely overlap, Engström had in fact arrived at the scene earlier than he admitted (which, according to Skandia's employee time clock, was quite possible) and spotted Palme only as he exited the building. Since for reasons unknown, Engström happened to be carrying a loaded gun, according to the theories, he decided to murder Palme. According to the Larsson-Pettersson argument, Engström then fled the area but counterintuitively almost immediately returned to the crime scene (Larsson) or straight to the Skandia building (Pettersson). By reporting himself to the police as a witness and approaching mass media with invented accounts based on elements gleaned from newspaper reporting, he aimed to muddle witness recollections and to confuse the police about his actual role. Both Larsson and Pettersson stressed that Engström had worn clothes that matched some of the witness descriptions of the murderer and pointed especially to the small bag noted by a witness who saw the escaping assassin.

Neither author presented any new testimony connecting Engström to the crime, but Pettersson interviewed Palme's son, Mårten Palme, who was cited as saying that his observation of a man who appeared to take an interest in his parents shortly before the shooting bore a resemblance to Engström. Critics of the Engström theory retorted that Mårten had previously identified Christer Pettersson as that man, and Pettersson and Engström bore little resemblance to each other. In a separate 2018 interview, another witness, Lars J, who saw the murderer escape, said that it was quite possible that Engström was the man he saw running from the scene of the crime; however, he had not seen the man's face.

Larsson's book drew little attention at the time of its publication, but Pettersson's made a major splash and drew some acclaim. However, the theory also met with opposition. Skeptics argued that the idea of Engström as a murderer was far-fetched in comparison with what they viewed as the more obvious alternative. Engström was simply a confused witness with a penchant for exaggerating his own importance, and Palme's murderer remained unknown.

In particular, family and friends of Engström almost universally rejected the idea that he could have been a murderer by arguing that he had no reason to kill Palme, had never owned a gun, had no known criminal or extremist connections and had no record of violence. Queried by investigators and by the press about the seeming discrepancies in Engström's witness testimony, they pointed to a history of attention-seeking, a taste for "drama", and a record of embellishing his own exploits to draw praise. "He was not a mythomaniac, but it was along those lines", a childhood friend told Expressen.

== Named as murder suspect ==
On 10 June 2020, Engström was announced as the prime suspect in Palme's murder at a press conference by the Swedish Prosecuting Authority's investigator, Krister Petersson. The prosecutor explicitly denied having relied on the books by Lars Larsson and Thomas Pettersson but presented a strikingly similar description of the case.

The investigators' case rested on the fact that Engström was known to have been on or near the scene of the crime but had not been reliably identified as present after the shooting by any other witness, his own account of events was deemed unreliable and his clothing bore a resemblance to that of the murderer. Petersson offered no motive for the killing, did not explain how or why Engström had acquired a gun or why he would have carried it when he left his office that night, and presented no witness identifying Engström as the perpetrator.

Although the prosecutor had claimed to have secured forensic evidence, he presented no such evidence at the press conference. It emerged that investigators had tracked down and test-fired a gun that had been owned by an acquaintance of Engström (a fact first revealed by author Thomas Pettersson), but the results were inconclusive. On the question of the weapon, Petersson simply stated that "considering what later transpires during the evening in question [i.e., that per Petersson's theory, Engström shot Palme], we state he must have had a gun". The only other forensic element of Petersson's investigation was the DNA testing of a series of mysterious letters that had claimed responsibility for the murder; however, test results had shown that they had likely not been written by Engström.

Petersson noted that the evidence against Engström would have been too circumstantial for a trial but said it would have been evidence enough to detain and question him if he had been alive. As Engström was dead, the Swedish police could not start a prosecution and so the investigation was closed 34 years after the murder.

== Reactions to naming ==
The prosecutor's announcement met with widespread criticism in Swedish media and from legal experts. Most critics focused on the absence of forensic evidence by charging that Petersson's case has been made up of speculation and circumstantial evidence. Some also questioned the legality or propriety of publicly naming Engström when even the prosecutor did not believe he had found evidence sufficient to convict him. Aftonbladet referred to the investigation's conclusion as "a total fiasco".

Leif G. W. Persson, a long-time watcher of the Palme investigation and an influential pundit on criminal justice issues, ridiculed Petersson's investigation as a "colossal disappointment" and said the case was so poorly constructed that it might legally constitute defamation of Engström. Defamation against deceased persons is possible in Sweden, although rare. Engström's family and friends were similarly critical.

Legal professionals, including the Swedish Bar Association, stated that a commission should be established to investigate Petersson's accusations since Engström, being dead, could not mount his own defense.

According to a public opinion poll commissioned by Svenska Dagbladet, 19% of the Swedes believed that Engström murdered Palme, but 62% stated that they were hesitant or did not know.

Petersson responded to his critics in Expressen: "We have done our best, and, according to us, the investigation that we're presenting is rather strong".

== 2025 press conference ==
At a press conference on 18 December 2025, director of public prosecutions Lennart Guné said it was wrong for investigators to name Stig Engström as the murderer, and that there wasn't enough evidence pointing towards Engström, so he would not be considered the main suspect any longer. It was also announced that the investigation in to the assassination of Olof Palme would remain closed.

== See also ==
- Christer Pettersson
- The Unlikely Murderer
