= Gösta Skoglund =

Swedish educator and politician (1903–1988)

Minister of Communications (Transport)
- In office April 1957 – September 1965
- Prime Minister: Tage Erlander
- Preceded by: Sture Henriksson
- Succeeded by: Olof Palme

Personal details
- Born: 29 April 1903 Hudiksvall, Sweden
- Died: 14 June 1988 (aged 85) Umeå, Sweden
- Party: Social Democratic Party

Gösta Skoglund (29 April 1903 – 14 June 1988) was a Swedish social democrat politician who was the minister of communications between 1957 and 1965. He was also known for his contributions in the establishment of Umeå University.

== Biography ==
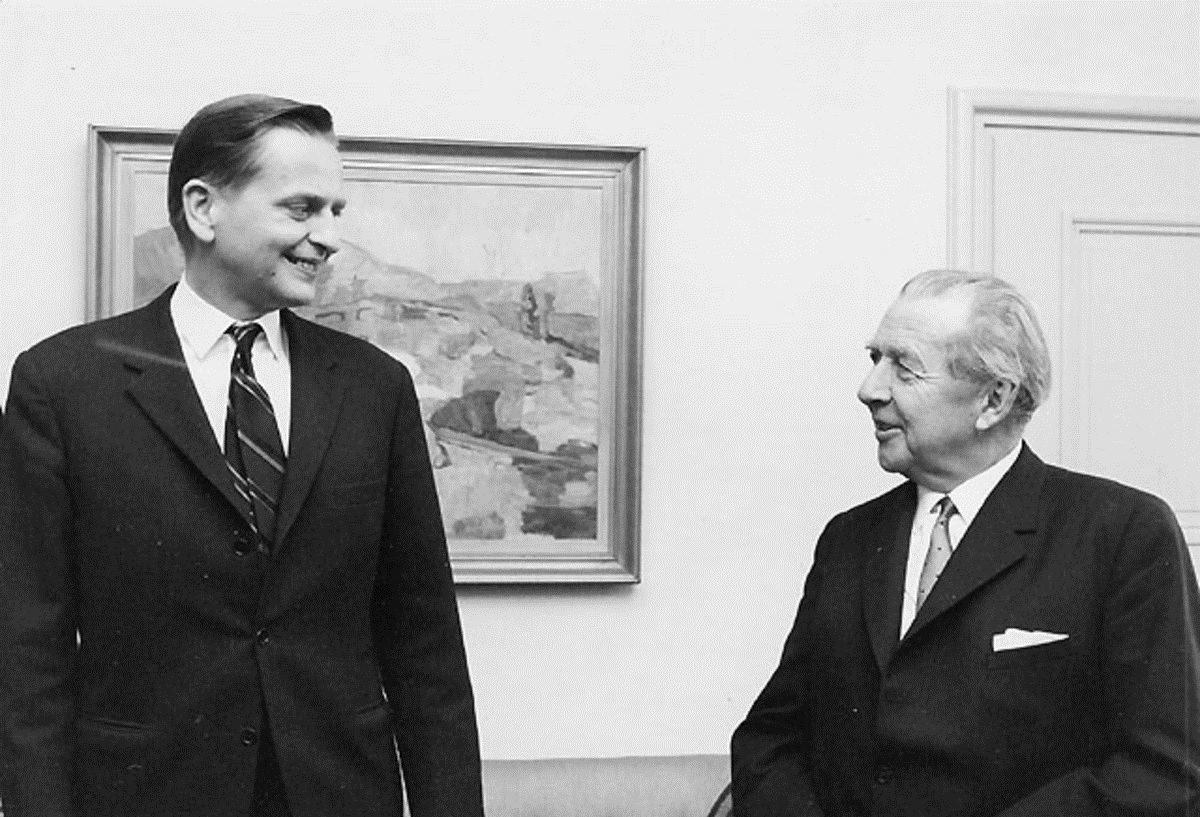
Gösta Skoglund and his successor as Minister of Communications (Transport) Olof Palme on 25 November 1965

Skoglund was born in Hudiksvall, Gävleborg County, on 29 April 1903. He received a degree in primary school education in 1925 after which he moved to Umeå where he began to work as a teacher in 1927. Skoglund started his political career in 1938 when he became a county councilor in Västerbotten and later a member of parliament where he served between 1940 and 1970. In April 1957 Skoglund was appointed minister of communications (Transport) to the cabinet led by social democrat Prime Minister Tage Erlander.

During his term as minister Skoglund initiated the traffic reform in Sweden in 1963. He was also a member of the Nordic Council. His term as the minister of communications (Transport) ended in September 1965, and he was succeeded by Olof Palme in the post.

Skoglund was made the head of Commission for High Level Road Planning in 1965. He served as chairman of the county council for two years from 1971 to 1973. He was one of the driving forces behind the formation of Umeå University.

He died in Umeå on 14 June 1988.

== Honors and legacy ==
Umeå University made Skoglund honorary doctor of the faculty of dentistry in 1958, which was before the official inauguration of the university, and of the faculty of medicine in 1972.

In 1982 a road at the Umeå University campus was named after him. In 1983 a scholarship fund was established in his memory at the Center for Regional Science (CERUM) at Umeå University which provides scholarships every year.
