= Acarnanian Mountains =

Mountain range in Greece

- Akarnanika
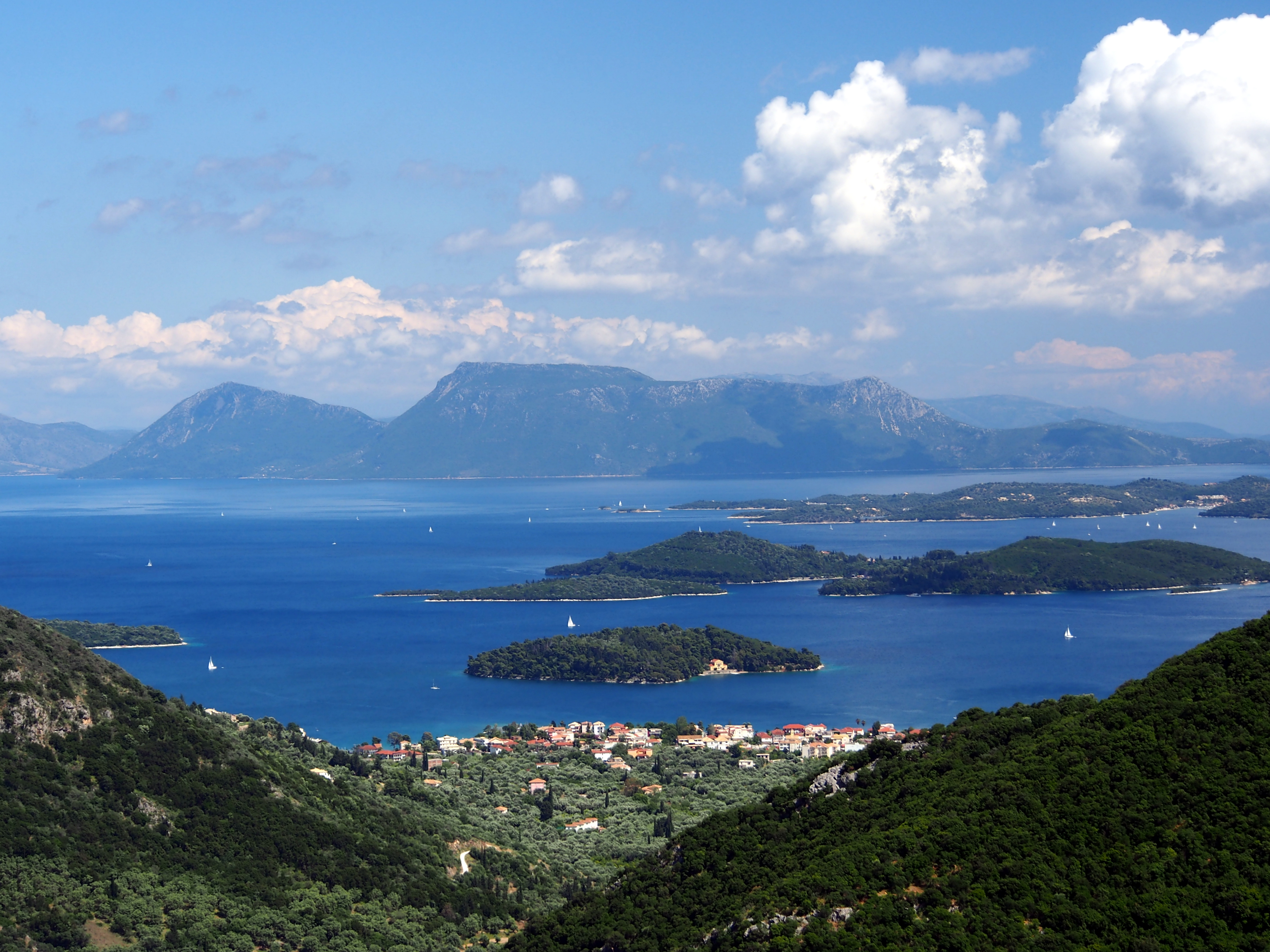
- Aitolia-Akarnania coast and Akarnaniká mountains (in the background) seen from Lefkas.

Highest point
- Peak: Psili Koryfi
- Elevation: 1,589 m (5,213 ft)
- Coordinates: 38°45′29″N 20°59′38″E

Dimensions
- Length: 40 km (25 mi) N-S

Geography
- Country: Greece
- Regional unit: Aetolia-Acarnania

The Acarnanian Mountains (Greek: Ακαρνανικά όρη, Akarnanika ori) is a mountain range in the northwestern part of the Aetolia-Acarnania regional unit in western Greece. It stretches from the village Monastiraki, near Vonitsa, in the north to Astakos in the south, with a total length of nearly 40 km. The Ionian Sea lies to the west.

== Peaks ==
The mountains are composed of limestone and are generally barren with the exception of the northern faces. The highest peak is Psili Koryfi (Greek: Ψηλή Κορυφή 'high peak') at 1589 meters. Directly to the southeast of Psili Koryfi is Boumistos mountain which stands at 1573 meters. Boumistos received its name because of the many lightning strikes that land near the summit. To the west of Boumistos and Psili Korfi is Misovouni which stands at 1338 meters. To the west of Misovouni is Serekas mountain which towers 1171 meters above the Ionian Sea. On the western foothills of Serekas is the convent of Agios Dimitrios which is run by a few nuns. To the north of Psili Koryfi is Perganti mountain which has a height of 1428 meters. On the summit of Perganti is a radio tower facility which services the region surrounding the Ambracian Gulf. The northernmost rampart of the range is Agriovouni which stands at 563.5 meters.

== Nature ==
The Acarnanian Mountains harbour several different plant species such as the oak tree (quercus) and Abies cephalonica. They also form an important area for the conservation of raptors and eagles.

== Weather ==
The mountains enjoy a wide variety of weather depending on the season. In the summer temperatures can be quite hot as the surrounding region can reach up to 90 °F (32 °C). In the higher elevations, summertime temperatures can drop into the 50s (°F) during the day and even cooler at night. Autumn sees even cooler temperatures with heavy rainfall as the area receives over 40 inches (1,000 mm) of rain per year. Winter can be cold with snow falling on the higher elevations as early as November and as late as April. January and February are the coldest months with snow falling in the villages that surround the range that are as low as 250 meters. At the village of Monastiraki January temperatures are below freezing on several nights. The highest summits can receive up to 3 feet (0.91 m) of snow in a strong winter storm. Spring time weather is pleasant with the occasional cold spell coming from the northeast.

== Settlements ==
The main villages on the Acarnanian Mountains are Monastiraki in the north, Palairos in the northwest, Kandila in the west, Astakos in the south and Katouna in the east. The spring water Korpi is bottled on the northern end of the mountains.
