= Joakim Palme =

Swedish political scientist and sociologist (born 1958)

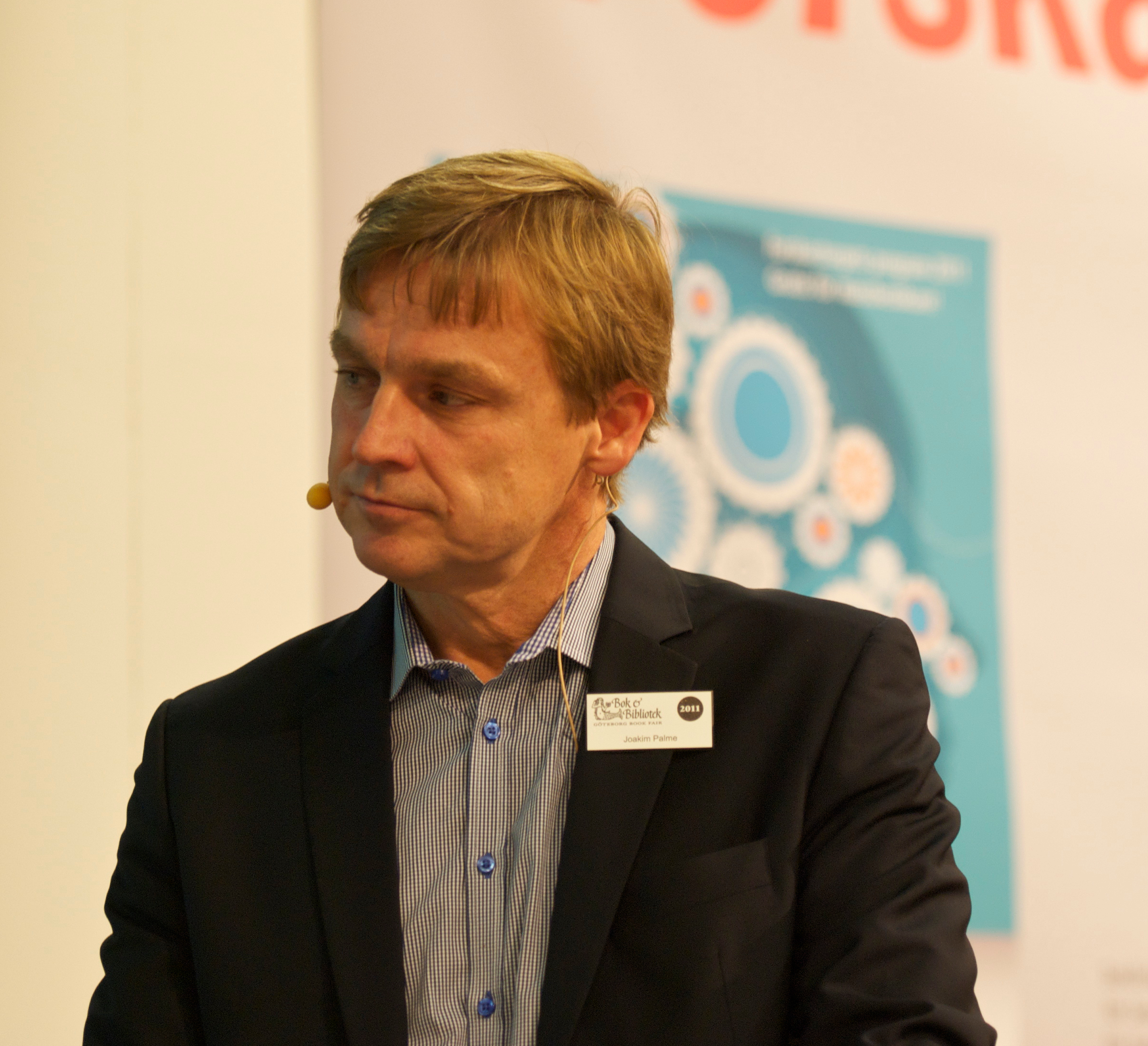
- Palme at the 2011 Göteborg Book Fair
- Born: Per Joakim Palme; 18 May 1958 (age 68); Stockholm, Sweden
- Occupations: Political scientist, sociologist
- Children: 3
- Parents: Olof Palme (father); Lisbeth Palme (mother)
- Relatives: Mårten Palme (brother)

Per Joakim Palme (born 18 May 1958) is a Swedish political scientist and sociologist. He is the eldest son of Olof Palme, who was Prime Minister of Sweden until his assassination in 1986, and his wife Lisbeth Palme.

== Career ==
Since 2009, Palme is a professor of political science at Uppsala University. Since 2002 he has been CEO of the Institute for Future Studies. Between 2003 and 2009, he was adjunct professor of sociology at Stockholm University. In 2009 he was appointed adjunct professor at the Center for Velfærdsstatsforskning at the University of Southern Denmark.

== See also ==
- Walter Korpi
