= Christer Pettersson =

Swedish criminal (1947–2004)

- Police photo of Christer Pettersson
- Born: Carl Gustaf Christer Pettersson; 23 April 1947; Solna, Stockholm, Sweden
- Died: 29 September 2004 (aged 57); Solna, Stockholm, Sweden
- Education: Calle Flygare Theatrical School
- Known for: Suspect in the assassination of Olof Palme
- Capture status: Deceased

Details
- Date: 20 December 1970
- Country: Sweden
- Location: Stockholm
- Killed: 1 confirmed 1 suspected (Palme)

Carl Gustaf Christer Pettersson (23 April 1947 – 29 September 2004) was a Swedish criminal who was a suspect in the 1986 assassination of Olof Palme, the Prime Minister of Sweden. In 1989 he was convicted of the murder in district court but acquitted on appeal the following year.

== Life ==
Pettersson was born on 23 April 1947 in Solna Parish in Solna, Sweden, to Roland Pettersson (1916–1977) and Inga Maria Hansson (1918–1973) and grew up in a middle-class family in Solna outside of Stockholm and later moved to the suburb of Sollentuna. In his youth, he attended Calle Flygare Theatrical School, where he was considered to be promising by at least one of his teachers. However, Pettersson suffered a head injury from which he would never fully recover. Petterson then began a period of substance abuse, which would eventually force him to drop out of school.

In 1970, he stabbed a man to death in central Stockholm, during a street brawl in what the Swedish press dubbed the "bayonet murder". The killing took place just around the corner from what would later be the site of the Palme assassination. Pettersson was sentenced to closed psychiatric care for manslaughter for the killing. After less than two years he was released and continued a life of petty crime, which financed his alcohol and drug abuse.

=== Tried for murder of Olof Palme ===
On the night of 28 February 1986, Swedish Prime Minister Olof Palme, a Social Democrat, was shot and killed in Stockholm as he walked home from a cinema with his wife, Lisbet Palme. The killer quickly escaped and left no traces except two .357-caliber Magnum bullets. Witness statements about his appearance were confused and contradictory.

In 1988, Pettersson was detained and accused of Palme's murder after an investigation, which appeared to have started based on rumors about his involvement among fellow small-time criminals and drug addicts. The initial investigation had uncovered little of significance, but once detained, Pettersson was picked out from a ten-person police lineup by Lisbet Palme.

Pettersson denied any involvement and claimed he had liked Palme and had left central Stockholm at the time of the murder.

However, Lisbet Palme's identification, combined with statements by acquaintances of Pettersson, who stated that he had been near the scene of the crime at the night of the murder, led to a 1989 conviction for murder. Pettersson was sentenced to life imprisonment.

Just a few months later, however, Pettersson was freed on appeal. The court cited a lack of evidence, including the missing murder weapon, and raised questions over the reliability of Lisbet Palme's identification. Pettersson was awarded SEK 300,000 (roughly $50,000) in compensation.

Although Pettersson appears to have quickly spent the money on alcohol and drugs, he remained in the media spotlight and then raised his income by selling TV and newspaper interviews. In several interviews, particularly on TV3, Pettersson was encouraged to admit to killing Olof Palme. In such situations, he repeatedly engaged in what-if scenarios that came close to an admission of guilt. However, his confession was not treated seriously, and when cornered, he argued that he had simply come seeking money for yet another television appearance.

Police investigators continued to investigate Pettersson, with many reportedly feeling that he had got off on a technicality and was in fact guilty. In 1998, the Swedish Supreme Court rejected a prosecutor's appeal to retry Pettersson by citing that the new evidence put before it was "not of such nature that a new trial can be granted in the case."

In June 2020, the Swedish Prosecution Authority announced their conclusion that Stig Engström was the killer, although he would not be prosecuted as he had been dead for 20 years. The report made no mention of Pettersson, whose acquittal in 1989 meant he could not be seriously investigated any further without new evidence. The conclusion was widely criticised and many felt it was based on little to no actual evidence.

=== Coma and death ===
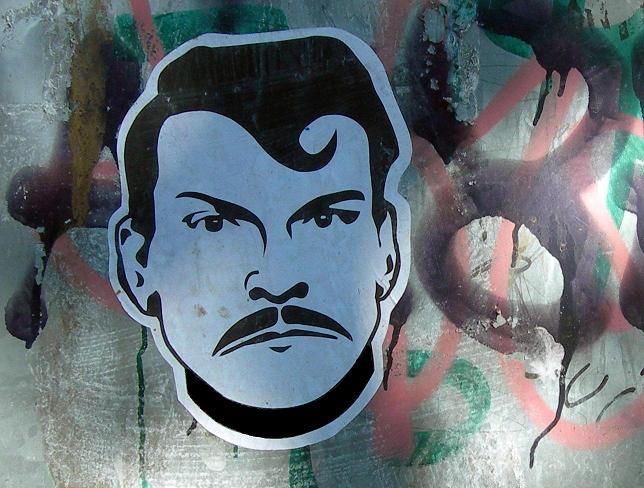
Pettersson depicted in street art

After a brawl with police, Pettersson was admitted to hospital on 15 September 2004. On leaving hospital the following day, he reportedly fell and suffered a cerebral haemorrhage and went into a coma. Pettersson died at Karolinska University Hospital on 29 September 2004, at the age of 57.

Pettersson was buried in Sollentuna on 20 January 2005.

== See also ==
- Stig Engström

== Literature ==
- John Douglas-Gray thriller, The Novak Legacy (ISBN 978-0-7552-1321-4)
