= Nguyễn Thọ Chân =

Vietnamese politician (1922–2023)

Minister of Labor
- In office 26 April 1974 – 19 February 1981
- Prime Minister: Phạm Văn Đồng
- Preceded by: Nguyễn Hữu Khiếu
- Succeeded by: Đào Thiện Thi

Personal details
- Born: 20 August 1922 Thanh Trì district, Hanoi, French Indochina
- Died: 6 January 2023 (aged 100) Tân Bình district, Ho Chi Minh City, Vietnam
- Party: CPV

Nguyễn Thọ Chân (20 August 1922 – 6 January 2023) was a Vietnamese politician. A member of the Communist Party, he served as Minister of Labor from 1974 to 1981.

Nguyễn died in Ho Chi Minh City on 6 January 2023, at the age of 100.
