= Walter Korpi =

Swedish sociologist (1934–2024)

Walter Korpi (20 February 1934 – 19 November 2024) was a Swedish sociologist.

Korpi was a pioneer of power resource theory. Together with the Swedish politician and sociologist Joakim Palme, he wrote the work "The Paradox of Redistribution and Strategies of Equality", which has some detractors about its principles.

He was the brother of Sture Korpi.

== Academic and professional career ==
He entered Stockholm University in 1958 and received a degree in philosophy from Stockholm University four years later. He also studied at the University of Colorado Boulder between 1955 and 1956. From 1959 to 1964 he worked as a sociologist at the Institute of Military Psychology (Militärpsykologiska institutet) and from 1965 to 1966 at the Swedish Metalworkers Union. He then worked as an associate professor in the Department of Sociology at Stockholm University (1966–1968). He then worked as a professor of sociology at Umeå University until 1969 until he returned to the previous university as a professor of sociology until 1972. Since 1972 and until his retirement he was professor of social policy.

At the beginning, in the 1960s, when Korpi was at the Institute of Military Psychology, he focused primarily on attitudes and well-being in the military. Notable is the publication Social Pressures and Attitudes in Military Training, the thesis with which he presented himself when he graduated in 1962 in sociology. From the 1970s onwards, he focused largely on labour disputes and class struggle, and to a lesser extent on health care research.

== Publications ==
- The Paradox of Redistribution and Strategies of Equality: Welfare State Institutions, Inequality and Poverty in the Western Countries "(with Joakim Palme). American Sociological Review, 63 (661–687), 1998
- The Working Class in Welfare Capitalism. Work, Unions and Politics in Sweden. London: Routledge & Kegan Paul, 1978.
- Korpi, W. (1980) 'Social Policy and Distributional Conflict in the Capitalist Democracies. A Preliminary Comparative Framework ', West European Politics, Vol. 3, No. 3, pp. 296–316.
- The democratic class struggle. London: Routledge & Kegan Paul, 1983

== Awards ==
Some of the most outstanding awards or recognitions:

- 1978 C. Wright Mills Award for The Working Class in Welfare Capitalism: Work, Unions and Politics in Sweden
- 1990 Statistical Award from the Swedish Statistical Association for the article Sweden is left behind? The economic growth of Suencia 1820-1990 in a comparative perspective. (originally, in Swedish; Halkar Sverige efter? Sveriges ekonomiska tillväxt 18201990 and jämförande belysning
- Doctor Honoris Causa 2000 from the Faculty of Social Sciences of the University of Turku, Finland .
