= Tunnelgatan =

Street in central Stockholm, Sweden

Coordinates: 59°20.207′N 18°03.803′E

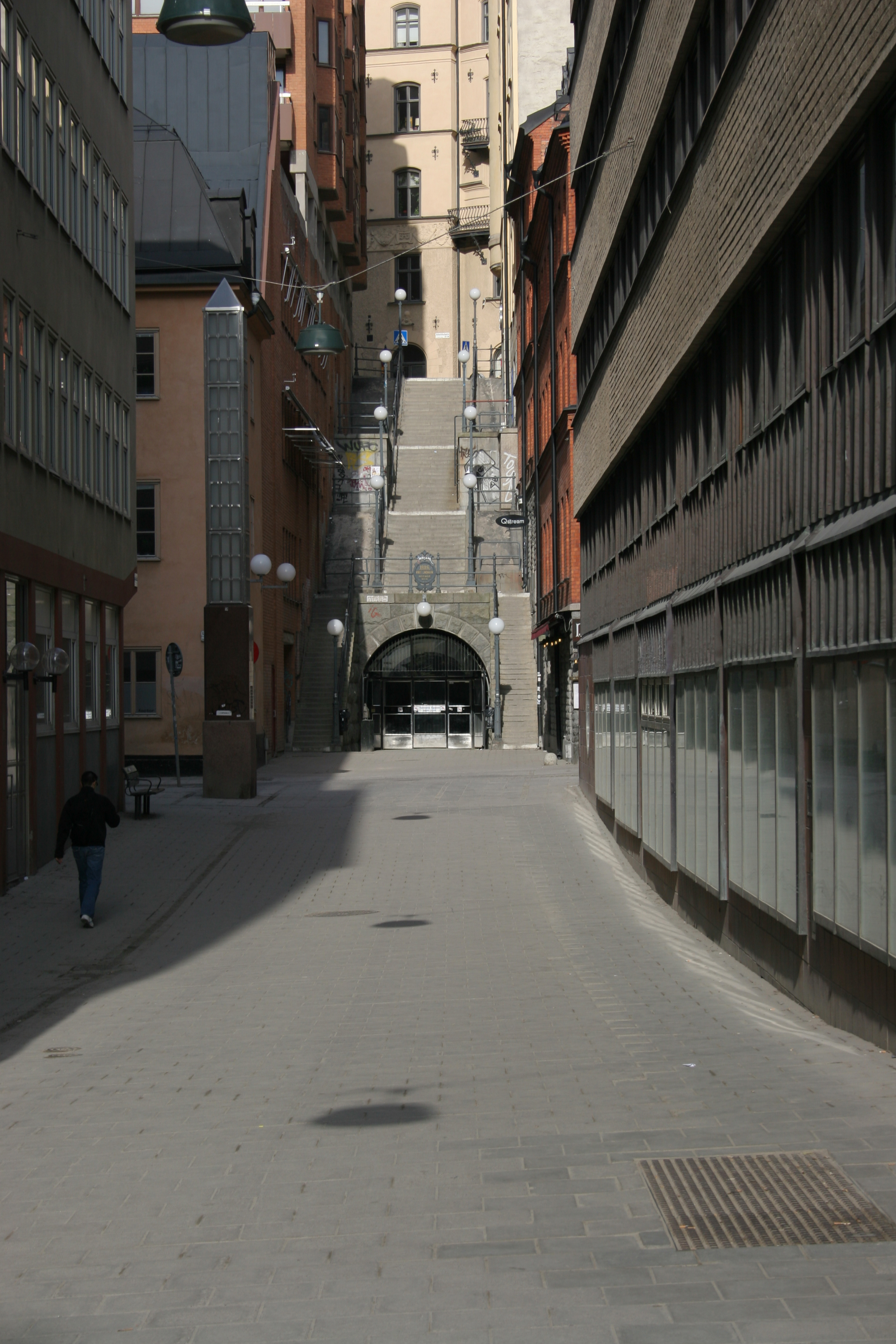
Section of Tunnelgatan in April 2005 showing the escape route of Prime Minister Olof Palme's assassin

Tunnelgatan (Tunnel Street) is a street in Stockholm, Sweden, which stretches from Sveavägen to the Brunkeberg Tunnel.

Tunnelgatan was named after the Brunkeberg tunnel which opened in 1886. The previous name was Barnhus trädgårdsgata (Orphanage garden street), after the orphanage at Norra Bantorget. During the 17th century, there was a ropewalk at the place. The only remaining residential building in the street is located at the crossing of Tunnelgatan and Luntmakargatan and was built between 1894 and 1896.

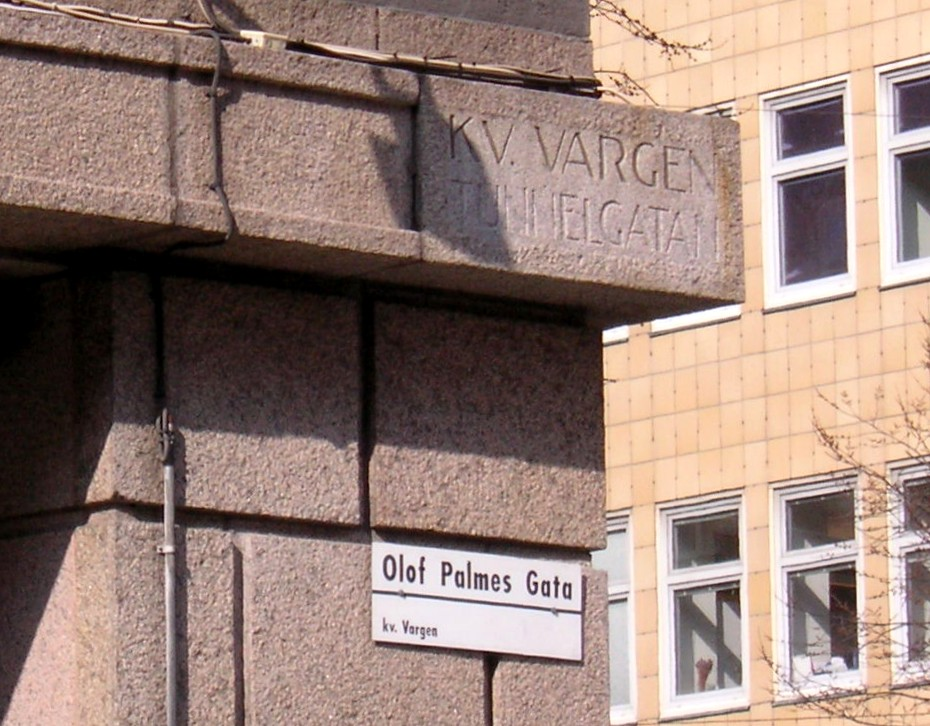
Section of Tunnelgatan that has been renamed Olof Palme Street in memory of the assassination of Olof Palme

Tunnelgatan is associated with the murder of Olof Palme, which occurred near the tunnel mouth on Sveavägen street, and the killer fled up the stairs. A section of the street has since been renamed as Olof Palmes gata.

The City Plan 67 intended to expand Tunnelgatan to a six-lane urban highway with continuation through David Bagares gata to Stureplan, and further through Humlegårdsgatan to Norra Djurgården. In the west, a connection to Klarastrandsleden via a bridge over the tracks north of Stockholm Central Station was planned. However the plans were shelved indefinitely when the 1977 City Plan was formulated.

== See also ==
- Geography of Stockholm

== Literature ==
- City 67: Stockholm: principplan för den fortsatta citysaneringen framlagd i maj 1967 (in Swedish). [Stockholm]: [Nord. bokh. (distr.)]. 1967. LIBRIS 479017.
- Westlund Börje, Stahre Nils-Gustaf, ed. (1986). Stockholms gatunamn: innerstaden (in Swedish) (1. uppl. ed.). Stockholm: Liber/Allmänna förl. ISBN 91-38-90777-1. LIBRIS 7269073.
