= Lagercrantz family =

Swedish noble family

Lagercrantz
- Swedish noble family
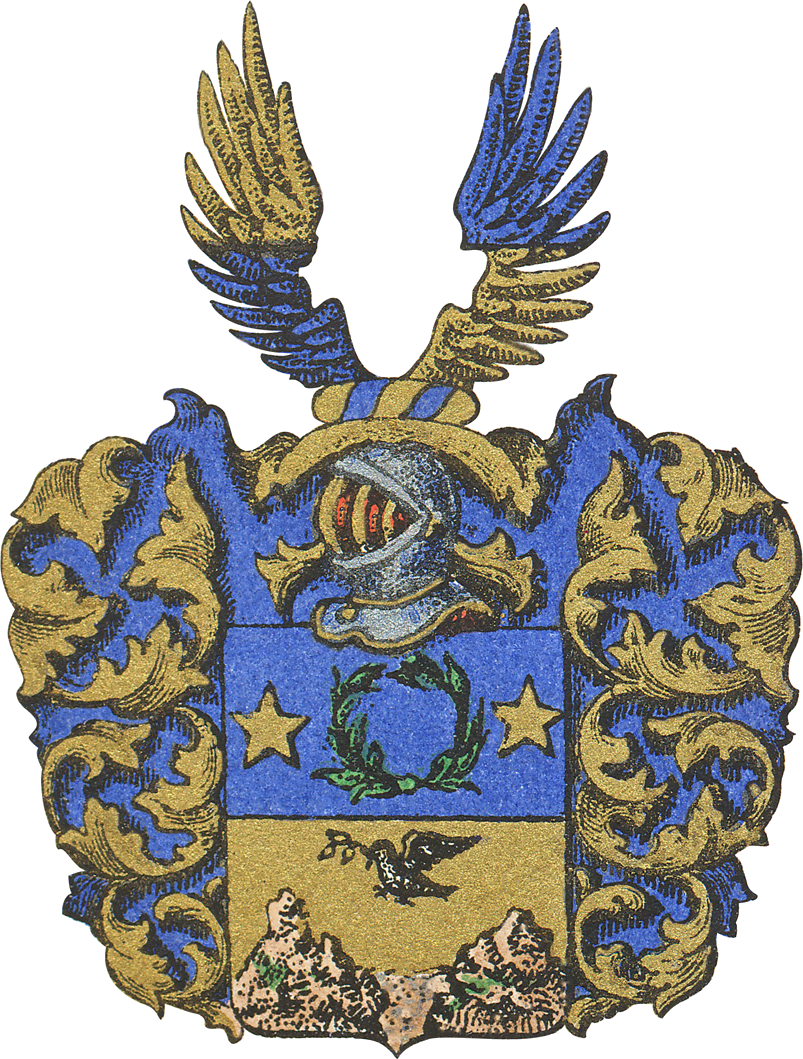
- Coat of arms of the House of von Düben
- Country: Sweden
- Origin: Gävle

The Lagercrantz family is a Swedish noble family, introduced at the Swedish house of nobility in 1682. The oldest known ancestor of the Lagercranz family was Jacob Larsson Gavelius (died 1656), an assessor at the Göta Court of Appeal.

== List of people ==
- Hugo Lagercrantz (born 1945), Swedish paediatrician
- Olof Lagercrantz (1911–2002), Swedish writer
- David Lagercrantz (born 1962), Swedish writer
- Marika Lagercrantz (born 1954), Swedish actress
