= Sture Korpi =

Swedish politician (1939–2017)

Sture Korpi (16 November 1939 – 12 March 2017) was a Swedish politician, member of Swedish Social Democratic Party, who was a secretary of state at the Ministry of Health and Social Affairs between 1982 and 1991.

Korpi worked as a social secretary in Stockholm and was the information secretary to Minister of Social Affairs Sven Aspling in 1965–1976, and the head of department at the Swedish Social Insurance Agency in 1976–1982. In 1982–1991, he was the state secretary in the Ministry of Social Affairs. From 1993 to 2004, he was director general of the Norwegian Institutions Board.

Korpi is buried at the Northern Cemetery outside Stockholm. He was the brother of Walter Korpi.

== Bibliography ==
- Korpi, Sture (1970). Låt oss slippa insamlingar!. Tidskrift för allmän försäkring, 99-0436700-0; 1970:11. Stockholm.
- Korpi Sture, red (1971). Socialpolitiken under 50 år: Socialdepartementet 1920-1970. Stockholm.
- Korpi, Sture (2007-01-01). SOU 2007:2 Från socialbidrag till arbete. Regeringskansliet, Socialdepartementet. SOU 2007:2. ISBN 978-91-38-22682-7.
