= Olof Palme =

Prime Minister of Sweden (1969–1976; 1982–1986)

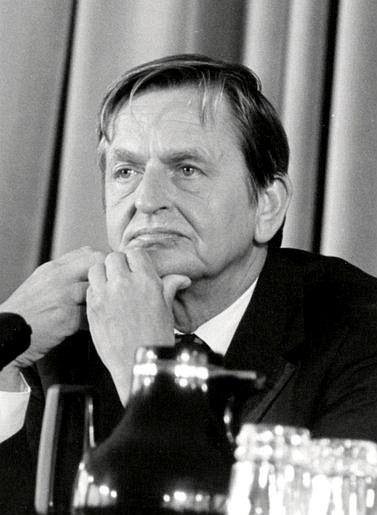
- Palme in 1984

Prime Minister of Sweden
- In office 8 October 1982 – 28 February 1986
- Monarch: Carl XVI Gustaf
- Deputy: Ingvar Carlsson
- Preceded by: Thorbjörn Fälldin
- Succeeded by: Ingvar Carlsson
- In office 14 October 1969 – 8 October 1976
- Monarchs: Gustaf VI Adolf (1969–1973); Carl XVI Gustaf (1973–1976)
- Preceded by: Tage Erlander
- Succeeded by: Thorbjörn Fälldin

Chairman of the Social Democratic Party
- In office 14 October 1969 – 28 February 1986
- Preceded by: Tage Erlander
- Succeeded by: Ingvar Carlsson

Leader of the Opposition
- In office 8 October 1976 – 8 October 1982
- Monarch: Carl XVI Gustaf
- Prime Minister: Thorbjörn Fälldin (1976–1978, 1979–1982); Ola Ullsten (1978–1979)
- Preceded by: Thorbjörn Fälldin
- Succeeded by: Ulf Adelsohn

President of the Nordic Council
- In office 1 January 1979 – 31 December 1979
- Preceded by: Trygve Bratteli
- Succeeded by: Matthías Árni Mathiesen
Positions held in the Erlander cabinets
Minister of Education
In office 1 January 1968 – 14 October 1969
Prime Minister	Tage Erlander
Preceded by	Himself (as Minister of Education and Ecclesiastical Affairs)
Succeeded by	Ingvar Carlsson
Minister of Education and Ecclesiastical Affairs
In office 29 September 1967 – 31 December 1967
Prime Minister	Tage Erlander
Preceded by	Ragnar Edenman
Succeeded by	Himself (as Minister of Education)
Minister of Communications
In office 25 November 1965 – 29 September 1967
Prime Minister	Tage Erlander
Preceded by	Gösta Skoglund
Succeeded by	Svante Lundkvist

Personal details
- Born: Sven Olof Joachim Palme; 30 January 1927 Stockholm, Sweden
- Died: 28 February 1986 (aged 59) Stockholm, Sweden
- Cause of death: Assassination by gunshot
- Resting place: Adolf Fredrik Church
- Party: Social Democratic
- Spouses: Jelena Rennerova (m. 1948; div. 1952) Lisbeth Beck-Friis (m. 1956)
- Children: Joakim; Mårten; Mattias
- Relatives: Rajani Palme Dutt (first-cousin, once removed)
- Education: Kenyon College (BA); Stockholm University (LLM)
- Cabinet: I; II
- Website: Olof Palme International Center

Military service
- Allegiance: Sweden
- Branch/service: Swedish Army
- Years of service: 1945–1947 (active); 1947–1977 (reserve)
- Rank: Captain
- Unit: Svea Artillery Regiment

Sven Olof Joachim Palme (/ˈpɑːlmə/; Swedish: [ˈûːlɔf ˈpâlːmɛ]; 30 January 1927 – 28 February 1986) was a Swedish politician and statesman who served as Prime Minister of Sweden from 1969 to 1976 and 1982 to 1986. Palme led the Swedish Social Democratic Party from 1969 until his assassination in 1986.

A longtime protégé of Prime Minister Tage Erlander, he became Prime Minister of Sweden and Chairman of the Social Democratic Party in 1969. He left office after failing to form a government after the 1976 general election, which ended 40 years of unbroken rule by the Social Democratic Party. While he served as a Leader of the Opposition, he also served as special mediator of the United Nations in the Iran–Iraq War, and was President of the Nordic Council in 1979. He faced a second defeat in 1979, but he returned as prime minister after electoral victories in 1982 and 1985, and served until his death.

Palme was a pivotal and polarizing figure domestically as well as in international politics from the 1960s onward. Domestically, Palme pursued a left-wing and social democratic agenda for the country, including switching to unicameralism in the constitution, expanding the welfare state, advocating for womens' rights, and pushing for nuclear power, although his last term was more moderate due to Sweden's economic troubles. Many of his economic views were opposed by Sweden's business community. Materially, his reforms resulted in a reduction in infant mortality, an increase in the basic old-age pension replacement rate, and an increase in minimum replacement rate in healthcare earnings, among other improvements.

He followed a policy of non-alignment towards the superpowers, frequently criticising both Soviet and American foreign policy. He supported numerous liberation movements and Third World governments. He was the first Western head of government to visit communist Cuba after its revolution. He publicly opposed numerous authoritarian regimes, including those of Francisco Franco of Spain, Augusto Pinochet of Chile, Leonid Brezhnev of the Soviet Union, António de Oliveira Salazar of Portugal, Gustáv Husák of Czechoslovakia, and South Africa's apartheid system. His 1972 condemnation of American bombings in Hanoi resulted in a temporary freeze in Sweden–United States relations.

Palme's assassination on a Stockholm street on 28 February 1986 was the first murder of a national leader in Sweden since Gustav III in 1792, and had a great impact across Scandinavia. Local convict and addict Christer Pettersson was originally convicted of the murder in Stockholm District Court but was unanimously acquitted by the Svea Court of Appeal. On 10 June 2020, Swedish prosecutors announced that there was "reasonable evidence" that Stig Engström had killed Palme. As Engström had killed himself in 2000, the authorities announced that the investigation into Palme's death was to be closed. The 2020 conclusion has faced widespread criticism from lawyers, police officers and journalists, decrying the evidence as only circumstantial, and – by the prosecutors' own admission – too weak to ensure a trial had the suspect been alive. The true identity of his assassin remains unknown.

== Early life ==
Sven Olof Joachim Palme was born on 30 January 1927 into an upper class, conservative Lutheran family in the Östermalm district of Stockholm. He grew up in the building on Östermalmsgatan 36 which in 1970 was converted into the Embassy of Romania.

The progenitor of the Palme family was skipper Palme Lydert of Ystad of either Dutch or German ancestry. His sons adopted the surname Palme. Many of the early Palmes were vicars and judges in Scania. One branch of the family, of which Olof Palme was part, and which became more affluent, relocated to Kalmar; that branch is related to several other prominent Swedish families such as the Kreugers, von Sydows and the Wallenbergs. His father, Gunnar Palme (1886–1934), was a businessman, son of Sven Theodor Palme (1854–1934) and Swedish-speaking Finnish Baroness Hanna Palme, née von Born (1861–1959). Through her, Olof Palme claimed ancestry from King Johan III of Sweden, his father King Gustav Vasa of Sweden and King Frederick I of Denmark and Norway. His mother, Elisabeth von Knieriem (1890–1972), of the Knieriem family who originated from Quedlinburg, descended from Baltic German burghers and clergy and had arrived in Sweden from Russia as a refugee in 1915. Elisabeth's great-great-great grandfather Johann Melchior von Knieriem (1758–1817) had been ennobled by the Emperor Alexander I of Russia in 1814. The von Knieriem family does not count as members of any of the Baltic knighthoods. Palme's father died when he was seven years old. Despite his background, his political orientation came to be influenced by Social Democratic attitudes. His travels in the Third World, as well as the United States, where he saw deep economic inequality and racial segregation, helped to develop these views.

A sickly child, Olof Palme received his education from private tutors. Even as a child he gained knowledge of two foreign languages — German and English. He studied at Sigtunaskolan Humanistiska Läroverket, one of Sweden's few residential high schools, and passed the university entrance examination with high marks at the age of 17. He was called up into the Army in January 1945 and did his compulsory military service at Svea Artillery Regiment between 1945 and 1947, becoming in 1956 a reserve officer with the rank of Captain in the Artillery. After he was discharged from military service in March 1947, he enrolled at Stockholm University.

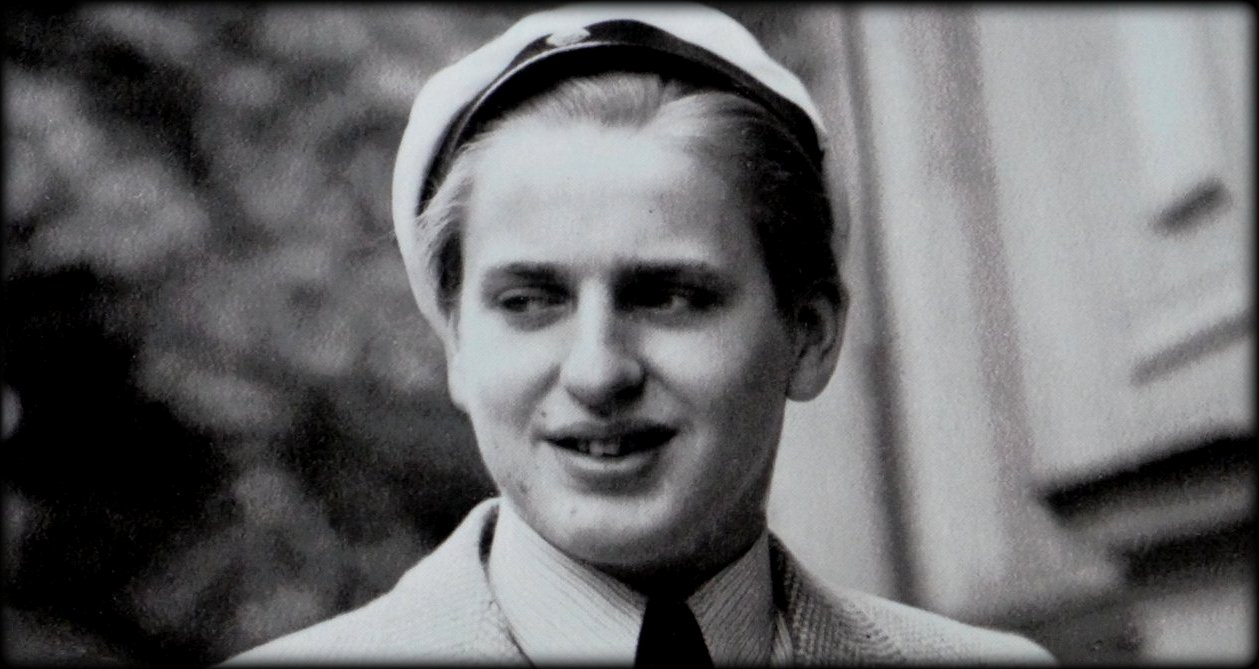
Palme as a student in 1944

On a scholarship, he studied at Kenyon College, a small liberal arts school in central Ohio from 1947 to 1948, graduating with a Bachelor of Arts degree; extensive academic credit from Sweden enabled him to finish at Kenyon in such a short time. Inspired by radical debate in the student community, he wrote a critical essay on Friedrich Hayek's The Road to Serfdom. Palme wrote his senior honour thesis on the United Auto Workers union, led at the time by Walter Reuther. After graduation, he traveled throughout the country and eventually ended up in Detroit, where his hero Reuther agreed to an interview which lasted several hours. In later years, Palme regularly remarked during his many subsequent American visits, that the United States had made him a socialist, a remark that often has caused confusion. Within the context of his American experience, it was not that Palme was repelled by what he found in America, but rather that he was inspired by it.

After hitchhiking through the U.S. and Mexico, he returned to Sweden to study law at Stockholm University. In 1949 he became a member of the Swedish Social Democratic Party. During his time at university, Palme became involved in student politics, working with the Swedish National Union of Students. In 1951, he became a member of the social democratic student association in Stockholm, although it is asserted he did not attend their political meetings at the time. The following year he was elected President of the Swedish National Union of Students. As a student politician, he concentrated on international affairs and travelled across Europe.

Palme attributed his becoming a social democrat to three major influences:

- In 1947, he attended a debate on taxes between the Social Democrat Ernst Wigforss, the conservative Jarl Hjalmarson and the liberal Elon Andersson.
- The time he spent in the United States in the 1940s made him realise how wide the class divide was in America, and the extent of racism against black people.
- A trip to Asia, specifically India, Sri Lanka, Burma, Thailand, Singapore, Indonesia, and Japan in 1953 had opened his eyes to the consequences of colonialism and imperialism.

== Political career ==
=== Early political career ===
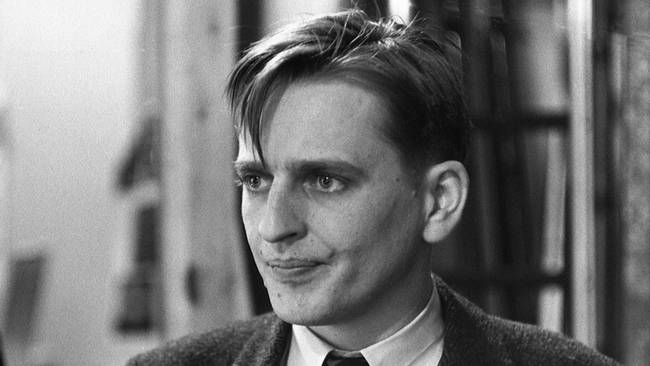
Palme in 1957

In 1953, Palme was recruited by social democratic prime minister Tage Erlander to work as his personal secretary, becoming the first of Erlander's large personal staff, a group of young aides such as Ingvar Carlsson and Bengt K. Å. Johansson, a group that became known as "the boys". From 1955 he was a board member of the Swedish Social Democratic Youth League and lectured at the Youth League College Bommersvik. He also was a member of the Worker's Educational Association.

In 1957, he was elected as a member of parliament (Swedish: riksdagsledamot) representing Jönköping County in the directly elected Second Chamber of the Riksdag. In the early 1960s Palme became a member of the Agency for International Assistance and was in charge of inquiries into assistance to the developing countries and educational aid. In 1963, he became a member of the Cabinet as minister without portfolio in the Cabinet Office, and retained his duties as a close political adviser to Prime Minister Tage Erlander. In 1965, he became Minister of Communications. One issue of special interest to him was the further development of radio and television, while ensuring their independence from commercial interests. In 1967 he became Minister of Education and Ecclesiastical Affairs, and the following year, he became Minister for Education and was the target of strong criticism from left-wing students protesting against the government's plans for university reform. The protests culminated with the occupation of the Student Union Building in Stockholm; Palme came there and tried to comfort the students, urging them to use democratic methods for the pursuit of their cause. On 21 February 1968, Palme participated in a protest in Stockholm against U.S. involvement in the war in Vietnam together with the North Vietnamese ambassador to the Soviet Union, Nguyễn Thọ Chân. The protest was organized by the Swedish Committee for Vietnam and Palme and Nguyen were both invited as speakers. As a result of this, the U.S. recalled its Ambassador from Sweden and Palme was fiercely criticised by the opposition for his participation in the protest.

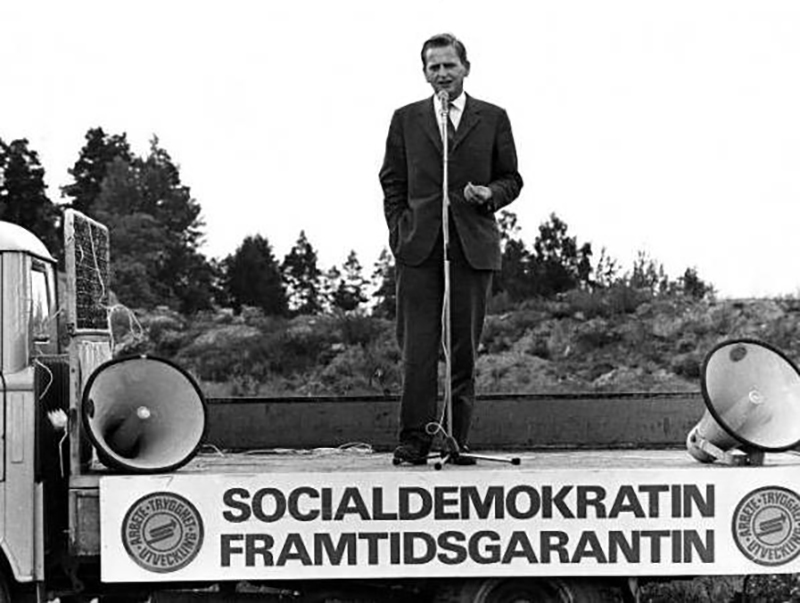
Palme in 1968

When party leader Tage Erlander stepped down in 1969, Palme was elected as the new leader by the Social Democratic party congress and asked by king Gustaf VI Adolf to form a government and succeed Erlander as Prime Minister. Prior to the selection of Palme, President of Finland Urho Kekkonen asked Erlander who his successor would be, and Erlander gave evasive answers. Kekkonen then asked if it would be Palme, to which Erlander responded, "Never, he is far too intelligent for a Prime Minister". Palme was later asked when Erlander first hinted to him that he wanted him to succeed him. Palme stated, "It never happened."

Palme was very popular among the left, but harshly detested by liberals and conservatives. This was due in part to his international activities, especially those directed against the US foreign policy, and in part to his aggressive and outspoken debating style.

=== Premierships (1969–76, 1982–86) ===
==== Domestic policy ====
As leader of a new generation of Swedish Social Democrats, Palme was often described as a "revolutionary reformist" and self-identified as a progressive. Domestically, his leftist views, especially the drive to expand labour union influence over business ownership, engendered a great deal of hostility from the organized business community.

During the tenure of Palme, several major reforms in the Swedish constitution were carried out, such as orchestrating a switch from bicameralism to unicameralism in 1971 and in 1975 replacing the 1809 Instrument of Government (at the time the oldest political constitution in the world after that of the United States) with a new one officially establishing parliamentary democracy rather than de jure monarchic autocracy, abolishing the Cabinet meetings chaired by the King and stripping the monarchy of all formal political powers.

His reforms on the labour market included establishing a law which increased job security. In the Swedish 1973 general election, the Socialist-Communist and the Liberal-Conservative blocs got 175 places each in the Riksdag. The Palme cabinet continued to govern the country, but several times they had to draw lots to decide on some issues, although most important issues were decided through a consensus agreement. Tax rates also rose from being fairly low even by Western European standards to the highest levels in the Western world.

Under Palme's premiership tenure, matters concerned with child care centers, social security, protection of the elderly, accident safety, and housing problems received special attention. Under Palme the public health system in Sweden became efficient, with the infant mortality rate standing at 12 per 1,000 live births. An ambitious redistributive programme was carried out, with special help provided to the disabled, immigrants, the low paid, single-parent families, and the old. The Swedish welfare state was significantly expanded from a position already one of the most far-reaching in the world during his time in office. As noted by Isabela Mares, during the first half of the Seventies "the level of benefits provided by every subsystem of the welfare state improved significantly." Various policy changes increased the basic old-age pension replacement rate from 42% of the average wage in 1969 to 57%, while a health care reform carried out in 1974 integrated all health services and increased the minimum replacement rate from 64% to 90% of earnings. In 1974, supplementary unemployment assistance was established, providing benefits to those workers ineligible for existing benefits. In 1971, eligibility for invalidity pensions was extended with greater opportunities for employees over the age of 60. In 1974, universal dental insurance was introduced, and former maternity benefits were replaced by a parental allowance. In 1974, housing allowances for families with children were raised and these allowances were extended to other low-income groups. Childcare centres were also expanded under Palme, and separate taxation of husband and wife introduced. Under Palme, over half of the Swedish economy was under state ownership, and the influence of the state had grown massively. Access to pensions for older workers in poor health was liberalised in 1970, and a disability pension was introduced for older unemployed workers in 1972.

The Palme cabinet was also active in the field of education, introducing such reforms as a system of loans and benefits for students, regional universities, and preschool for all children. Under a law of 1970, in the upper secondary school system "gymnasium", "fackskola" and vocational "yrkesskola" were integrated to form one school with 3 sectors (arts and social science, technical and natural sciences, economic and commercial). In 1975, a law was passed that established free admission to universities. A number of reforms were also carried out to enhance workers' rights. An employment protection Act of 1974 introduced rules regarding consultation with unions, notice periods, and grounds for dismissal, together with priority rules for dismissals and re-employment in case of redundancies. That same year, work-environment improvement grants were introduced and made available to modernising firms "conditional upon the presence of union-appointed 'safety stewards' to review the introduction of new technology with regard to the health and safety of workers". In 1976, an Act on co-determination at work was introduced that allowed unions to be consulted at various levels within companies before major changes were enforced that would affect employees, while management had to negotiate with labour for joint rights in all matters concerning organisation of work, hiring and firing, and key decisions affecting the workplace.

Palme's last government, elected during a time when Sweden's economy was in difficult shape, sought to pursue a "third way", designed to stimulate investment, production, and employment, having ruled out classical Keynesian policies as a result of the growing burden of foreign debt, together with the big balance of payments and budget deficits. This involved "equality of sacrifice", whereby wage restraint would be accompanied by increases in welfare provision and more progressive taxation. For instance, taxes on wealth, gifts, and inheritance were increased, while tax benefits to shareholders were either reduced or eliminated. In addition, various welfare cuts carried out before Olof's return to office were rescinded. The previous system of indexing pensions and other benefits was restored, the grant-in-aid scheme for municipal child care facilities was re-established, unemployment insurance was restored in full, and the so-called "no benefit days" for those drawing sickness benefits were cancelled. Increases were also made to both food subsidies and child allowances, while the employee investment funds (which represented a radical form of profit-sharing) were introduced.

In 1968, Palme was a driving force behind the release of the documentary They Call Us Misfits. The controversial film, depicting two social outcasts, was scheduled to be released in an edited form but Palme thought the material was too socially important to be cut.

An outspoken supporter of gender equality, Palme sparked interest for women's rights issues by attending a World Women's Conference in Mexico. He also made a feminist speech called "The Emancipation of Man" at a meeting of the Woman's National Democratic Club on 8 June 1970; this speech was later published in 1972.

As a forerunner in green politics, Palme was a firm believer in nuclear power as a necessary form of energy, at least for a transitional period to curb the influence of fossil fuel. His intervention in Sweden's 1980 referendum on the future of nuclear power is often pinpointed by opponents of nuclear power as saving it. As of 2011, nuclear power remains one of the most important sources of clean energy in Sweden, much attributed to Palme's actions. Palme advocated for nuclear energy to move away from fossil fuels in his speech during the Stockholm Conference in 1972.

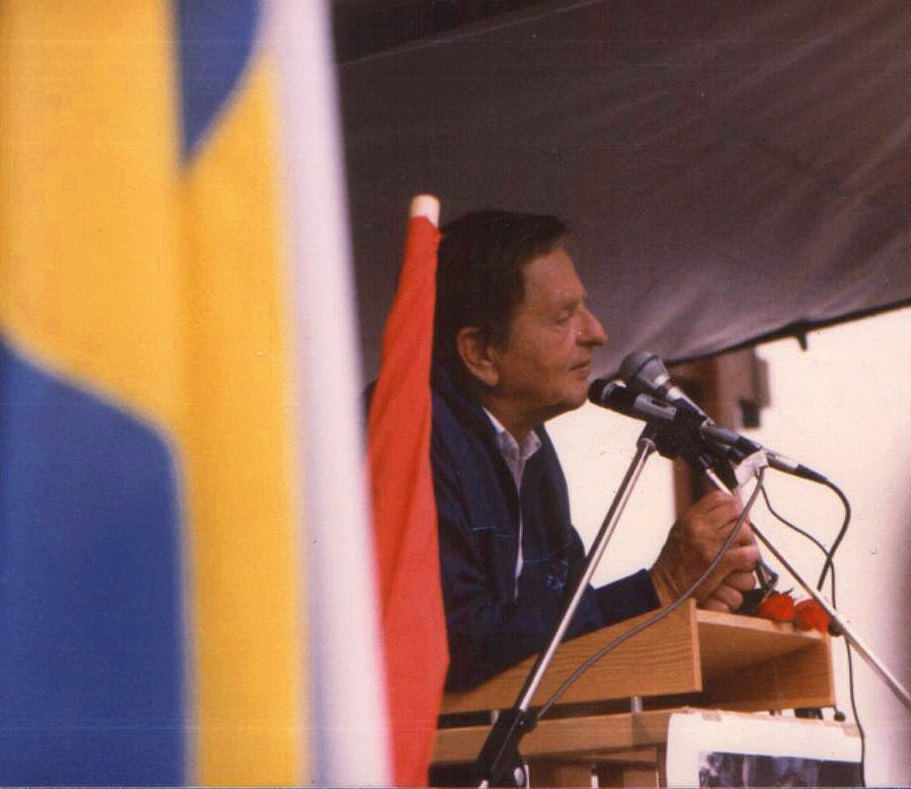
Palme in Mora, 1 August 1985

==== Foreign policy ====
Soviet–Swedish bilateral relations were tested during Palme's second period as prime minister in the 1980s, in particular, owing to reports of incursions by Soviet submarines into Swedish territorial waters.

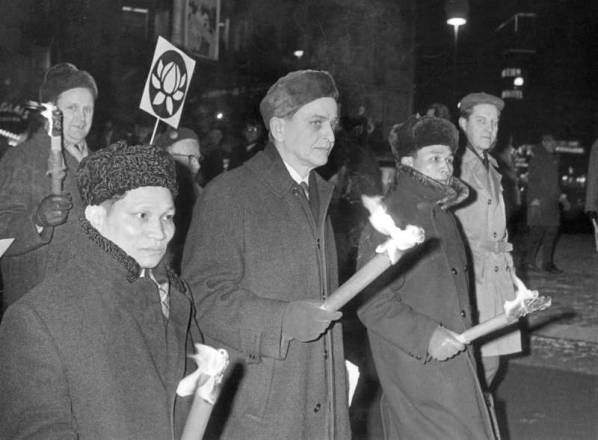
Olof Palme marching against the Vietnam War with the North Vietnamese ambassador Nguyễn Thọ Chân in Stockholm, 1968

On the international scene, Palme was a widely recognised political figure because of his:

- harsh and emotional criticism of the United States over the Vietnam War;
- vocal opposition to the crushing of the Prague Spring by the Soviet Union;
- criticism of European Communist regimes, including labeling the Husák regime as "The Cattle of Dictatorship" (Swedish: "Diktaturens kreatur") in 1975;
- campaigning against nuclear weapons proliferation;
- criticism of the Franco Regime in Spain, calling the regime "goddamn murderers" (Swedish: "satans mördare"; see Swedish profanity) after its execution of ETA and FRAP militants in September 1975;
- opposition to apartheid, branding it as "a particularly gruesome system", and support for economic sanctions against South Africa;
- support, both political and financial, for the African National Congress (ANC), the Palestine Liberation Organization (PLO) and the Polisario Front;
- visiting Fidel Castro's Cuba in 1975, during which he denounced Fulgencio Batista's government and praised contemporary Cuban revolutionaries;
- strong criticism of the Pinochet regime in Chile;
- support, both political and financial, for the FMLN-FDR in El Salvador and the FSLN in Nicaragua; and,
- role as a mediator in the Iran–Iraq War.

All of this ensured that Palme had many opponents as well as many friends abroad.

In June 1972 at the United Nations Conference on the Human Environment he described the environmental damage caused by the Vietnam War (including use of Agent Orange and other Rainbow Herbicides to deforest whole areas of the country) as ecocide and called for it to become an international crime.

On 23 December 1972, Palme (then Prime Minister) made a speech on Swedish national radio where he compared the ongoing U.S. bombings of Hanoi to historical atrocities, namely the bombing of Guernica, the massacres of Oradour-sur-Glane, Babi Yar, Katyn, Lidice and Sharpeville, and the extermination of Jews and other groups at Treblinka. The US government called the comparison a "gross insult" and once again decided to freeze its diplomatic relations with Sweden (this time the freeze lasted for over a year).

== Personal life ==
Between 1949 and 1952, Palme was married to Jelena Rennerová, a student whom he met in Prague, in a marriage of convenience. The arrangement was intended to enable her to leave Czechoslovakia following the 1948 coup d'état. After she reached Paris and later moved to Sweden, the marriage was dissolved. She later married the pediatrician Rolf Zetterström.

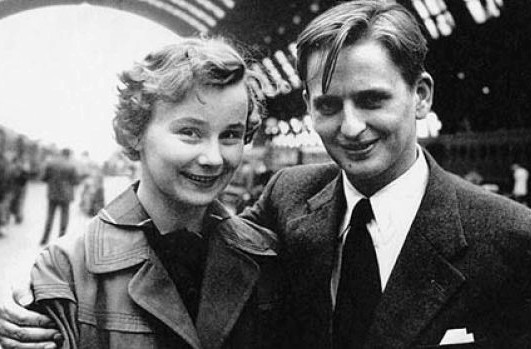
Palme and his wife Lisbeth on their honeymoon in 1956

In 1956, Palme married children's psychologist Lisbeth Beck-Friis, and together they had three sons: Joakim, Mårten, and Mattias Palme.

Palme was an atheist.

== Assassination and aftermath ==
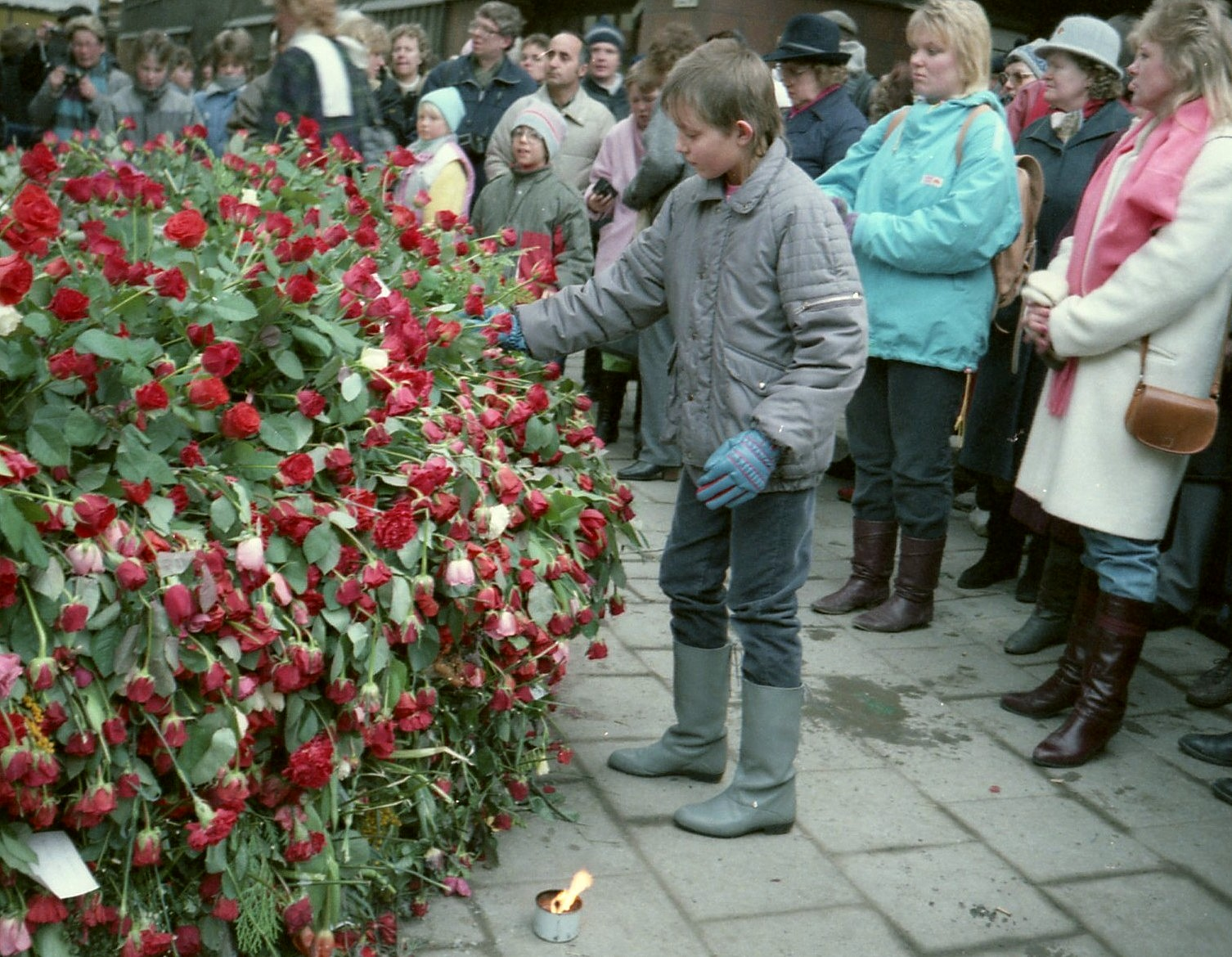
Mourners at the assassination site

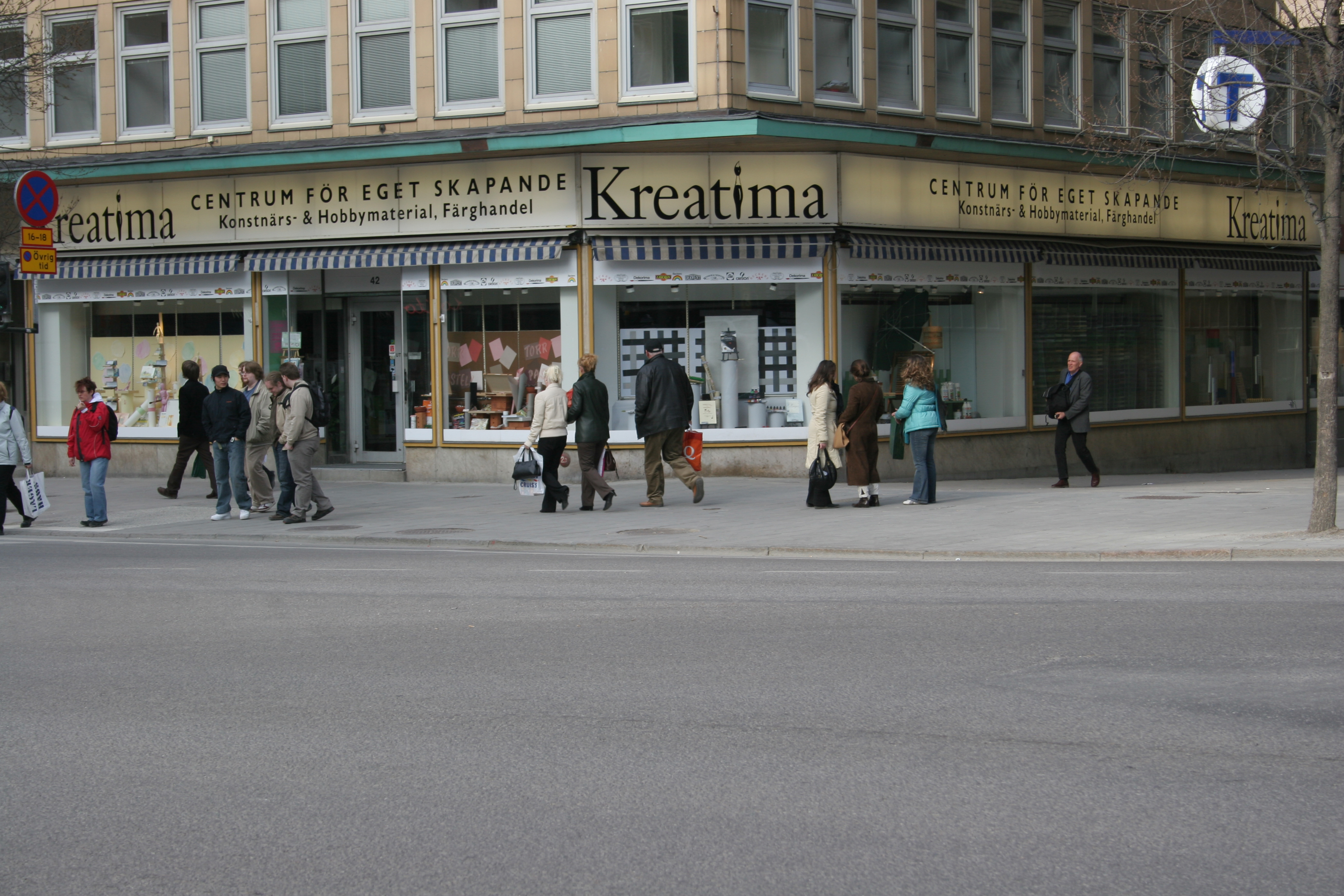
Crossing of Sveavägen and Tunnelgatan where Olof Palme was assassinated.

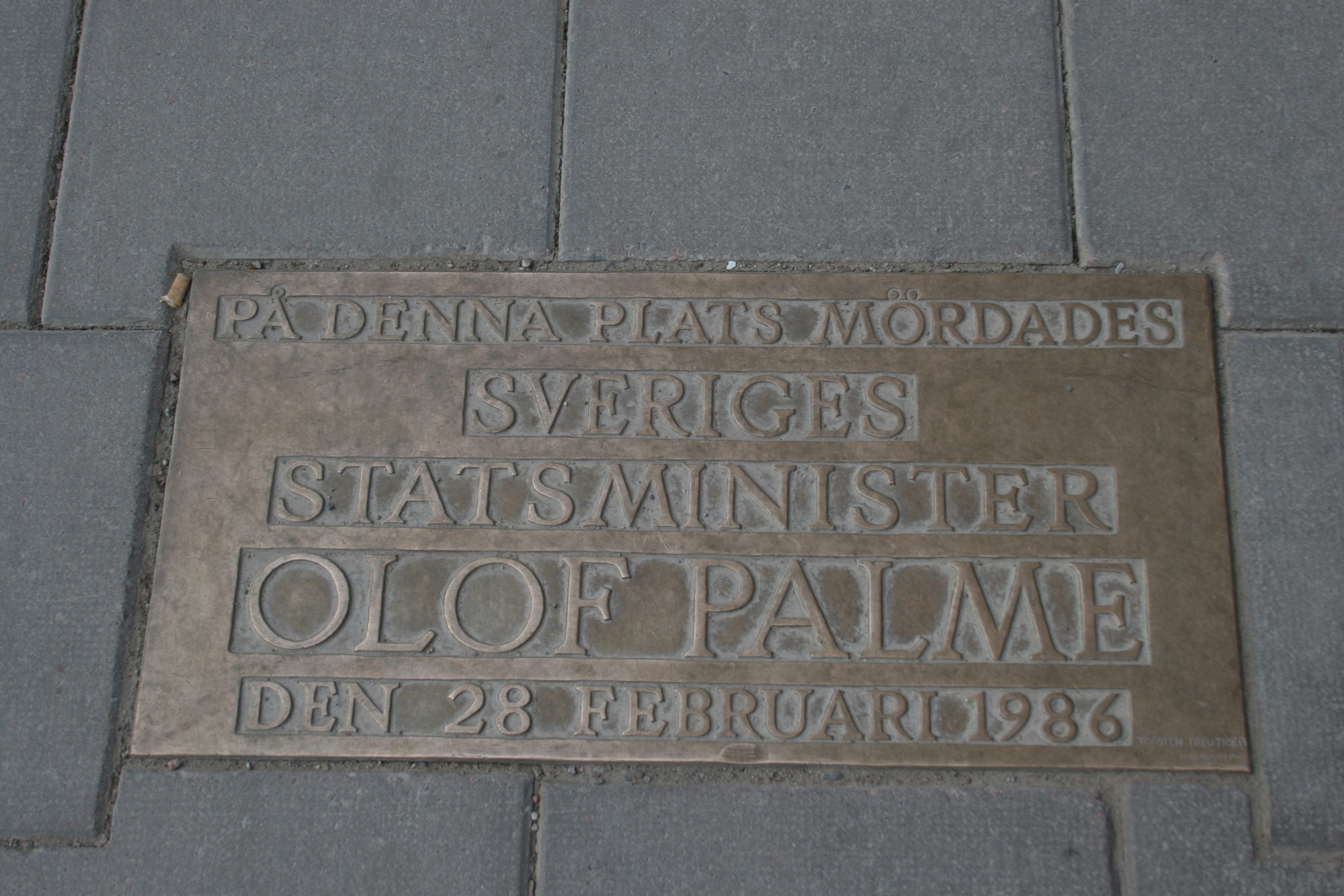
Commemorative plaque on the place where Olof Palme was assassinated.

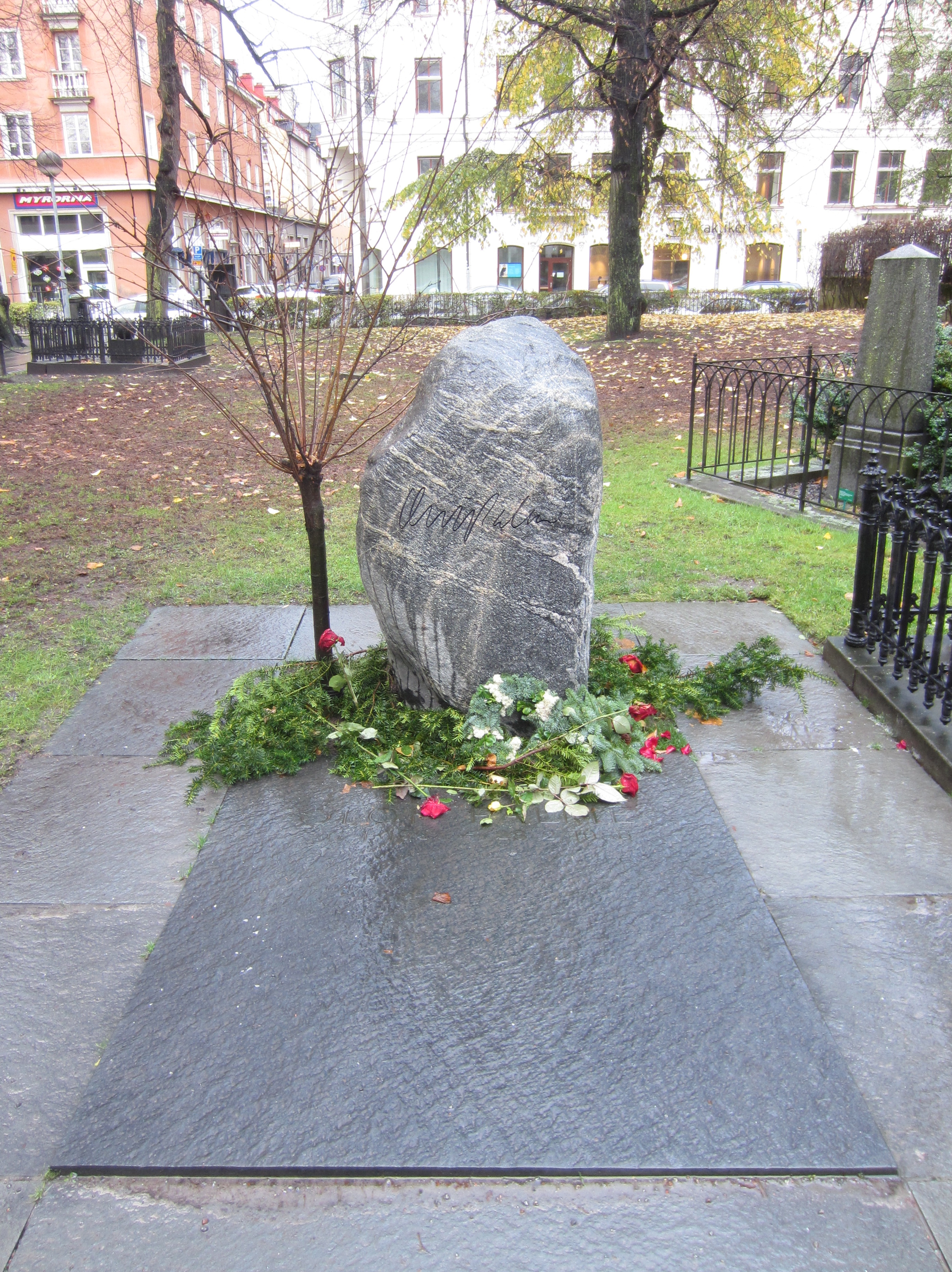
Palme's grave in Stockholm's Adolf Fredrik cemetery

Political violence was little-known in Sweden at the time, and Palme often went about without a bodyguard. Close to midnight on 28 February 1986, he was walking home from a cinema with his wife Lisbeth Palme in the central Stockholm street Sveavägen when he was shot in the back at close range. A second shot grazed Lisbeth's back. He was pronounced dead on arrival at the Sabbatsberg Hospital at 00:06 CET. Lisbeth survived without serious injuries.

Deputy Prime Minister Ingvar Carlsson immediately assumed the duties of Prime Minister, a post he retained until 1991 (and then again in 1994–1996). He also took over the leadership of the Social Democratic Party, which he held until 1996. Two years later, Christer Pettersson (d. 2004), a murderer, small-time criminal and drug addict, was convicted of Palme's murder, but his conviction was overturned. Another suspect, Victor Gunnarsson, emigrated to the United States, where he was the victim of an unrelated murder in 1993. The assassination remained unsolved.

A third and fourth suspect popularly referred to as "The Skandia Man" and GH, after their working place at the Skandia building next to the crime scene, and police investigation number ("H" representing the eighth letter, i.e. "Suspect Profile No. 8"), took their own lives in 2000 and 2008 respectively. Both fitted the suspect profile vaguely, and owned firearms. GH was a long-time suspect partly because he had self-described financial motives, and owned the only registered .357 Magnum in the Stockholm vicinity not tested and ruled out by authorities, which as yet has not been recovered.

On 18 March 2020, Swedish investigators met in Pretoria with members of South African intelligence agencies to discuss the case. The South Africans handed over their file from 1986 to their Swedish colleagues. Göran Björkdahl, a Swedish diplomat, had done independent research on Palme's assassination. Major General Chris Thirion, who headed the military intelligence of South Africa during the final years of apartheid rule, had told Björkdahl in 2015 that he believed South Africa was behind Palme's murder. Swedish investigators announced that they would reveal new information and close the case on 10 June 2020. Earlier remarks by lead investigator Krister Petersson that "there might not be a prosecution" have led commentators to believe that the suspect is dead.

On 10 June 2020, Swedish prosecutors stated publicly that they knew who had killed Palme and named Stig Engström, also known as "Skandia Man", as the assassin. Engström was one of about twenty people who had claimed to witness the assassination and was later identified as a potential suspect by Swedish writers Lars Larsson and Thomas Pettersson. Given that Engström had committed suicide in 2000, the authorities also announced that the investigation into Palme's death was to be closed.

Some politicians and journalists in Turkey relate the assassination of Palme to the PKK, since he was the first leader in Europe to designate the PKK as a terrorist organisation.

== See also ==
- List of Olof Palme memorials, for a list of memorials and places named after Olof Palme
- List of streets named after Olof Palme
- Olof Palme International Center
- Olof Palme Prize
- List of peace activists
- Sweden-bashing
- Anna Lindh
- Bernt Carlsson
- Folke Bernadotte
- Caleb J. Anderson
- IB affair, a political scandal involving Palme
- Ebbe Carlsson affair, a political scandal concerning non-official inquiries into the murder

Transnational offices
Preceded by Trygve Bratteli	President of the Nordic Council; 1979	Succeeded by Matthías Árni Mathiesen
Political offices
Preceded by Gösta Skoglund	Minister of Communications; 1965–1967	Succeeded by Svante Lundkvist
Preceded by Ragnar Edenman	Minister for Education; 1967–1969	Succeeded by Ingvar Carlsson
Preceded by Tage Erlander	Prime Minister of Sweden; 1969–1976	Succeeded by Thorbjörn Fälldin
Preceded by Thorbjörn Fälldin	Prime Minister of Sweden; 1982–1986	Succeeded by Ingvar Carlsson
Party political offices
Preceded by Tage Erlander	Leader of the Social Democratic Party; 1969–1986	Succeeded by Ingvar Carlsson
