= Lisbeth Palme =

Swedish psychologist and wife of Olof Palme

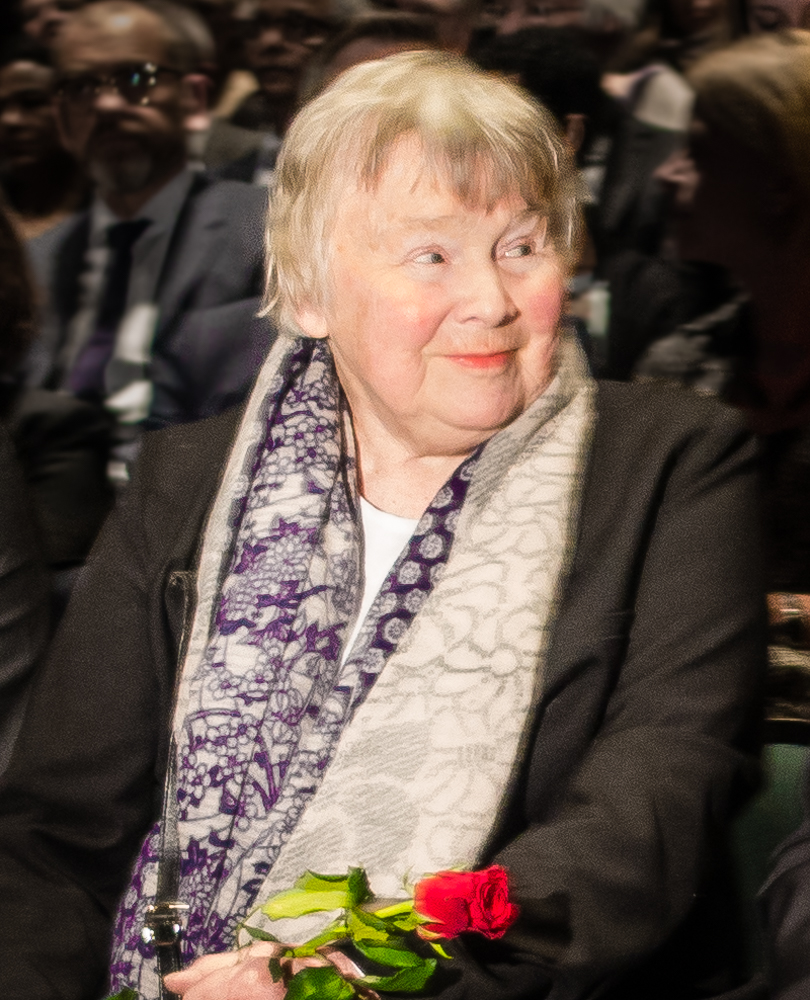
- Lisbeth Palme in 2016 at the 30th anniversary ceremony of the Olof Palme murder

Spouse of the Prime Minister of Sweden
- In role 8 October 1982 – 28 February 1986
- Prime Minister: Olof Palme
- Preceded by: Solveig Fälldin
- Succeeded by: Ingrid Carlsson
- In role 14 October 1969 – 8 October 1976
- Prime Minister: Olof Palme
- Preceded by: Aina Erlander
- Succeeded by: Solveig Fälldin

Personal details
- Born: Anna Lisbeth Christina Beck-Friis; 14 March 1931 Stockholm, Sweden
- Died: 18 October 2018 (aged 87) Stockholm, Sweden
- Party: Social Democratic
- Spouse: Olof Palme (m. 1956; died 1986)
- Children: Joakim Palme; Mårten Palme; Mattias Palme

Anna Lisbeth Christina Palme (née baroness Beck-Friis; 14 March 1931 – 18 October 2018) was a Swedish children's psychologist, UNICEF chairwoman and the wife of Swedish prime minister Olof Palme, until his assassination in 1986.

== Biography ==
=== Early life and studies ===
Anna Lisbet Christina Beck-Friis was born on 14 March 1931 in Stockholm, the daughter of civil engineer Ebbe Christian baron Beck-Friis and his wife Anna-Lisa Beck-Friis, née Bolling. She was born into the Beck-Friis branch of the Danish noble Beck family, which became established in Sweden, and her hereditary birth title was friherrinna Beck-Friis (Danish: friherreinde; English: baroness).

After graduating from the Nya Elementarskolan för flickor (New Elementary School for Girls) in Stockholm in 1950, she studied at Stockholm University, graduating in the summer of 1955.

=== Career ===
Palme worked as a children's psychologist and was during a period of time employed at Stockholm County Council, and later at the social department for Stockholm county.

She was the chairman of the Swedish UNICEF committee between 1987 and 1999, and in that role campaigned against the sexual exploitation of children. She became the international chairwoman for UNICEF between 1990 and 1991.

Palme was one of the champions for the Children's convention (Barnkonventionen) which was later established. She was a member of the Organisation of African Unity committee of investigation into the Rwandan genocide which reported its findings in 2000.

== Personal life ==
Lisbeth married politician Olof Palme on 9 June 1956. He became Sweden's prime minister from 1969 to 1976, and again between 1982 and 1986. Together they had three sons: Joakim, Mårten and Mattias. The couple had been married for almost 30 years when Olof Palme was assassinated in 1986.

Lisbeth Palme was an eyewitness to her husband's murder on the night of 28 February 1986, and struck by the second shot which grazed her back as she bent over to assist her husband. During the trial, she pointed out Christer Pettersson as the perpetrator of the killing. According to a detective present, she also made remarks that it was evident that Pettersson was an alcoholic. The comments were interpreted by some as if she had been informed that the suspect was an alcoholic and a drug addict. Several experts have, over the years, pointed towards the possibility that Lisbeth Palme may have identified the wrong man.

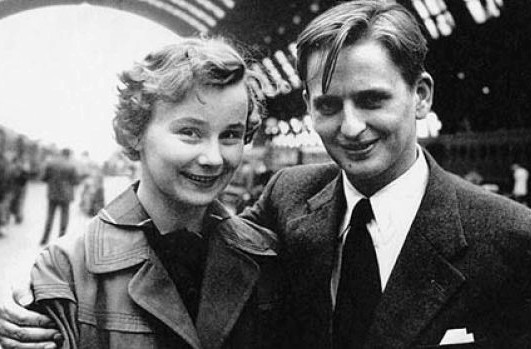
Lisbeth and Olof Palme on their honeymoon in 1956

== Death ==
Palme died on 18 October 2018, after suffering from an unspecified illness for some time. She was 87.
