= Ebbe Carlsson =

Swedish journalist and publisher

- Born: Nils Ebbe Knut Carlsson; 28 September 1947; Gothenburg, Sweden
- Died: 3 August 1992 (aged 44); Stockholm, Sweden
- Cause of death: HIV/AIDS
- Occupations: Journalist, publisher
- Known for: Ebbe Carlsson affair

Nils Ebbe Knut Carlsson (28 September 1947 – 3 August 1992) was a Swedish journalist, publisher, and political insider who became widely known for his close connections to senior Social Democratic figures and for his central role in the controversial Ebbe Carlsson affair during the investigation of the assassination of Prime Minister Olof Palme. He was born in Gothenburg in 1947 and showed early social confidence and networking skills. After finishing school, he worked briefly in journalism at outlets such as Dagens Nyheter and later moved between media roles in Malmö and Stockholm, including crime reporting and political journalism. During this period, he built an extensive network among journalists, civil servants, and Social Democratic politicians, eventually becoming a press secretary and later an information secretary in government circles.

In the 1970s, Carlsson held influential communication and publishing positions, including roles connected to ministries and later as an editor and publishing director within Social Democratic-leaning media organizations. He also worked in book publishing at Bonnier, where he had some commercial success as a publisher. His most controversial period came after the 1986 assassination of Olof Palme, when he became deeply involved in unofficial and secretive efforts to investigate the murder. He promoted the theory that the Kurdish PKK, allegedly with Iranian involvement, was behind the assassination. Carlsson conducted unofficial contacts, handled sensitive material, and engaged with police and political figures while pursuing his own investigative agenda. This culminated in the so-called Ebbe Carlsson affair, in which illegal surveillance equipment was smuggled into Sweden and political interference in the investigation was alleged. The scandal led to the resignation of Justice Minister Anna-Greta Leijon and widespread criticism of his role.

Carlsson was also openly homosexual and was diagnosed as HIV-positive in the mid-1980s. He later developed AIDS and publicly disclosed his illness in 1991, becoming one of the first prominent Swedes to do so. He published a semi-fictional book shortly before his death. He died in Stockholm in 1992 at age 44. His life is often remembered as a mix of media talent, political influence behind the scenes, and one of Sweden's most notable modern political scandals linked to the Palme investigation.

== Early life ==
Carlsson was born on 28 September 1947 in Lundby Parish in Gothenburg, Sweden. Carlsson grew up on Kronotorpsgatan in the Hisingen district of Gothenburg with his parents and two sisters. During his teenage years, he attended the science and mathematics track at Lundby School. Through his teachers, he came into contact with Margareta Artsman, then editorial secretary at Göteborgs-Tidningen, and with her help he obtained a part-time job in 1966 as an assistant caretaker at the newspaper's editorial office.

Isaksson (2007) argues that Carlsson early on demonstrated an ability to build relationships with adults, both with his teachers at school and with people at the newspaper. He projected self-confidence and possessed strong social skills. One person Carlsson got to know during this period was the journalist Bo Åkermark, who had an extensive network of contacts from his time in the organization Swedish Students' Temperance Society (Sveriges studerande ungdoms helnykterhetsförbund). After graduating from upper secondary school in 1968, Carlsson moved to Stockholm, where he had secured a summer job at Dagens Nyheter. When the summer ended, he was not offered a permanent position, so he moved to Copenhagen to study mathematics.

== Journalism career ==
At the end of 1968, Carlsson got a job at Sydsvenska Dagbladet in Malmö. His four-month temporary appointment soon became a permanent position as a general reporter specializing in crime journalism. In Malmö, he developed a social circle that included Torgny Wärn, Ulf Mörling, Fredrik Roos, and Claire Wikholm. He also began socializing with the newspaper's owner and editor-in-chief, Olof Wahlgren. Over time, Carlsson's reporting shifted toward labor-market policy. Carlsson's association with Wahlgren led, in late summer 1970, to accusations that he had been mapping employees' political affiliations on Wahlgren's behalf and making recommendations about who should or should not be dismissed. Carlsson admitted to the journalists' union that he had kept such notes, but maintained that they were for his private use only and that the information had not been passed on to the newspaper's management.

Carlsson had never concealed the fact that he was a Social Democrat, and in the autumn of 1970 he was offered a position as an editorial writer for Folkbladet Östgöten in Norrköping. He initially accepted but instead took a job in Stockholm as press secretary for the Swedish Confederation of Professional Associations (SACO) and its chairman, Bertil Östergren. In January 1971, he therefore moved into an apartment on Singelbacken on Djurgården that was owned by a friend of Bo Åkermark, the civil engineer Leif Backéus. In the spring of 1971, Östergren led SACO members at several government agencies into strike action. The government responded with emergency legislation that forced the strikers back to work. Member dissatisfaction was directed at Östergren, who chose to resign in October 1971. By that time, Carlsson had already left SACO and begun working as a journalist at the Stockholm office of Göteborgs Handels- och Sjöfartstidning, focusing on labor-market issues and national politics.

In late 1971, Carlsson began regularly visiting the Government Offices at Mynttorget without any particular business, simply sitting in the waiting room and chatting with civil servants. In this way, he became acquainted with several Social Democrats, including Prime Minister Olof Palme's associate Anders Ferm, cabinet minister Carl Lidbom, State Secretary for Foreign Affairs Sverker Åström, and Palme's press secretary Berit Rollén. Carlsson entertained them with political gossip and amusing stories, and it became natural for Palme himself to occasionally spend time talking with him. In the spring of 1972, Carlsson attempted to launch a Social Democratic weekly magazine, Politiken. However, despite support from Palme and Finance Minister Gunnar Sträng, the Swedish Trade Union Confederation (LO) was unwilling to provide the funding required for the project. Carlsson's apartment on Singelbacken in Djurgården became a social hub where his friends and colleagues—journalists, civil servants, and others—gathered for impromptu parties. Among the regular guests was Deputy Minister for Labor Anna-Greta Leijon, who married Leif Backéus in 1975. On a few occasions during the 1970s, Prime Minister Palme also visited Carlsson's home. To the outside world, Carlsson cultivated the impression that he was a close friend of Palme and his family.

== Information secretary ==
After Göteborgs Handels- och Sjöfartstidning (GHT) was shut down in 1973, Carlsson worked briefly for Dagens Eko at Sveriges Radio. At the turn of the year 1973–1974, however, he was appointed joint information secretary to Minister of Justice Lennart Geijer and cabinet minister Carl Lidbom. With an office on the same floor as Prime Minister Palme, his contacts with Palme became frequent and regular. Through the Chief of Police for Stockholm County, Carlsson had access to unmarked police vehicles, a privilege he used both to drive the Prime Minister home to Vällingby and for entirely private purposes. Following the occupation of the West German Embassy in 1975, Carlsson was criticized for hindering police operations and for attempting to take command of the officers assembled outside the building. As press secretary, Carlsson was also involved in concealing information about the Swedish Security Service's (Säpo) wiretapping of the headquarters of the Communist Party of Sweden. Together with Säpo chief Hans Holmér, Carlsson wrote a report on the so-called "hospital spy" at Sahlgrenska Hospital in Gothenburg. The report placed responsibility on Säpo in a manner that helped shield the previously exposed IB intelligence organization and the Social Democratic Party's efforts to monitor political opponents on the far left. Carlsson also played a role in the so-called Brothel affair. Shortly before the brothel operator Doris Hopp was arrested, he reportedly tried to persuade the police to stop investigating the case. He was also involved in the Geijer affair. In November 1977, Dagens Nyheter revealed that Justice Minister Geijer had visited a brothel and had already been identified as a security risk in 1969. On the newspaper's opinion page, Prime Minister Palme publicly denied the allegations; Palme's article had been written by Carlsson.

== Publisher ==
After the 1976 parliamentary election, the Social Democratic government resigned and Palme built up an opposition office in the Riksdag. Carlsson was not included in this, possibly because Palme knew that Carlsson had leaked a story about him to Sydsvenskan. In May 1975, the weekly magazine Vi began publishing the comic strip Ville by Jan Lööf, which satirized both Palme and the king. In November, Palme formally canceled his subscription to Vi, but Carlsson leaked this information to his friend Ulf Mörling at Sydsvenskan, and the tabloid press commented on Palme's alleged sensitivity. Carlsson was offered a position as political reporter at the A-Pressen news agency, but through Gunnar Sträng he instead became editor-in-chief of the Social Democratic daily newspaper Västgöta-Demokraten in Borås. He was tasked with modernizing the financially struggling newspaper and hired contributors such as Stig Hadenius and Britta Svensson.

At the end of 1978, he left his role as editor-in-chief and became director of Västgöta-Demokraten. In late summer 1979, he was asked to become publishing editor at Tidens förlag, accepted the offer, and moved back to Stockholm. While the publishing director Anders Ferm was on leave for his role as secretary-general in the Palme Commission and living in Vienna, Carlsson acted as his deputy. Ferm had decided to acquire Jean M. Auel's The Clan of the Cave Bear, which became a major success for the publisher. This success gave Carlsson a reputation for competence, and he was elected to the board of the Swedish Publishers' Association (Svenska Förläggareföreningen). However, the company's finances were in reality weak and by 1984 it was in free fall.

Carlsson was a close friend of Susanne Bonnier, and through Bonnier publishing he was offered a position as publisher and head of the Bonnier Fakta division from the turn of 1984/1985. At Bonnier, Carlsson proved to have a good instinct for the book industry, publishing Betty Mahmoody's novel Not Without My Daughter and Cecilia Lindqvist's Tecknens rike, both commercial successes. In 1984, Carlsson also became chairman of the Swedish Canoe Federation (Svenska Kanotförbundet).

== Ebbe Carlsson affair ==
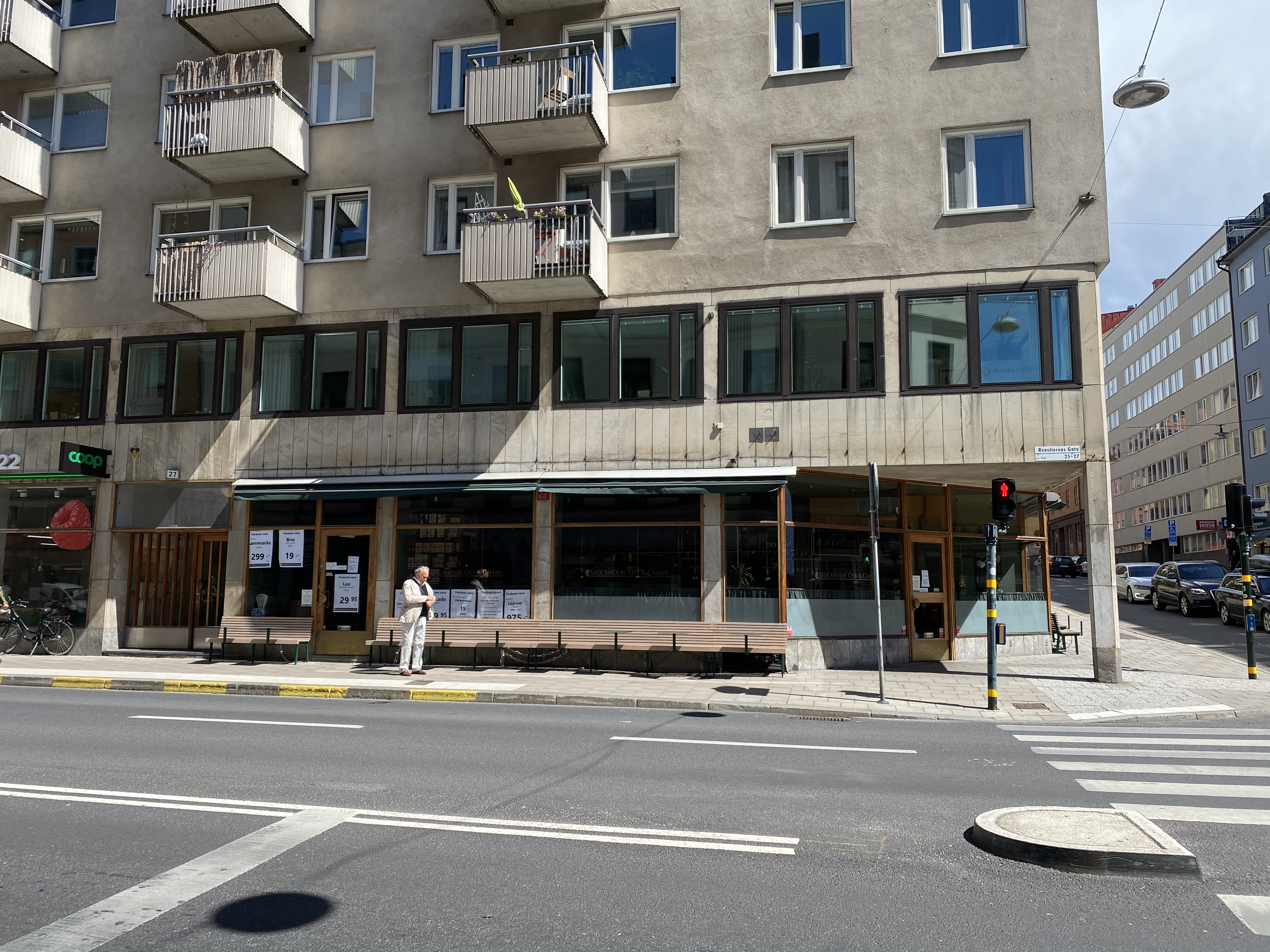
Renstiernas gata 27 in Södermalm where Ebbe Carlsson had a ten-room apartment where he carried out his secret and illegal wiretapping to investigate the so-called PKK lead

When Olof Palme was murdered on 28 February 1986, Carlsson was visiting Ambassador Carl Lidbom in Paris to celebrate his 60th birthday. Together with Lidbom, he traveled to the ski resort of Chamonix to locate Palme's son, Mattias. After returning to Stockholm, Carlsson called several friends and said that he had been informed by the head of the Security Service, Sven-Åke Hjälmroth, before the Paris trip that the Kurdish PKK was planning a murder in Sweden, but that Säpo did not know who the target would be. During the investigation of Palme's murder, Carlsson was able to follow developments closely: County Police Commissioner Hans Holmér had separated from his wife in Åkersberga and was living in Carlsson's apartment in Tantolunden. When Holmér informed acting Prime Minister Ingvar Carlsson on 3 March 1986 about the investigation, Ebbe Carlsson was also present.

Carlsson's theories about the Palme assassination were as follows:

- The Iranian government ordered the murder through the Kurdish PKK in retaliation for Palme's government rejecting Bofors' application to export the RBS 70 missile system to Iran.
- The murder was decided in August 1985 at a meeting between representatives of the Iranian government and the PKK in Damascus.
- The assassination was facilitated by failings within Säpo, meaning that Palme lacked bodyguards at the time of the murder.
- Senior officials, including Säpo's operational chief Per-Göran Näss, actively worked against the investigation's focus on the PKK because Säpo allegedly already knew before the murder that the PKK was planning such an attack.

In autumn 1987, Anna-Greta Leijon was appointed minister of justice, and one of her first actions was to sign directives for an inquiry into Säpo—especially whether failures within the agency had contributed to Palme lacking protection at the time of his death. The inquiry was chaired by Carl Lidbom. Lidbom was a close friend of Ebbe Carlsson and also of Prime Minister Ingvar Carlsson. Säpo chief Sune Sandström provided Carlsson with a police car and bodyguard P O Karlsson. National Police Commissioner Nils Erik Åhmansson was highly interested in Carlsson's murder theory and tasked him with traveling to Paris to meet Iran's former president Abolhassan Banisadr. From security officers Walter Kegö and Jan-Henrik Barrling, Carlsson obtained access to classified material from the PKK lead.

On 27 March 1988, Carlsson and Justice Minister Anna-Greta Leijon met at Bonnier's office on Sveavägen, where he presented his theories to her. The following day, Leijon raised the matter with Prime Minister Ingvar Carlsson. Whether the Prime Minister had been aware of these theories before that date remains unclear, although it is known that he met Lidbom on 8 December 1987 and 16 March 1988. On 9 May 1988, Carlsson presented his theories to the entire investigation leadership and prosecutor Jörgen Almblad.

From mid-May, journalist Per Wendel at Expressen began investigating Carlsson's role in the investigation. Carlsson had been given office space on Renstiernas gata by the police, where he wanted to establish a civilian investigative group. He tried to recruit Per Wendel and Jan Mosander from Dagens Eko to this group. Wendel continued investigating Carlsson's role and discovered that Minister of Justice Leijon had written a letter of recommendation stating that Carlsson was acting on her behalf. This was revealed by Expressen on 1 June. Late that same evening, Carlsson's bodyguard was arrested by customs in Helsingborg while attempting to smuggle in surveillance equipment. In the following days, Expressen revealed further irregularities and possible legal violations surrounding Carlsson's involvement. As a consequence, Anna-Greta Leijon resigned as minister of justice.

== Sexuality, HIV infection, and final years ==
Ebbe Carlsson was homosexual. He had many casual relationships with men, particularly in Copenhagen. In late spring 1985, Carlsson was informed that he was HIV-positive.

In spring 1991, Carlsson's only authored book was published, the roman à clef Liket i lådan. The smuggling of surveillance equipment led to Carlsson being prosecuted for aggravated smuggling and attempted aggravated smuggling. He was acquitted of these charges in Stockholm District Court in June 1991 but was convicted in the Svea Court of Appeal in February 1992 of incitement to smuggling and attempted smuggling, receiving a sentence of 100 day-fines.

By the turn of 1991/1992, his illness had severely weakened him and he left his job at Bonnier. Only his closest friends knew he was ill with AIDS before he publicly disclosed it in a television interview with Stina Dabrowski on 30 November 1991. He thereby became one of the first well-known Swedes to publicly announce an HIV infection. At that time, HIV/AIDS was still strongly associated with homosexuality.

Carlsson died on 3 August 1992 in St. John's Parish in Stockholm, Sweden. Towards the end of his life, he was cared for at the AIDS clinic of Huddinge Hospital. He gave detailed instructions regarding his own funeral, and in his will he stipulated that the contents of his laptop should be erased and all his private papers burned. His wish to be cremated on a burning canoe on Lake Riddarfjärden could not be carried out. At the memorial service at Norra Latin, Hans Holmér and Sverker Åström each gave a eulogy. After cremation, his ashes were scattered in the memorial grove at Lundby Old Cemetery.

== Bibliography ==
- Carlsson, Ebbe (1991). Liket i lådan : roman [The Corpse in the Box: A Novel] (in Swedish). Stockholm: Bonnier. ISBN 9100551643. SELIBR 7148650.
