= Sune Sandström =

Swedish police officer

- Born: Sune Olof Hilding Sandström; 26 June 1939; Nyhem, Bräcke Municipality, Sweden
- Died: 29 October 2011 (aged 72); Stockholm, Sweden
- Occupation: Police officer
- Known for: Chief of the Swedish Security Service
- Spouse: Ella Hallberg (m. 1967)
- Parents: Olof Sandström (father); Frida Sandström (née Sandelin) (mother)

Sune Olof Hilding Sandström (26 June 1939 – 22 October 2011) was a Swedish police officer. He was Chief of the Swedish Security Service from 1987 to 1989.

== Early life ==
Sandström was born on 26 June 1939 in Nyhem, Bräcke Municipality, Sweden, the son of merchant Olof Sandström and his wife Frida (née Sandelin). He grew up in Gäddede and passed studentexamen in Östersund.

== Career ==
After becoming a reserve officer, he was admitted to the district police superintendent (landsfiskal) education and obtained a district prosecutor's degree in Stockholm in 1965. He underwent police chief training in Stockholm in 1966. The same year, Sandström worked as a police secretary at the Swedish National Police Board. He was then secretary at Jämtland County Council from 1967 to 1969 and police secretary in Östersund from 1969-1971. Sandström served as Police Commissioner in Vilhelmina from 1971 to 1973 and as Chief Superintendent at the Swedish National Police Board from 1973 to 1979. During this time, Sandström received a Candidate of Law degree in Stockholm in 1975.

Sandström served as Deputy Police Commissioner in Stockholm from 1979 to 1987. In 1987, Sandström was appointed chief of the Swedish Security Service (RPS/Säk, later Säpo) during the very turbulent time after the assassination of Prime Minister Olof Palme. He left the post in 1989 in the aftermath of the Ebbe Carlsson affair and the Stig Bergling-affair and then became Head of Department at the Swedish National Police Board where he was responsible for coordinating the police work in connection with the UEFA Euro 1992. He was then head of the Police Operations Department at the Police Authority in Stockholm County before ending his career as Deputy County Police Commissioner in Stockholm County from 2000 to 2003.

== Enemy's Enemy (1989) ==
In the novel Enemy's Enemy (1989) by author Jan Guillou, Carl Hamilton is assigned from his clients to go to Moscow and kill the spy Stig Bergling (in the book called Stig Sandström) who has escaped during his conjugal visit, killed his wife and went to Moscow to work for the Russians. The surname Sandström was taken from Sune Sandström, the then head of the Swedish Security Service (Säpo).

== Personal life ==
In 1967 he Sandström married Ella Hallberg (born 1937). He had big interest in harness racing and was a member of the Stockholm travsällskap ("Stockholm's Harness Racing Society") and was for some time its auditor.

== Bibliography ==
- Sandström, Sune (1990). Rikskriminalen under nittiotalet: en översyn av rikskriminalens verksamhet och organisation. RPS redovisning, 99-0815361-7; 1990:1 (in Swedish). Stockholm: Rikspolisstyrelsen. SELIBR 1189662.

Civic offices
Preceded by Sven-Åke Hjälmroth	Chief of the Swedish Security Service; 1987–1989	Succeeded by Mats Börjesson as Director General
