= Between Summer's Longing and Winter's End =

2002 novel by Leif G. W. Persson

- Author: Leif G. W. Persson
- Original title: Mellan sommarens längtan och vinterns köld
- Translator: Paul Norlen
- Language: Swedish
- Genre: Scandinavian noir
- Set in: Sweden
- Publisher: Piratförlaget
- Publication date: 2002
- English publication date: 2010
- ISBN: 91-642-0056-6
- Followed by: Another Time, Another Life

Between Summer's Longing and Winter's End (Mellan sommarens längtan och vinterns köld) is a novel by Leif G. W. Persson, published in 2002.

Belonging to scandinavian noir genre, the novel switches through classic detective fiction, spy story and social novel.

Along with the following Another Time, Another Life (2003) e Falling Freely, as if in a Dream (2007), it composes the trilogy called Fall of the Welfare State.

== Plot ==
On November 22, 1985, US journalist John Krassner dies from the window of the fifteenth floor of a student residence in Stockholm and the case is filed as suicide. Deputy chief of Swedish National Criminal Police (RKP) Lars Martin Johansson, however, is not convinced of the official version and, when he finds a piece of paper with his (theoretically secret) private address in the heel of Krassner's shoe, he begins a solitary investigation.

The parallel storyline of the novel simultaneously concerns the events of Swedish Security Service (RPS/Säk), whose chief Erik Berg, with his protégé Claes Waltin, is instructed by the government to investigate the presence of right-wing extremists within the police forces.

Johansson discovers that Krassner was in Sweden to write a book about the Prime Minister of Sweden (which in the novel is never mentioned by name, but which is obviously inspired by Olof Palme), who had worked for the US CIA after World War II and until 1955 (recruited by Colonel John Buchanan, uncle of Krassner) and who is accused by Krassner of being then passed to the Russian secret services. The relationship between the two storylines consists in the fact that Krassner, because of his research, was kept under observation by Security Service.

On the background of a historical reconstruction of Swedish political and military situation between 1940 and 1990, Johansson understand that the journalist was killed and why, but he doesn't materially discover the culprit. The book finally ends with the killing of the prime minister in Stockholm on February 28, 1986. The reader, however, unlike Johansson, discovers that both murders are the work of Kjell Göran Hedberg ("external consultant" of RPS/Säk), both happened almost fortuitously: Krassner was killed because he had surprised Hedberg searching his room, while the prime minister was killed when Hedberg finds out from Waltin that the premier would go to the cinema without bodyguards.

== Historicity ==
The novel presents several characters that, although in some cases in a caricatural way, are recognizable as portraits of people who really existed:

- Prime Minister: Olof Palme (1927-1986), effectively killed on the night between 28 February and 1 March 1986
- Chief Commissioner of Stockholm Police – Hans Holmér (1930–2002)
- Bülling and Kudo (policemen) – Jan Henrik Barrling and Walter Kegö
- Wendell (journalist) – Per Wendel (1947–2005)
- homosexual diplomat – Sverker Åström (1915–2012)
- Forselius (mathematician) – Arne Beurling (1905–1986)
- Chief Inspector Koskinen – Tommy Lindström (1945-)

Furthermore, several elements of the story refer to traces actually followed during Palme murder investigation: CIA, RPS/Säk, Nazi policemen of the Norrmalm district, Swedish right-wing extremists.

The murderer of Palme, who in the novel is the fictitious collaborator of Security Service Kjell Göran Hedberg, has never been discovered.

== Adaptations ==
In 2013, a Swedish TV miniseries, En pilgrims död, was drawn from the combination of this novel and Falling Freely, as if in a Dream, directed by Kristoffer Nyholm and Kristian Petri.

== Bibliography ==
- Tapper, Michael (2014). Swedish Cops: From Sjöwall and Wahlöö to Stieg Larsson. Intellect Books. ISBN 978-1783201884.
