= Nils Erik Åhmansson =

Swedish civil servant

- Born: Nils Erik Hjalmar Åhmansson; 23 May 1941 (age 85); Gothenburg, Sweden
- Education: Lund University
- Occupation: Civil servant
- Years active: 1972–2015
- Spouse: Lena Carlstedt (m. 1968)

Nils Erik Hjalmar Åhmansson (born 23 May 1941), is a Swedish civil servant. Åhmansson was National Police Commissioner from 1 January 1988 to 20 October 1988. He was chairman of the Swedish Kennel Club from 1993 to 2015.

== Early life ==
Åhmansson was born on 23 May 1941 in Gothenburg, Sweden, the son of Carl-Erik Åhmansson, an insurance managing director, and his wife Ingeborg (née Wulff). He received a Candidate of Law degree in 1968 and did his clerkship from 1968 to 1970. Åhmansson underwent police chief training from 1971 to 1972.

== Career ==
Åhmansson served as a police secretary in Värmland from 1972 to 1975. He was then an expert in the Ministry of Justice from 1975 to 1982 and served as District Police Commissioner in Malmö from 1982 to 1986 as well as Chief Commissioner of Malmöhus County from 1986 to 1987. He was appointed National Police Commissioner by the Swedish government on 18 June 1987 after Holger Romander retired, and took office at the turn of the year 1987/88. At the same time, Sven-Åke Hjälmroth succeeded Hans Holmér as Chief Commissioner of Stockholm County. On 9 October, however, the government decided that Åhmansson would assume office prematurely, due to Stig Bergling's escape, in order to investigate what measures were required to avoid such recurrence. Within a year the Ebbe Carlsson affair had begun, which Åhmansson was personally involved in.

In connection with the investigation of the assassination of Olof Palme, Åhmansson met several times with the so-called "private investigator" Ebbe Carlsson. On 27 July 1988, Åhmansson and Holmér were questioned by the Committee on the Constitution, and during a second hearing of Åhmansson on 3 August, two police at the Swedish Security Service (Säpo) said that they perceived the case that Ebbe Carlsson acted on behalf of Åhmansson. Chancellor of Justice Hans Stark suspended the investigation of possible crimes against the confidentiality against Ebbe Carlsson on 3 October, and announced on the same day that he should instead review Åhmansson's duties. In his report on 17 October, Stark demanded that Åhmansson would resign, as he did on 19 October. Åhmansson then became an expert at the Ministry of Justice and became director of the insurance company Skandia.

Åhmansson was CEO of Stiftelsen Thulehem ("Thulehem Foundation") in Lund from 1990 to 1995. He has also been chairman of the National Society for Road Safety in Scania and Svenska stöldskyddsföreningen ("Swedish Theft Protection Association"). In the 1960s, Åhmansson joined the Swedish Kennel Club (SKK) organization, first in Skånska Taxklubben ("Scanian Dachshund Club"), later in the board of Skånska Kennelklubben ("Scanian Kennel Club"). He has been active as a test examiner and wild spurs judge, has been active in the SKK Disciplinary Board and at the Central Board. He was chairman of the Swedish Kennel Club from 1993 to 2015. Åhmansson, in his capacity as chairman of the Swedish Kennel Club, held a place in the Swedish Cynological Academy. He was elected chairman of the Swedish Cynological Academy at its first meeting.

== Personal life ==
In 1968, he married the physiotherapist Lena Carlstedt (born 1941), the daughter of Arne Carlstedt and Karin (née Larsson).

Civic offices
Preceded by Holger Romander	National Police Commissioner; 1 January 1988–20 October 1988	Succeeded by Björn Eriksson
