= Holger Romander =

Swedish civil servant (1921–2020)

National Police Commissioner
- In office 1978–1987
- Monarch: Carl XVI Gustaf
- Prime Minister: Ingvar Carlsson; Olof Palme; Ola Ullsten; Thorbjörn Fälldin
- Preceded by: Carl Persson
- Succeeded by: Nils Erik Åhmansson

Prosecutor-General of Sweden
- In office 1966–1978
- Monarch: Carl XVI Gustaf
- Prime Minister: Thorbjörn Fälldin; Olof Palme; Tage Erlander
- Preceded by: Karl Emanuel Walberg
- Succeeded by: Magnus Sjöberg

Personal details
- Born: Holger Axel Gustaf Romander; 6 March 1921 Boden, Sweden
- Died: 25 January 2020 (aged 98) Lidingö, Sweden
- Spouse: Birgitta Sandelin (m. 1955)
- Children: 1
- Education: Stockholm University College
- Profession: Jurist

Holger Axel Gustaf Romander (6 March 1921 – 25 January 2020) was a Swedish civil servant. He served as the Prosecutor-General of Sweden from 1966 to 1978 and as the National Police Commissioner from 1978 to 1987.

== Early life ==
Romander was born on 6 March 1921 in Boden, Sweden, the son of Lieutenant Colonel Nils Romander and his wife Ester (née Steinbeck). He received a Bachelor of Arts degree in Stockholm in 1943 and a Candidate of Law degree in 1946.

== Career ==
Romander became a public prosecutor in Göta Court of Appeal in 1949 and served as notary and secretary of the First Law Committee from 1952 to 1955. He had legislative assignments at the Ministry of Justice and the Ministry of Health and Social Affairs in 1956, and from 1958 to 1960. He became assessor in 1958 and hovrättsråd in 1961. He served as director of the Swedish Prison Board and acting director general from 1960 to 1964. Romander became head of a legal (law-drafting) division at the Ministry of Justice in 1964 and director general for legal affairs there in 1965.

In 1966, Romander was appointed Prosecutor-General of Sweden. He held that position until 1978 when he was appointed National Police Commissioner. During 1983-1984, Romander was personally involved in the investigation of Sweden's greatest blackmail cases, Operation Cobra. In February 1986, the Prime Minister Olof Palme was assassinated, Romander was about to retire, but was asked by the Swedish government to continue working and then came to be the highest police chief during the investigation's first two years. During a turbulent time, when the chief investigator Hans Holmér was fired, Romander was also commissioned by the government to take over the investigation together with the Prosecutor General. The government, through Minister for Justice Sten Wickbom, ordered Romander, despite the failure of the PKK lead, to continue the investigation against the Kurdish organization - with 300 police officers.

He left the position of National Police Commissioner in 1987 and was succeeded by Nils Erik Åhmansson. Romander was then chairman of the Swedish Criminal Injuries Compensation Board (Brottsskadenämnden) from 1988 to 1995.

== Personal life ==
In 1955, he married Birgitta Sandelin (born 1929), the daughter of Lieutenant Colonel Melcher Sandelin and Edith Johnsson. They had one daughter, Viveka (born 1958).

== Death ==
Romander died on 25 January 2020 in Lidingö. The funeral took place in Lidingö Church on 6 March 2020.

== Bibliography ==
- Romander, Holger (2018). Såvitt jag minns (in Swedish). [Stockholm]: Vulkan. ISBN 9789188857729. SELIBR w58xv28zt8zw296x.
- Romander, Holger; Korsell, Lars, eds. (2000). Antologi: perspektiv på ekobrottsligheten. BRÅ-rapport, 1100-6676; 2000:10 (in Swedish). Stockholm: Brottsförebyggande rådet (BRÅ. ISBN 913831620X. SELIBR 7267335.
- Romander, Holger; Bergström, Gunvor (1965). Övervakningsnämnderna. Brottsbalken (in Swedish). Stockholm: Justitiedepartementet. SELIBR 727263.
- Romander, Holger; Granath, Karl-Erik; Rosén, Göta (1960). 1960 års barnavårdslag: kommentarer (in Swedish). Stockholm: Sveriges socionomers riksförbund. SELIBR 10879090.
- Romander, Holger; Grönlund, Bertil, eds. (1961). Barnavårdslagen. Norstedts gula bibliotek, 99-0116326-9 (in Swedish). Stockholm: Norstedt. SELIBR 573070.

Legal offices
Preceded by Karl Emanuel Walberg	Prosecutor-General of Sweden; 1966–1978	Succeeded by Magnus Sjöberg
Civic offices
Preceded by Carl Persson	National Police Commissioner; 1978–1987	Succeeded by Nils Erik Åhmansson
