= Carl Lidbom =

Politician and Member of the parliament of Sweden

Ambassador of Sweden to France
- In office 1982–1992
- Monarch: Carl XVI Gustaf
- Preceded by: Sverker Åström
- Succeeded by: Stig Brattström

22nd Minister of Commerce and Industry
- In office 10 November 1975 – 8 October 1976
- Monarch: Carl XVI Gustaf
- Prime Minister: Olof Palme
- Preceded by: Kjell-Olof Feldt
- Succeeded by: Staffan Burenstam Linder

1st Minister for Government Coordination
- In office 1 January 1975 – 1 November 1975
- Monarch: Carl XVI Gustaf
- Prime Minister: Olof Palme
- Preceded by: None
- Succeeded by: Thage G. Peterson

Personal details
- Born: Carl Gunnar Lidbom; 2 March 1926 Stockholm, Sweden
- Died: 26 July 2004 (aged 78) Nykvarn, Sweden
- Party: Social Democratic Party
- Spouse: Lena Hesselgren (m. 1950; died 1992)
- Profession: Jurist

Carl Gunnar Lidbom (2 March 1926 – 26 July 2004) was a Swedish jurist. He served as minister of commerce and industry from 1975 and 1976 and as Ambassador of Sweden to France from 1982 to 1992. During his time in the Government Offices, he worked, among other things, on drafting a new Swedish constitution, which transformed the Riksdag from a bicameral legislature into a unicameral one.

== Early life ==
Lidbom was born on 2 March 1926 in Stockholm, Sweden, the son of Gunnar Lidbom, a judge of appeal, and his wife Sally (née Lutteman). He passed studentexamen in 1944 and received a Bachelor of Arts degree in 1947 and a Candidate of Law degree in Stockholm in 1950.

== Career ==
Lidbom did his clerkship in Sollentuna and Färentuna territorial jurisdiction from 1950 to 1953 and worked as an extra legal clerk (fiskal) in the Svea Court of Appeal in 1954, as court secretary in Lindes and Nora territorial jurisdiction in 1955 and as deputy secretary and acting secretary in the Labour Court (Arbetsdomstolen) from 1956 to 1958. He worked as an expert in the Ministry of the Interior in 1959 and in the Ministry of Health and Social Affairs in 1960. Lidbom was assessor in the Svea Court of Appeal in 1961, director (byråchef) in the Ministry of Health and Social Affairs in 1963, deputy director-general (departementsråd) in the Ministry of Justice in 1965 and director there in 1966 and acting director-general for legal affairs (rättschef) there in 1967. Lidbom was then director-general for legal affairs there from 1968 to 1969 and he was appointed became Hovrättsråd in 1969. Lidbom served as a minister without portfolio from 1969 to 1975 and was minister of commerce and industry and head of the Ministry of Commerce and Industry from 1975 to 1976. He was a member of the Riksdag from the Social Democrats from 1974 to 1982. Lidbom then served as Swedish Ambassador to France from 1982 to 1992, the same year his wife died.

Lidbom was assistant teacher in law at Stockholm University from 1959 to 1965 and served as an expert in negotiations, among other things in the Council of Europe and in the International Labour Organization from 1961 to 1965, and as an expert in the Constitutional Preparation (Grundlagberedningen) and in Tax Punishment Law Inquiry (skattestrafflagutredningen) from 1966 as well as the County Democracy Inquiry (Länsdemokratiutredningen). Lidbom was replacement for the deputy chairman of the Labour Court from 1968 to 1969, and had international assignments, among others thing in the Nordic Council, the Council of Europe, OECD, the International Labour Organization, the United Nations Conference on Trade and Development and in the United Nations.

Lidbom was known in certain circles by the nickname "Calle Batong", and his tough legislative approach also gave rise to the term "Lidbomeri," which refers to hastily drafted laws often driven by political motives.

== Ebbe Carlsson affair ==
External videos
- Björck and Lidbom clash
- Complete 5 hour hearing

After the assassination of Olof Palme, Prime Minister Ingvar Carlsson asked Lidbom to lead an investigation into Säpo's role in, among other things, the Palme assassination. With the help of his close friend Ebbe Carlsson, a book publisher but also a private investigator, Lidbom began to examine the so-called PKK lead. In 1988, Expressen reporter Per Wendel exposed the collaboration and dubbed it the "Ebbe Carlsson affair," triggering a political scandal that forced Justice Minister Anna-Greta Leijon to resign. Some time later, on 9 March 1989, Carl Lidbom was called to account for his actions before the Committee on the Constitution. The committee's vice chairman Anders Björck questioned the Paris ambassador and Säpo investigator Carl Lidbom. Lidbom accused Björck of coming up with insinuating questions. In interviews, Lidbom had stated that the letter of recommendation (from Leijon to Carlsson) and the secret Säpo documents that Carlsson had acquired were a "trivial matter" and a "minor offense on par with a parking violation." Björck asked if Lidbom had his wife read secret documents. Lidbom snorted at the question:

- Lidbom: That question is just nonsense. You won't get an answer because it's nonsense.
- Björck: You have allowed your wife to read classified documents.
- Lidbom: You won't get an answer because what you're doing is nonsense.
- Björck: I don't think it's up to Carl Lidbom to make such statements here. You should know your place when you're here! Period!

== Personal life ==
In 1950, Lidbom married Lena Hesselgren (1927–1992), the daughter of district judge (häradshövding) Ove Hesselgren and Malin (née Lundblad). They had two children: Helen (born 1951) and Mona (born 1954). His wife, who suffered from polio for many years, died in 1992.

Lidbom's personal life was at times the subject of various writings. In 1989, the media aroused interest when he took his mistress aboard a military ship during an official visit to France. Lidbom later came to write a book about the love of his handicapped wife where he also told openly about his infidelity.

== Death ==
Lidbom died on 26 July 2004 and was buried at Kungsbrolunden next to Turinge Church in Turinge-Taxinge Parish (Turinge-Taxinge församling).

== Selected bibliography ==
- Lidbom, Carl (1994). Lagstiftningsmaktens gränser (in Swedish). Stockholm: Juristförl. ISBN 91-7598-622-1. SELIBR 7651065.
- Lidbom, Carl (1990). Ett uppdrag (in Swedish). Stockholm: Wahlström & Widstrand. ISBN 9146158235. SELIBR 7281530.
- Lidbom, Carl (1989). SÄPO: Säkerhetspolisens arbetsmetoder : rapport. Statens offentliga utredningar, 0375-250X; 1989:18 (in Swedish). Stockholm: Allmänna förl. ISBN 9138102951. SELIBR 7263350.
- Lidbom, Carl (1982). Reformist (in Swedish). Stockholm: Tiden. ISBN 9155027342. SELIBR 7421047.
- Lidbom, Carl (1981). Frihet, rättssäkerhet och effektiv samhällsstyrning: ett dilemma för lagstiftarna (in Swedish). Stockholm. SELIBR 675217.
- Lidbom, Carl (1976). Näringslivet och den nya ekonomiska världsordningen. Företag och samhälle, 0348-7830; 1976:2 (in Swedish). Stockholm: Studieförb. Näringsliv och samhälle (SN&S). SELIBR 465120.

Government offices
Preceded by None	Minister for Government Coordination; 1975–1975	Succeeded by Thage G. Peterson
Preceded by Kjell-Olof Feldt	Minister of Commerce and Industry; 1975–1976	Succeeded by Staffan Burenstam Linder
Diplomatic posts
Preceded by Sverker Åström	Ambassador of Sweden to France; 1982–1992	Succeeded by Stig Brattström
