= Magnus Sjöberg =

Swedish jurist (1927–2024)

President of the Supreme Administrative Court of Sweden
- In office 1990–1994
- Monarch: Carl XVI Gustaf
- Prime Minister: Carl Bildt; Ingvar Carlsson
- Preceded by: Bengt Hamdahl
- Succeeded by: Göran Wahlgren

Prosecutor-General of Sweden
- In office 1978–1989
- Monarch: Carl XVI Gustaf
- Prime Minister: Ingvar Carlsson; Olof Palme; Ola Ullsten; Thorbjörn Fälldin
- Preceded by: Holger Romander
- Succeeded by: Torsten Jonsson

Personal details
- Born: Karl Gustaf Magnus Sjöberg; 26 September 1927 Klinte, Sweden
- Died: 29 December 2024 (aged 97) Södertälje, Sweden
- Spouse: Ragnhild Ljunggren (m. 1931)
- Education: Uppsala University
- Profession: Jurist

Karl Gustaf Magnus Sjöberg (26 September 1927 – 29 December 2024) was a Swedish jurist. He served as the Prosecutor-General of Sweden from 1978 to 1989, and as President of the Supreme Administrative Court of Sweden from 1990 to 1994.

== Early life ==
Sjöberg was born in Klinte, Sweden on 26 September 1927, the son of the Gustaf Sjöberg, a provost, and his wife Elsa (born Kloetzen). He received a Candidate of Law degree from Uppsala University in 1953.

== Career ==
Sjöberg did his clerkship from 1953 to 1956. Sjöberg served as an extra legal clerk (fiskal) in the Svea Court of Appeal in 1956 and tingsrätt secretary in the Nedansiljan Judicial District from 1957 to 1959. Sjöberg was then a judge (rådman) in Visby from 1959 to 1961 and a co-opted member of the Svea Court of Appeal from 1961 to 1962, and became an associate judge there in 1963. He became a hovrättsråd in 1969. He was deputy secretary of the First Law Committee from 1963 to 1964, and secretary there from 1964 to 1965. Sjöberg was an expert at the Ministry of Justice from 1965 to 1967, and served as acting deputy director-general (departementsråd) in the Prime Minister's Office (Statsrådsberedningen) in 1967. He was then director-general for legal affairs (rättschef) there from 1967 to 1972, Justice of the Supreme Court of Sweden from 1972 to 1978, and Prosecutor-General of Sweden from 1978 to 1989. Sjöberg served as President of the Supreme Administrative Court of Sweden from 1990 to 1994.

Sjöberg was chairman of a number of boards and associations: Swedish Association of Criminalists (Svenska kriminalistföreningen) from 1980 to 1989, the Swedish department of the AIDP from 1981 to 1989, the BONUS association from 1973, the Board of Prison Terms (Kriminalvårdsnämnden) from 1995, the Disciplinary Committee of the Authorized Public Accountants' Association (Föreningen Auktoriserade Revisorers disciplinnämnd) from 1994 and of the Institute for Research in Law History (Stiftelsen Institutet för rättshistorisk forskning) from 1996. Sjöberg became an honorary member of the Gotlands nation at Uppsala University in 1988.

== Personal life and death ==
In 1953, he married Ragnhild Ljunggren (born 1931), a pharmacist, the daughter of Bengt Ljunggren and Elisabeth (née Wistrand).

Sjöberg died on 29 December 2024, at the age of 97.

== Awards and decorations ==
- (Sweden) H. M. The King's Medal, 12th size gold medal worn around the neck on a chain of gold (silver-gilt) (1993)
- (Sweden) Commander of the Order of the Polar Star (18 November 1971)

Legal offices
Preceded by Holger Romander	Prosecutor-General of Sweden; 1978–1989	Succeeded by Torsten Jonsson
Preceded by Bengt Hamdahl	President of the Supreme Administrative Court of Sweden; 1990–1994	Succeeded by Göran Wahlgren
