= Doris Hopp =

Swedish brothel madam

- Born: 16 July 1930
- Died: 31 October 1998 (aged 68)
- Occupation: Brothel madam
- Years active: 1970s

Doris Hopp (16 July 1930 – 31 October 1998) was a Swedish brothel madam who organized a network of call girls in Stockholm, Sweden, in the early 1970s. She was arrested on pimping charges in 1976. A police investigation soon revealed that many of Hopp's customers were well-known politicians and other dignitaries.

In November 1977, the newspaper Dagens Nyheter published allegations citing Justice Minister Lennart Geijer as one of Hopp's customers. The newspaper claimed as its source a classified report in which the chief of police Carl Persson had informed Prime Minister Olof Palme of the involvement of politicians in the prostitution scandal. At the time of the scandal broke, it was legal to pay for sexual services, but the fact that politicians socialized with prostitutes was viewed as a security risk as staff from foreign embassies were also reported to frequent the brothel.

Prime Minister Palme strongly denied the allegations, accusing the newspaper of aggravated libel. The newspaper was forced into a retreat and two days after the publication Lennart Geijer received an official apology. Years later, it emerged that a few minor details aside, the newspaper's assertions had in fact been largely correct. Over the years, there has been much speculation regarding the identities of those who made use of the brothel's services. Former Prime Minister Thorbjörn Fälldin and former Centre Party leader Olof Johansson have both publicly denied frequenting Hopp's brothel.
