= Per Wendel Award =

The Per Wendel Award (Swedish: Per Wendel-priset) is a Swedish award given to a journalist by the newspaper Expressen. The award money sum is 75,000 (SEK). The award is given annually in the memory of Swedish journalist Per Wendel (1947–2005) who worked for Expressen from 1973 primarily as a domestic policy reporter.

== Awardees ==
- 2006: Fredrik Sjöshult
- 2007: Jan Mosander
- 2008: Anna Jaktén
- 2009: Christian Holmén and Micke Ölander
- 2010: Janne Josefsson
- 2011: Anette Holmqvist
- 2012: Hannes Råstam
- 2013: Mats-Eric Nilsson
- 2014: Carolina Neurath
