= Jan Stocklassa =

Swedish diplomat and businessman

Jan Stocklassa (born 1965) is a former Swedish diplomat and businessman.

He served as the Swedish commercial counsellor for the Swedish Trade Council, the commercial section of the embassy, in Prague, Czech Republic from 1997 to 2003.

He is the author of the novel Gripen av Prag, a fictionalized account based on Stocklassa's experiences when it emerged that a Czech supersonic jetfighter deal involving Saab and British Aerospace had shown signs of corruption.

He has since served at a senior level on the board of Boss Media, a Swedish-based supplier of online gambling software infrastructure, and previously as head of the international division of software company Svenska Spel.

In 2018 his book Stieg Larssons arkiv was published, and released in English the following year, translated by Tara F. Chace, under the title The Man Who Played with Fire: Stieg Larsson's Lost Files and the Hunt for an Assassin. In the book Stocklassa presents a biographical profile of crime writer Stieg Larsson and investigates the assassination of Olof Palme, presenting theories based on Larsson's research into the Swedish far right and its possible connections to the assassination.
