= Björn Eriksson (civil servant) =

Swedish civil servant

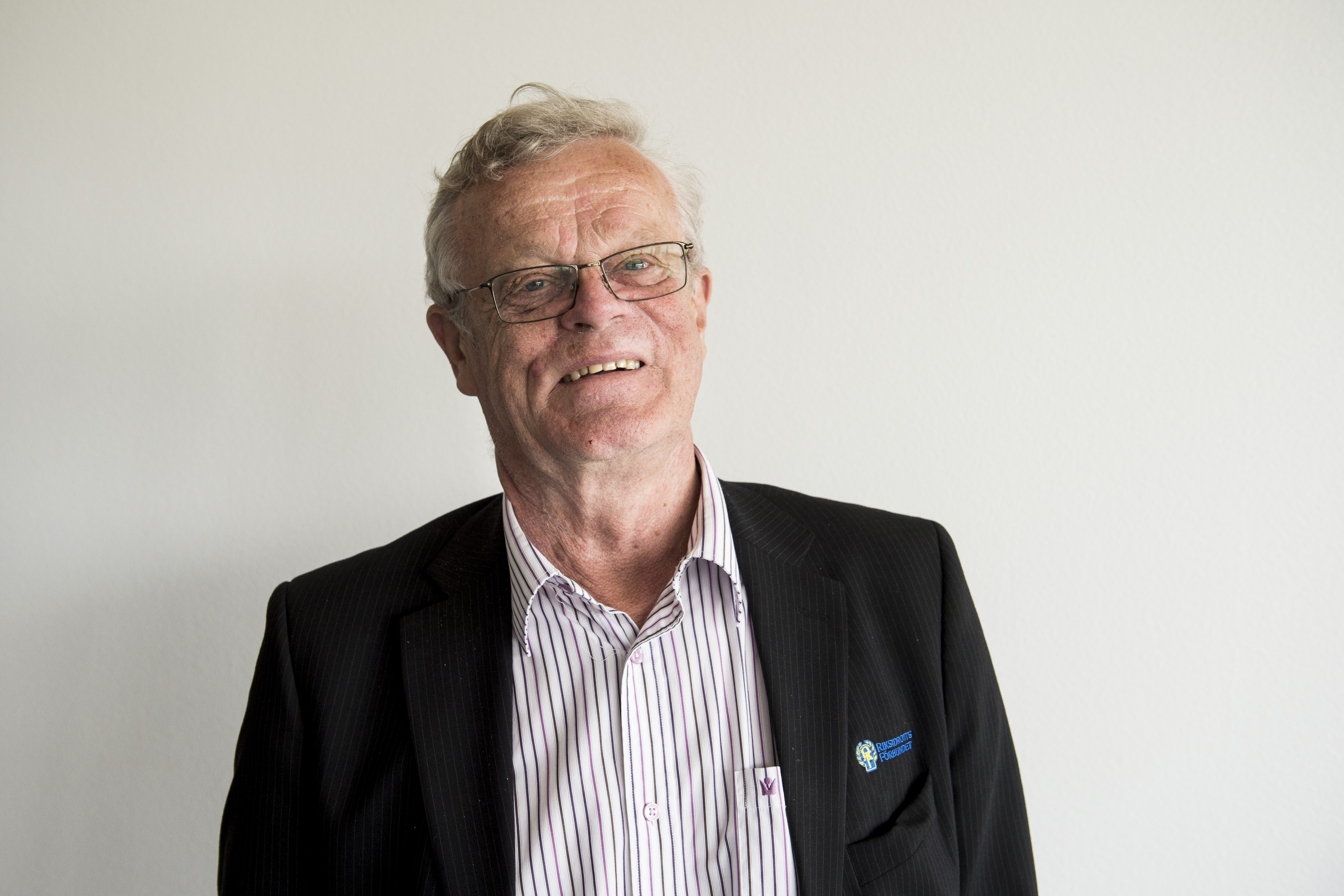
Björn Eriksson in 2015

Björn Gustaf Eriksson (born 7 December 1945) is a Swedish civil servant. A former director of the Swedish Coast Guard, the Swedish Customs Service, the Swedish police, and president of Interpol. He was, from 1996 to 31 August 2009, governor of Östergötland County, residing at the Linköping Castle.

== Early life ==
Eriksson was born on 7 December 1945 Stockholm, Sweden, the son of CFO K-G Eriksson and his wife Aina (née From). He graduated from the Stockholm School of Economics in 1968.

== Career ==
Eriksson worked at Sparbankernas bank from 1968 to 1969. He then served at the Ministry of Finance/Ministry of Budget, as desk officer from 1969 to 1976, director from 1977 to 1981 and budget director from 1981 to 1983. He was then the General Customs Director and Head of the Swedish Customs Service and the Swedish Coast Guard from 1983 to 1988. In 1988 Eriksson was appointed to the chair of the World Customs Organization. Eriksson served as the National Police Commissioner from 1988 to 1996 and chairman of the National Society for Road Safety from 1993. Eriksson was also vice president of Interpol from 1992 to 1994 and president from 1994 to 1996, after which he was appointed its first honorary president; he retains that title today. In 1996, Eriksson published Björnkramar with anecdotes from his time with the International Criminal Police Organization (Interpol).

Eriksson served as Governor of Östergötland County from 1996 to 2009. As governor, he was voted Linköping resident of the year in 2005, and as the Östergötland resident of the year in 1998, in a poll organized by Radio Östergötland. Eriksson has been a driving force in efforts to establish a center for research on economic crime and supported the Tema genus and research on Bridget of Sweden. He has also supported Linköping University and was conferred with an honorary Doctor of Philosophy degree in the spring of 2006. During his time as county governor, Eriksson annually invited Östergötland residents to song and theater performances at Linköping Castle, where he participated as an actor sometimes alternating as a bun baking and coffee serving host. His wife Helena Eriksson was artistic director of the performances. The town of Rimforsa, Kinda Municipality has a street named after Eriksson.

After Eriksson's resignation as governor, he ran the company Björn E Consulting, where he was engaged to give lectures on various subjects. In 2009-2010 he was the government's coordinator for the reception of unaccompanied asylum-seeking children. Since 2011, Eriksson has been a member of the board of the Swedish Sports Confederation, and was elected chairman in 2015. He was also chairman of the Swedish Biathlon Federation 2001-2011, and is now on the same union's Advisory Board and the Advisory Board for the security company BRM. Eriksson is a board member of the Martial Arts Delegation (Kampsportsdelegationen), Vätternrundan International, the Development Committee of the Swedish Biathlon Federation, and the Säkerhetsbranschen's training organization Bya. Since 2013 Eriksson has been the chairman of the private security industry's trade association. Eriksson was previously on the board of Gunnebo Group, AIK, Falcon Brewery and Stjärnurmakarna. Eriksson is chairman of the Årets nybyggare ("Settler of the Year"), ED Bygger Drömmar, Stenhammar Foundation, Äldreforskningen vid Linköpings universitet ("Older research at Linköping University"), Yump and the Stiftelsen Sveriges Modernaste Myndighet ("Sweden's Most Modern Authority Foundation").

In 2013 Eriksson became chairman of the board of the Swedish School of Sport and Health Sciences and the trade association Säkerhetsbranschen. 2014-2015 was Eriksson Chairman of the Swedish Athletics Association.

Björn Eriksson was the government's national coordinator on sports-related violence between 2011-2013. In April 2013, he presented the report "Less Violence for Money" (Mindre våld för pengarna), and the following year presented the final report "More Joy For the Money" (Mer glädje för pengarna). He has previously proposed including a tightening of the refusal of access which enables the banning of hooligans, as well as a masking ban for those attending sports arenas. For his work as national coordinator against sports violence Eriksson was named 2013 Security Ambassador by the magazine SecurityUser.com think tank Säkerhet för Näringsliv och Samhälle (SNOS).

Eriksson worked in 2015 as leader of Cash Uprising (Kontantupproret), a movement that wants to see cash as a means of payment in the future.

Eriksson was elected chairman of the Swedish Sports Confederation, Riksidrottsstyrelsen and the Svenska Idrottsrörelsens Studieförbund on 31 May 2015.

== Personal life ==
In 1970, he married Helena Bergström, an editor.

== Awards and decorations ==
- (Portugal) Grand Cross of the Order of Prince Henry (15 May 1991)

Civic offices
Preceded by Lennart Eriksson	Director-General of Swedish Customs Service; 1983–1988	Succeeded by Ulf Larsson
Preceded by Nils Erik Åhmansson	National Police Commissioner; 1988–1996	Succeeded by Sten Heckscher
Preceded by Norman Inkster	President of Interpol; 1994–1996	Succeeded by Toshinori Kanemoto
Preceded by Rolf Wirtén	Governor of Östergötland County; 1996–2009	Succeeded by Magnus Holgersson (acting)
