= Philip Guarino =

Philip A. Guarino (died November 10, 1993) was an American Roman Catholic priest and restaurateur who was active in Republican Party politics for many years. A resident of Italy during the dictatorship of Benito Mussolini, he was later a long-time associate of Italian neo-Fascist political activists.

== Biography ==
Guarino was born in West Winfield, Pennsylvania, and graduated from Boston College in 1931. Guarino later lived in Italy where he graduated from theology school and was ordained a Catholic priest. He moved to Washington, D.C., in 1945, and opened Phil's Italian Restaurant. He was a long time friend of Michele Sindona, Paul Peter Rao, Frank Stella and Licio Gelli. He later left the priesthood, and in 1973, Guarino "introduced himself as a leader of an OSMTJ Priory in the U.S." In the same year he also married Sarah H. Guarino.

After moving to Washington, DC, Guarino became active in politics. In all he met or served four US Presidents on Italian-American or Republican committees: Richard Nixon, Gerald Ford, Ronald Reagan and George H. W. Bush. He was invited to various state dinners and served on Bush's campaign committee.

Prior to Michele Sindona's arrest and conviction in 1980, Guarino is alleged to have "coordinated" efforts to save him. It has been claimed that Guarino was linked to the U.S. Secret Service and Cosa Nostra, and on behalf of those organizations, was trying to rehabilitate Sindona.

After his involvement in politics, he became an active member of various hospitality industry trade associations. He died on November 10, 1993, at the age of 86.

== P2 controversy ==
In 1988, the Washington Jewish Week published an article suggesting that several members of George H. W. Bush's "ethnic coalition", including Philip Guarino, had ties to various anti-Semitic, neo-Nazi and fascist groups. Six members of the ethnic coalition resigned from the campaign, including Guarino. Bush defended Guarino and several others, insisting they were "honorable men". The Anti-Defamation League, though, suggested the Republican Party had not adequately investigated the allegations.

During his career, Guarino was accused several times of having ties to various Italian fascist organisations and was accused of being a member of Licio Gelli's P2 Masonic Lodge. P2 members Gelli and the head of the secret service Pietro Musumeci were condemned for attempting to mislead the police investigation of the Bologna massacre on 2 August 1980, which killed 85 people and wounded more than 200.

The Italian Parliamentary Commission of Inquiry concluded that the P2 lodge was a secret criminal organization. Allegations of surreptitious international relationships, and with some people suspected of affiliation with the American Central Intelligence Agency were also partly confirmed. Though Guarino was open about knowing Gelli, he emphatically denied ever being part of the P2 Lodge - a denial repeated by Bush's campaign team. When the Italian police investigated P2, they found that Guarino was regularly corresponding with Gelli. According to the Italian Parliamentary Commission of Inquiry, Guarino was the American "correspondent" of the P2 Lodge. Guarino also hosted Licio Gelli at Reagan's 1981 Inauguration, introducing him to distinguished guests.

== Appointments ==
Guarino's appointments:

- Vice-chairman of the Ethnic Outreach Committee for the George H. W. Bush Campaign.
- Director of the Senior Citizens Division of the National Republican Committee.
- Member of John Connally's Committee on the Defense of the Mediterranean.
- Co-founder and a Director of the District of Columbia National Bank (now part of NationsBank).
- Treasurer of the National Licensed Beverage Association.
- Elected to the Vice Chairmanship of the Republican Heritage groups (1971–1975).
- Deputy Directory of the Speaker's Bureau, Washington DC.
