= Carl Persson =

Swedish jurist and politician

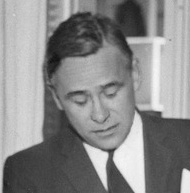

President of Interpol
- In office 1976–1980
- Secretary-General: Jean Népote; André Bossard
- Preceded by: William Higgitt
- Succeeded by: Jolly Bugarin

Governor of Gothenburg and Bohus County
- In office 1979–1980
- Preceded by: Erik Huss
- Succeeded by: Åke Norling

Governor of Halland County
- In office 1978–1979
- Preceded by: Yngve Holmberg
- Succeeded by: Johannes Antonsson

National Police Commissioner
- In office 1964–1978
- Preceded by: None
- Succeeded by: Holger Romander

Personal details
- Born: Carl Johan Gunnar Persson; 14 December 1919 Kvidinge, Sweden
- Died: 6 November 2014 (aged 94) Danderyd, Sweden
- Spouse: Kerstin "Titti" Holmdahl (m. 1943)
- Children: 4
- Education: Lund University
- Profession: Jurist

Carl Johan Gunnar Persson (14 December 1919 – 6 November 2014) was a Swedish jurist and politician. Persson served as the National Police Commissioner of the Swedish Police Authority from 1964 to 1978. His highest profile investigations during his tenure as National Police Commissioner included the hijacking of Scandinavian Airlines System Flight 130 to Bulltofta Airport in 1972, the Norrmalmstorg robbery in 1973, and the West German Embassy siege by the Red Army Faction in 1975. Persson also served as the president of the Interpol from 1976 to 1980 and as Governor of Halland County from 1978 to 1979 and the Governor of the former county of Gothenburg and Bohus from 1979 to 1980.

== Early life ==
Persson was born on 14 December 1919 in Kvidinge, Kristianstad County, Sweden, the son of captain Carl Johan Persson and his wife Anni (née Vallin). He passed studentexamen in Helsingborg in 1938 and received a Candidate of Law degree from Lund University in 1942.

== Career ==
Persson did his clerkship in Södra Åsbo and Bjäre Judicial District from 1942 to 1945, and became a Legal Clerk in Scania and Blekinge Court of Appeal in 1945. Persson served as a tingsrätt secretary in the Södra Åsbo and Bjäre Judicial District from 1948 to 1949 (acting in 1947) and as an assessor in 1951. He became hovrättsråd in 1961.

Persson was notary and secretary in Second Law Committee of the Riksdag from 1949 to 1952, and an expert in the Ministry of Justice in 1954, and in the Ministry of the Interior from 1954 to 1955. Persson was head of the lagbyrå in the Ministry of the Interior in 1955 and became head of the Legal Department in 1957. He was State Secretary from 1958 to 1964 and then served as National Police Commissioner and head of the Swedish National Police Board from 1964 to 1978. Persson also served as president of the Interpol from 1976 to 1980 and then as Governor of Halland County in 1978, as well as Governor of Gothenburg and Bohus County from 1979 to 1980.

He was a member of the International Health Care Affairs Committee from 1958, a delegate of the World Health Organization in 1959 and 1961, and chair of the Nordic Commission on the common labor market for doctors and dentists from 1958 to 1962. Persson was chairman of the Mental Health Care Council (Mentalsjukvårdsberedningen) 1959–1962, the organization of body and mental health care in Östergötland County from 1962 to 1964, the City of Gothenburg merging with the Gothenburg and Bohus County's county council from 1962 to 1970, the Organizing Committee of the Bailiffs System (Exekutionsväsendets organisationsnämnd) from 1964 to 1969 and the investigation of the headship of the Karolinska Hospital in 1978.

Furthermore, Persson was chairman of the natural resource delegation of the Coordinating Board of the Swedish Research Councils (Forskningsrådsnämndens naturresursdelegation), Emergency Services Commission (Räddningstjänstkommissionen), the Theft Investigation, National Bacteriological Laboratory (Statens bakteriologiska laboratorium) Investigation, the Investigation of Nuclear Power Preparedness from 1987 to 1989, the Delegation for Patient Transport by Helicopter from 1989 to 1991, chairman of the Committee for Teaching of the hospital's Expansion from 1981 to 1990 and the Disaster Commission (Katastrofkommissionen) from 1982 to 1990. Persson was also chairman of the board of Kabi-Vitrum, Kabi Gen, Cea, and ABAB from 1970 to 1985. He was vice chairman of Gota Finans from 1985 to 1989, chairman of the Swedish Carnegie Institute from 1982 and consultant in the Swedish-Soviet working group for investigations of Raoul Wallenberg from 1991.

He published his memoirs, Utan omsvep ("Head-on") in 1990.

== Personal life ==
In 1943, he married Kerstin "Titti" Holmdahl (1919–2015), the daughter of chief physician Carl Holmdahl and Ida (née Björck). He had four children, including Ingrid (born 1944).

== Death ==
Persson died on 6 November 2014, at the age of 94. He is buried at Djursholm's Cemetery.

== Bibliography ==
- Persson, Carl G.; Sundelin, Anders (1990). Utan omsvep: ett liv i maktens centrum [Without further ado: a life at the center of power] (in Swedish). Stockholm: Norstedt. ISBN 91-1-893462-5. SELIBR 7155256.
- Persson, Carl G.; Sundelin, Anders (1991). Utan omsvep: ett liv i maktens centrum [Without further ado: a life at the center of power] (in Swedish) (New ed.). Stockholm: PAN/Norstedt. ISBN 91-1-919101-4. SELIBR 7156024.

Civic offices
Preceded by None	National Police Commissioner; 1964–1978	Succeeded by Holger Romander
Preceded by William Higgitt	President of Interpol; 1976–1980	Succeeded by Jolly Bugarin
Preceded by Yngve Holmberg	Governor of Halland County; 1978–1979	Succeeded by Johannes Antonsson
Preceded by Erik Huss	Governor of Gothenburg and Bohus County; 1979–1980	Succeeded by Åke Norling
