= Ebbe Carlsson affair =

1988 political scandal in Sweden

The Ebbe Carlsson affair (Swedish: Ebbe Carlsson-affären) was a major political scandal in Sweden occurring during mid-1988. The affair came to public knowledge on 1 June 1988, when the evening newspaper Expressen revealed that Ebbe Carlsson, a journalist and publisher and former secretary at the Swedish government, was carrying out an independent and illegal investigation into the assassination of prime minister Olof Palme, secretly supported by the minister for justice Anna-Greta Leijon.

The scandal forced Leijon to resign a week later, and was finally concluded with Carlsson, by then dying with AIDS, being fined for smuggling in 1992. Long before it landed in criminal court, however, an investigation of his role was launched by the constitutional committee of the parliament, its hearings broadcast live on Sveriges Television, the public television service. The matter became embarrassing to the government, appearing to expose an "old boys culture" encompassing people both in the senior ranks of the Social Democratic Party and in the police, and careless handling in highly sensitive police work.

== Background ==
In late 1987, prime minister Ingvar Carlsson summoned Carl Lidbom, the Swedish ambassador to France, to Stockholm. He wanted Lidbom to lead an investigation into the procedures of SÄPO, the Swedish security police. This was prompted by the escape of convicted spy Stig Bergling as well as the failure to find the assassin of former prime minister Olof Palme.

== Course of events ==
Lidbom consulted his old acquaintance Ebbe Carlsson. The two had known each other since the early 1970s when they had both worked at the Department of Justice. Ebbe Carlsson had both knowledge and connections relating to SÄPO, and started up his own investigation, backed by the National Police Commissioner Nils Erik Åhmansson who provided Carlsson with a bodyguard and additional collaborators within SÄPO.

Ebbe Carlsson concluded that Olof Palme had been assassinated by the Kurdish organisation PKK and claimed that:

- SÄPO could have prevented the murder through telephone tapping of Kurds, claiming that the SÄPO operational director had known that the PKK was planning a murder in Stockholm in February 1986 (Palme was shot dead on his way home from a cinema on the late evening of 28 February 1986).
- The PKK had been ordered to assassinate Palme by the Iranian government at a meeting in Damascus in 1985. The reason for this was supposedly that Palme had stopped the Iranians from acquiring the Swedish RBS 70 air defence missile system and that the Swedish government had listed the PKK as a terrorist organization.

Carlsson's theories were largely a rehash of the "PKK track" that had become the main path of the Palme inquiry under Hans Holmér in 1986, leading to a major police clampdown on suspected PKK people in early 1987. After prosecutors deemed the police work on the Kurds unsatisfactory and had denied further search warrants and phone tapping along those lines, Holmér stepped down as chief of the inquiry. Holmér, Lidbom, and Carlsson were long-time friends and Carlsson's theories are believed to have been inspired by Holmér.

On 17 March 1988, Anna-Greta Leijon was briefed by Lidbom about Carlsson's theories, and a few days later she also met with Carlsson himself. On 28 March, the prime minister was informed by Lidbom, who was given a deadline of 7 June to confirm Carlsson's theories.

On 2 May, Carlsson went to see Leijon to get a letter of recommendation. He intended to use this when traveling to England where his aim was to talk with a number of people whom he considered knowledgeable on the alleged meeting in Damascus. Leijon promptly wrote the letter, giving it to Carlsson two days later. A copy was placed in her safe without a registration, bypassing the correct procedure. All documents issued by or sent to a public authority in Sweden generally have to be noted, with date, in a roll of documents and by default become public, unless access has been specifically restricted. By treating the document as a private letter, Leijon was aiming to keep it hidden.

A week later Carlsson had a meeting with chief prosecutor Jörgen Almblad where he presented his theories about the PKK. Almblad was enraged as he had not been informed about Carlsson's part in the investigation prior to this meeting. He was highly critical, too, of the fact that Carlsson had been given access to various kinds of top-secret information.

Finally, on 30 May and 1 June 1988, Expressen reporter Per Wendel called Leijon and asked about Carlsson's involvement in the investigation. Leijon, among other things, denied that she had given Carlsson any letter of recommendation. Immediately after this, the letter was taken out of the safe, registered, and thereafter classified.
