= Per Wendel =

Swedish journalist (1947–2005)

Per "Pelle" Håkan Wendel (28 January 1947 – 10 October 2005) was a Swedish journalist. He worked for the Expressen newspaper from 1973 until his death. Wendel was the main investigative journalist who told about the Ebbe Carlsson affair, which forced the then Justice Minister Anna-Greta Leijon to resign. After Wendels funeral after his death from cancer in 2005, Expressen started the Per Wendel Award an annual award for investigative journalists.
