= National Police Commissioner (Sweden) =

Head of the Swedish Police Authority

National Police Commissioner of the Swedish Police Authority
- Rikspolischef
- Epaulette worn for the grade of National Police Commissioner (post-2015)
- Incumbent; Petra Lundh since 1 December 2023
- Reports to: Government of Sweden
- Seat: Polishuset, Kungsholmen, Stockholm
- Appointer: Government of Sweden
- Term length: 6 years option to extended up to 3 years
- Formation: 1965
- First holder: Carl Persson
- Deputy: Head of the National Operations Department
- Website: Official website

The National Police Commissioner of Sweden (Swedish: Rikspolischef) is the head of the Swedish Police Authority, appointed by the Government, responsible for all activities of the police. The current Commissioner is Petra Lundh, who began serving December 1, 2023.

== Role ==
The office was created with the establishment of the National Police Board and the nationalization of the Swedish police in 1965. The Commissioner is appointed by the Government for a period of six years, with an option to extend, but as a rule for no more than three years. The person holding the office must be a Swedish citizen. Beyond that, the Government has considerable latitude in the recruitment of a new Commissioner, as the only legal framework is a single article in the constitution, leaving wide room for interpretation: "Appointments to posts at administrative authorities [organized] under the Government are made by the Government [...] When making appointments to posts within the State administration, only objective factors, such as merit and competence, shall be taken into account." (Note: See the official translation of the constitution at the Riksdag website: 1974 Instrument of Government, Chapter 12, Art. 5) The government has the power to dismiss a Commissioner for "extraordinary" and serious reasons, or if it's "in the nation's best interest." The Commissioner may also be reassigned to a different post, if called for due to organizational change, but only after a court decision.

== List of National Police Commissioners ==
The current Commissioner is Petra Lundh.

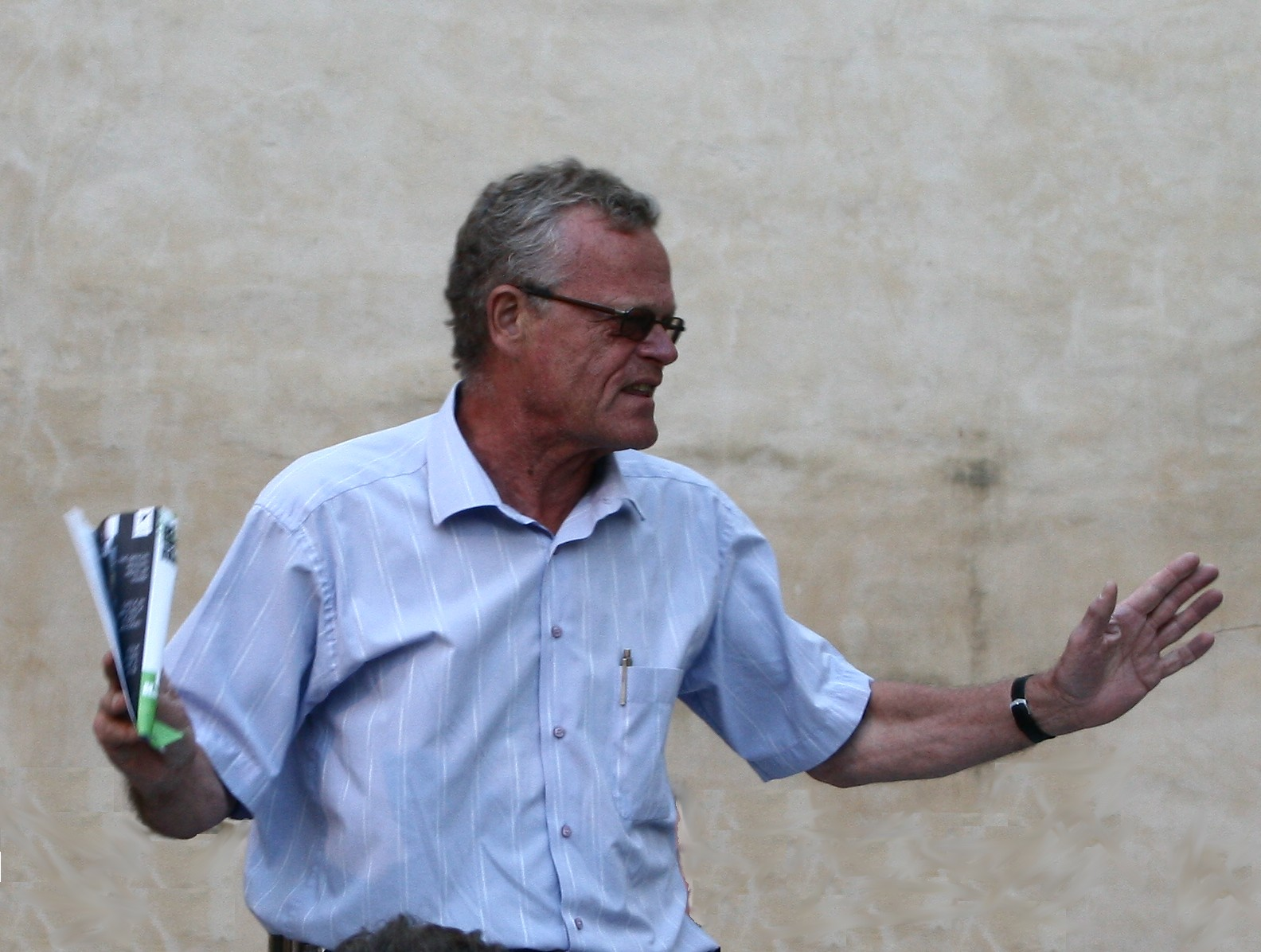
Björn Eriksson, former National Police Commissioner and President of Interpol, here pictured in 2009.

List of commissioners

The following lists commissioners in chronological order:

- 1964–1978: Carl Persson
- 1978–1987: Holger Romander
- January 1988 – October 1988: Nils Erik Åhmansson
- 1988–1996: Björn Eriksson
- 1996–2004: Sten Heckscher
- 2005–2007: Stefan Strömberg
- 2008–2014: Bengt Svenson
- 2014–2018: Dan Eliasson
- 2018–2023: Anders Thornberg
- 2023–present: Petra Lundh

== See also ==
- Prosecutor-General of Sweden
- Supreme Commander of the Swedish Armed Forces
