= Swedish National Police Board =

Swedish National Police Board Rikspolisstyrelsen
- Abbreviation: RPS

Agency overview
- Formed: 1 January 1965
- Preceding agencies: Swedish State Police; 554 municipal police authorities
- Dissolved: 1 January 2015
- Superseding agency: Swedish Police Authority

Jurisdictional structure
- National agency: Sweden
- Operations jurisdiction: Sweden
- Governing body: Riksdag
- General nature: Civilian police

Operational structure
- Headquarters: Stockholm
- Organised under the Ministry of Justice

The Swedish National Police Board (Swedish: Rikspolisstyrelsen, RPS) was the central administrative authority for the police in Sweden from 1 January 1965 to 1 January 2015, when the Swedish Police Authority was established. The Swedish police used to consist of the National Police Board and 21 local police authorities, with their geographical areas of responsibility divided along county lines. The board was led by the National Police Commissioner and its main responsibilities were administration, coordination and supervision of the Swedish police. It also acted as the superordinate authority for the National Laboratory of Forensic Science. The Swedish National Criminal Police — sometimes also referred to as the Swedish National Bureau of Investigation — used to be a constituent part of the National Police Board, together with the Swedish Security Service. The Swedish Security Service formed its own agency post-reorganisation, and most of the tasks handled by the National Criminal Police have been taken over by the National Operations Department.

== History ==
The Swedish National Police Board was established on 1 January 1965, together with 119 local police authorities, each led by a District Police Commissioner, answering to a Chief Commissioner at the County Administrative Board. This was soon reduced to 118 local police authorities, and in 1998 the number of districts were even further reduced to just 21—one in each county. Prior to the nationalization in 1965, the Swedish police used to consist of a State Police (statspolisen) and 554 municipal police authorities; less than 30 per cent of these districts had more than 10 police officers. This arrangement was considered inefficient by members of the Riksdag, and is what prompted the original reform.

The following is a brief summary of how each authority or department under the National Police Board was organised, their responsibilities, what preceded them, and what followed in 2015:

=== National Laboratory of Forensic Science ===
The National Swedish Laboratory of Forensic Science (Statens kriminaltekniska laboratorium, abbreviated SKL) was formed with the establishment of the National Police Board and provided forensic analysis — primarily for the police, but also offered assistance to other government agencies and organisations. Its mission has remained the same, but the arrangement with the National Police Board was terminated in 2015, and instead transferred to the Swedish Police Authority, under a new name. Prior to 1965, the forensics tasks where handled by the National Swedish Criminal Police Registry and Forensic Laboratories (Statens kriminaltekniska anstalt, SKA), which was formed on 1 October 1939.

=== National Criminal Police ===
The National Criminal Police (Rikskriminalpolisen, abbreviated RKP) was part of the National Police Board. It was led by the Commissioner of the National Criminal Police, who reported directly to the National Police Commissioner. Its role was to provide guidance, expertise and assistance to the local police authorities, and primarily to fight organised crime on the national and international level. It was also responsible for the coordination of police efforts in times of a crisis. The National Criminal Police was organised into five departments and several units:

- Criminal Intelligence and Investigation Division (Kriminalpolisenheten)
  - Surveillance Unit (Spaningssektionen)
  - Criminal Intelligence Unit (Underrättelsesektionen)
  - Cyber Crime Unit (IT-brottssektionen)
  - Criminal Investigations Unit (Utredningssektionen)
  - Financial Intelligence Unit, FIU (Finanspolisen)
  - Special Operations Unit (Sektionen för särskilda insatser, SSI)
- Special Operations Division (Ordningspolisenheten)
  - Air Support Unit (Polisflyget)
  - National Task Force (Nationella insatsstyrkan)
  - National Communications Centre (Rikskommunikationscentralen)
  - Peace Support Operations (Polisens utlandssektion)
  - Swedish Police Dog Centre (Polishundtjänsten)
  - Special Task Unit (Ordningspolisiära frågor)
- International Police Cooperation Division (Enheten för internationellt polissammarbete)
  - International Unit (Internationella sektionen)
  - Liaison Officers Unit (Sambandsmannasektionen)
- Central Border Police Division (Centrala gränskontrollenheten)
- Chief of Staff's Office (Staben)

Following the reorganisation in 2015, most of the tasks previously handled by the National Criminal Police have been transferred to the National Operations Department.

=== Swedish Security Service ===
In 1965, as the National Police Board was established, a special police operations section "for the prevention and detection of crimes against national security" was created along with it. In 1989, this section became more independent, with its own Director-General, and changed its name to the Swedish Security Service (Säkerhetspolisen). It remained formally organised under the board until 1 January 2015, when it formed its own agency.

=== County police authorities ===
When the National Police Board was established in 1965, the number of police districts in Sweden were reduced from 554 to 119 (then to 118). In 1998, the number of districts were further reduced to 21, dividing the Swedish police along its county lines. Each police authority was headed by a County Police Commissioner (länspolismästare) and a Police Board (polisstyrelse). The Commissioner and members of the board were appointed by the Government. Board members had to be local residents and preferably experienced in matters relating to municipal services.

Following the reorganisation in 2015, the Swedish police divided into seven police regions.

== See also ==
- Swedish Police Authority
- Swedish Security Service
