= Hans Holmér =

Swedish civil servant and author

- Born: Hans Gillis Åke Holmér; 28 December 1930; Stockholm, Sweden
- Died: 4 October 2002 (aged 71); Trelleborg, Sweden
- Occupation(s): Civil servant, author
- Known for: Investigation of the assassination of Olof Palme
- Father: Gösta Holmér

Hans Gillis Åke Holmér (28 December 1930 – 4 October 2002) was a Swedish civil servant and author. Holmér served as Chief of the Swedish Security Service (SÄPO) and later Chief Commissioner (länspolismästare) of Stockholm County. He became well known during his tenure, spanning barely a year, as Chief of the special investigation unit into the assassination of the Swedish Prime Minister Olof Palme (1986–1987). Holmér was commonly associated with the Swedish Social Democratic Party and was known to have good connections within its top ranks.

== Early life ==
Holmér was born on 28 December 1930 in Stockholm, Sweden, the son of Gösta Holmér, a national sports instructor, and his wife Aslög (née Roos). He was younger brother of Gustaf Holmér (1921–2004), professor of Romance languages, especially French. Hans Holmér studied at Norra Latin and passed studentexamen in 1950. The same year he did military service at the Army Ranger School in Kiruna, where he also underwent cadet training and later became a captain.

== Career ==
Holmér attended a police management course between 1955 and 1956, and served as deputy district police superintendent (landsfiskal) etc in Stockholm County from 1956 to 1962. He received a Candidate of Law degree in Stockholm in 1962, and did his clerkship from 1963 to 1964. Holmér then served as public prosecutor (kammaråklagare) in Stockholm in 1965. He worked as director (byråchef) at the Swedish National Police Board from 1966 to 1970 when he was appointed head of the Department of Security in the National Police Board (from 1989 known as the Swedish Security Service). He became District Police Commissioner of Stockholm in 1976 and Chief Commissioner of Stockholm County in 1984.

After the assassination of Palme, Hans Holmér, then the Chief Commissioner of Stockholm County police, personally took charge of the investigations (and without actually being designated as such, which would lead to later accusations of a breach in operative routines). Holmér assumed that the murder was of a political nature, but not related to the domestic political scene. No analysis was ever made of whether the deceased PM's political positions could have created motives to kill him, either from within the Swedish political scene or on the part of foreign governments or secret agencies. Instead, Holmér proposed to look for the assassins within certain immigrant groups living in Sweden, notably the Kurds. A Palme task force with a special Palme office were set up. Holmér particularly focused on the assumption that the Kurdish paramilitary PKK might have been behind the assassination. In the fall of 1986, a great number of search warrants were issued to follow the activities of a number of Kurds living in Sweden. Many people with presumed PKK connections were arrested – only to be released shortly afterwards due to lack of solid evidence.

During press briefings up to this point, Holmér had insisted, with considerable panache, that the investigations were making steady progress and that, before too long, the crime would be solved. After the raid on the PKK, things backfired. Although the hunt suddenly turned into failure, Holmér demanded further investigations along the same lines. This rapidly created a rupture between Holmér and the prosecutors who were critical of him for not respecting the demands of the law in making searches and arrests (they were also getting support from the media, now turning against the mesmerizing police chief). At this point, Holmér resigned from the investigations in February 1987. He would continue to follow the Kurds track, though, outside of the formal police inquiry, resulting, in 1988, the sensational Ebbe Carlsson affair.

== Later life ==
Holmér spent the remainder of his life writing crime novels; he was also appointed to a UN-related police job in Vienna, overseeing the countering of drug trafficking. In one of his books, Olof Palme är skjuten! ("Olof Palme has been shot!"), Holmér describes his experiences leading the special investigation unit and goes on to blame the prosecution for the failure of the investigation. Holmér, on the other hand, has been strongly criticized by later commissions looking into the conduct of the investigations and also by journalists and independent investigators, owing to his singleminded pursuit of the Kurds track, the neglect of other leads, as well as for his use of photofit images of the suspected killer and his insistence that Palme was shot with a Smith & Wesson .357 Magnum gun (brandishing that model during an early press briefing) which is considered to have locked the investigations of possible weapons onto that model only for many years after.

Fringe conspiracy theorists have occasionally claimed that Holmér had engaged in deception about his movements on the night of the assassination – the generally accepted view is that he got the news in the morning, hundreds of miles out of Stockholm, having driven up to Dalarna to take part in the cross-country skiing race, Vasaloppet, and then got into his car and turned back towards Stockholm at high speed. These theorists hint, without evidence, that he, with other policemen, were involved in the murder plot.

The Chief of the Secret Police in The Terrorists (1975) by Maj Sjöwall and Per Wahlöö, the final book in the Martin Beck mystery series, is modelled on Holmér; though the character remains nameless, references to his pronounced ears and the contempt in which he is held by many people on the political left (referring to the aftermath of the IB affair) give it away. Ironically, due to an oversight by one of the other police bureaucrats in the book, Olof Palme is killed by a completely inexperienced young girl, acting in desperate protest. Holmér, of course, would go on to lead the investigation after the actual Palme assassination a decade later.

== Death ==
Hans Holmér died in his home in Skåne, Sweden on Friday, 4 October 2002.

Civic offices
Preceded by P.G. Vinge	Chief of the Swedish Security Service; 1970–1976	Succeeded by Sven-Åke Hjälmroth
Preceded by Kurt Lindroth	District Police Commissioner of Stockholm; 1976–1984	Succeeded by None
Preceded by None	Chief Commissioner of Stockholm; 1984–1987	Succeeded by Sven-Åke Hjälmroth
Sporting positions
Preceded by Arne Ljungqvist	Chairman of the Swedish Athletics Association; 1981–1985	Succeeded by Folke Englund
Sporting positions
Preceded by ?	Chairman of the Swedish Bobsleighing and Tobogganing Association; 1993–2002	Succeeded by Björn Bergström
