= Svante Lindqvist =

Swedish historian (born 1948)

His Excellency Svante Lindqvist
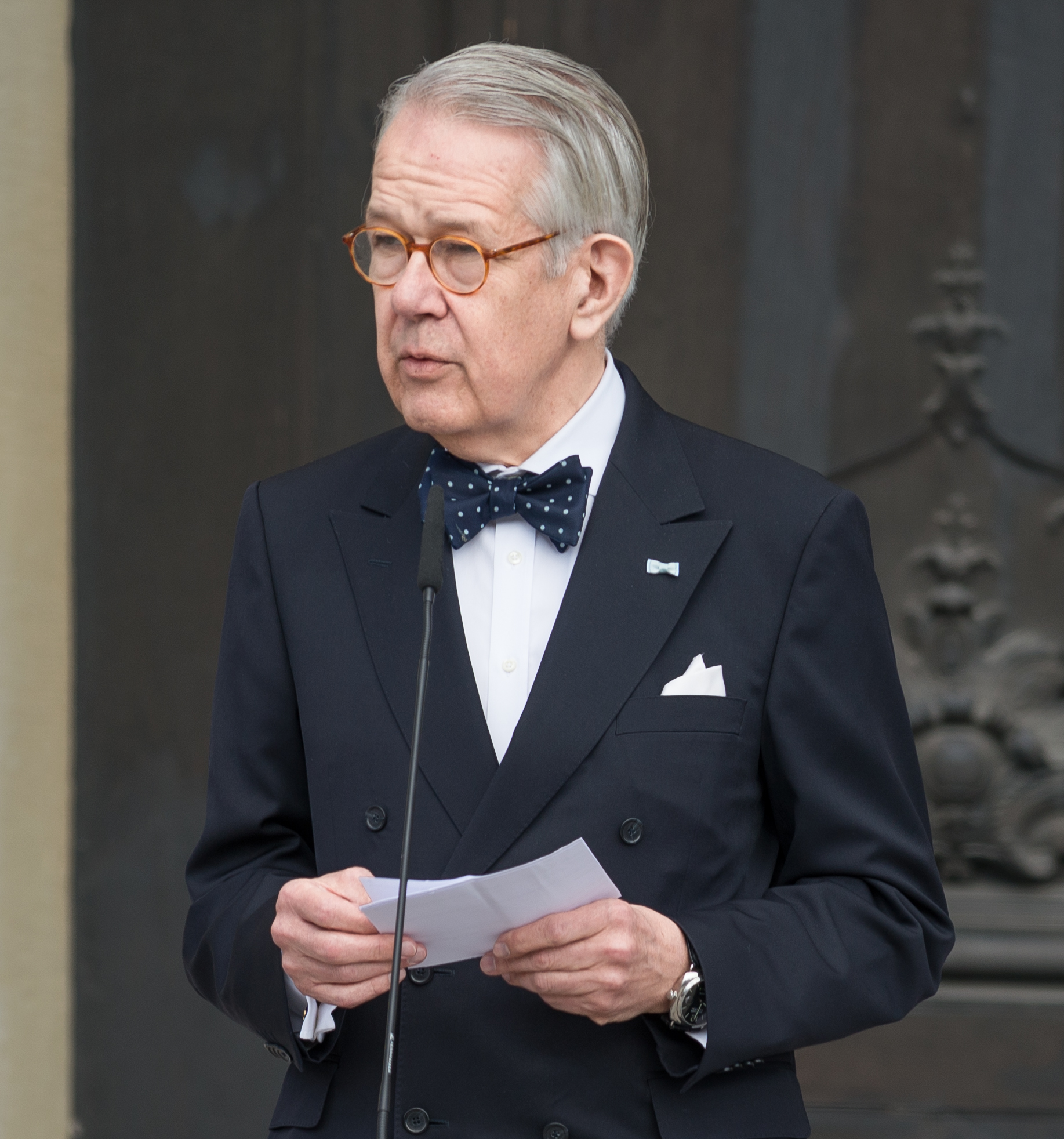
- Lindqvist in 2017

Marshal of the Realm of Sweden
- In office 1 January 2010 – 30 August 2018
- Monarch: Carl XVI Gustaf
- Preceded by: Ingemar Eliasson
- Succeeded by: Fredrik Wersäll

Personal details
- Born: Lars Svante Albert Lindqvist; 26 April 1948 (age 78) Stockholm, Sweden
- Spouse: Catharina Lindqvist
- Education: Royal Institute of Technology

Lars Svante Albert Lindqvist (born 26 April 1948) is a Swedish historian who was the Marshal of the Realm of Sweden and chief of the Royal Court of Sweden from 1 January 2010 until 30 August 2018. Since 1 September 2018 he is appointed Chancellor of the Royal Orders of Knighthood, the chancery overseeing the Orders, decorations, and medals of Sweden.

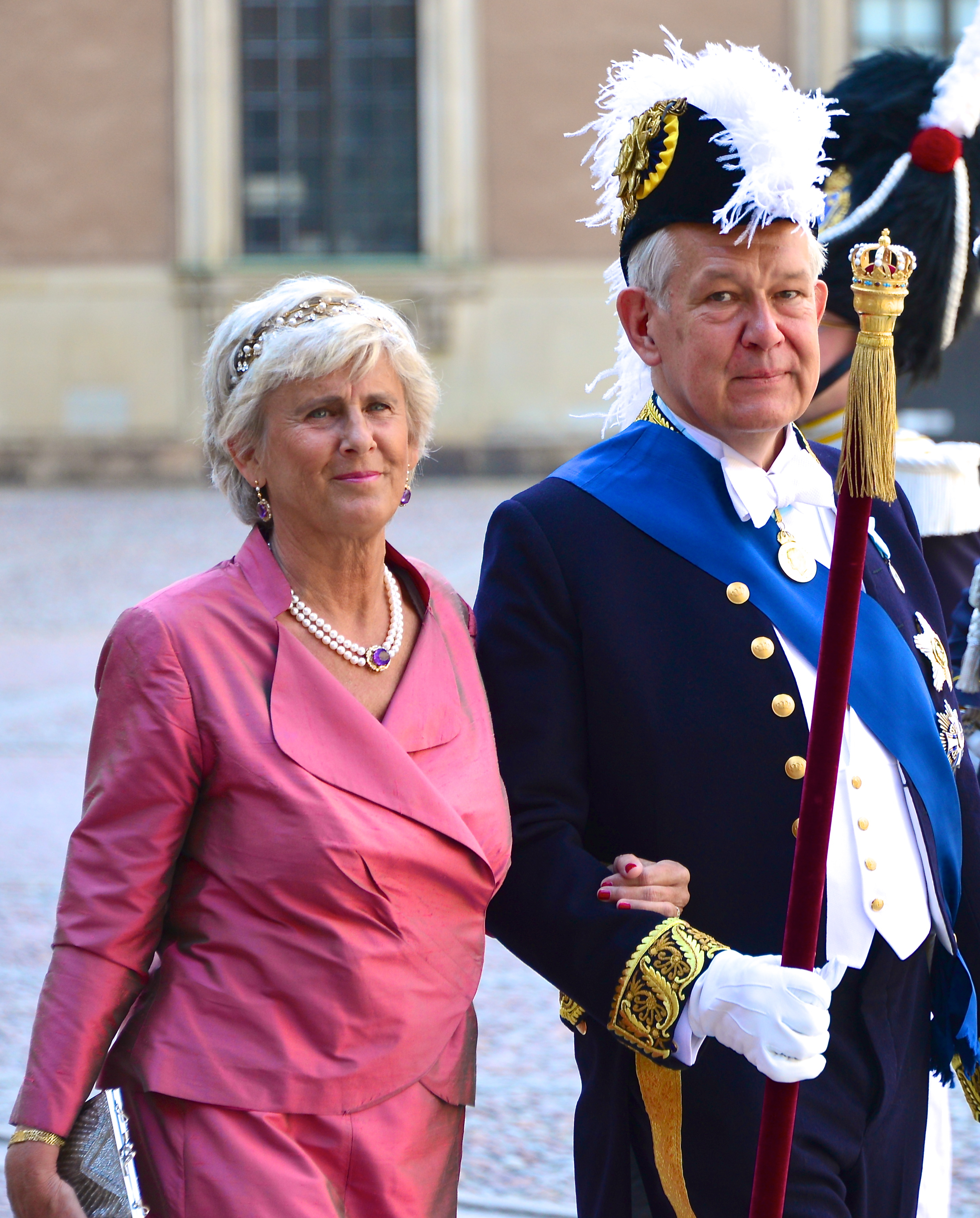
Svante Lindqvist with wife Catharina prior to the wedding of Princess Madeleine and Christopher O'Neill on 8 June 2013.

== Biography ==
Lindqvist is the son of architect Åke E. Lindqvist and Barbro Åström. He holds an MSE in engineering physics from the Royal Institute of Technology since 1977. After contact with Torsten Althin, he had written a thesis with focus on historical technology. He holds a Ph.D. in science and ideas history from Uppsala University since 1984. His doctoral dissertation was about the introduction of the steam engine in Sweden in the early 18th century.

Lindqvist later became a professor of art history at the Royal Institute of Technology, but left in 1998 to become head of the Nobel Museum, which was inaugurated in 2001.

Lindqvist is a member of the Royal Swedish Academy of Engineering Sciences since 1992, the Royal Swedish Academy of Sciences (KVA) since 1994, the Royal Swedish Academy of Letters, History and Antiquities since 2002, and the American Philosophical Society since 2013.

On 1 July 2009 he was appointed the KVA's praeses, for a three-year term. He was succeeded by Barbara Cannon on 1 July 2012.

== Distinctions ==
- (Sweden) H. M. The King's Medal of the 12th size in the Order of the Seraphim ribbon (Kong: sGM12mserafb) "for significant contributions in the museum sector and in the subject of technology history," on 28 January 2010.
- (Estonia) Member 1st Class of Order of the Cross of Terra Mariana (EPTMk1kl) in connection with the Estonian state visit on 18 January 2011.
- Italy Knight Grand Cross of the Order of Merit of the Italian Republic (14 January 2019)

Court offices
Preceded by Ingemar Eliasson	Marshal of the Realm of Sweden; 2010–2018	Succeeded by Fredrik Wersäll
Order of precedence
Preceded by Ingemar Eliasson as former Marshal of the Realm	Swedish order of precedence as former Marshal of the Realm	Succeeded by Fredrik Wersäll as former Marshal of the Realm
