= Stanislaw Gonerka =

Polish serial killer

- Born: 7 June 1927; Poland
- Died: 20 February 1987 (aged 59); Stockholm, Sweden
- Resting place: Botkyrka Cemetery
- Other name: Slaktaren ("The Butcher")
- Citizenship: Swedish (1972)
- Occupation: Butcher
- Known for: Suspect of the murder of Catrine da Costa
- Convictions: 1974: Aggravated assault; causing of death by negligence; 1977: Murder
- Penalty: Institutional psychiatric care

Details
- Victims: 3
- Date: 22 August 1974 and 12 August 1977
- Country: Sweden
- Location: Scania

Stanislaw Gonerka (7 June 1927 – 20 February 1987) was a Polish man convicted of three murders in Sweden. He was known in the media as Slaktaren ("The Butcher"). Born in Poland in 1927, he had a difficult childhood, including forced labor during Nazi occupation. He trained as a butcher and worked as a police officer. In 1958, he moved to Sweden, where he was convicted of crimes like theft and drunk driving, leading to his deportation in 1962. He returned in 1972 and later brutally murdered Wanda Radosz in 1974, dismembering her body. Gonerka was arrested after police discovered body parts in a container and he confessed, although he initially claimed the death was an accident. In 1975, he was sentenced to psychiatric care for aggravated assault and causing of death by negligence.

Gonerka was involved in another double murder in 1977, killing Rut Norinder and Artur Andersson in Ystad. He was remanded to psychiatric care after being arrested, but a few years later, in 1983, he was released. In 1984, the dismembered body of Catrine da Costa was found, and Gonerka became a suspect, though he denied involvement. Despite suspicions, his DNA was never obtained or analyzed in connection with the case. Over the years, his name resurfaced in investigations but he was never fully pursued. Gonerka died in 1987, and later investigations linked him to the da Costa case, but no conclusive forensic evidence was ever gathered. The case remained open, but no concrete conclusions were reached before the statute of limitations expired in 2009.

== Early life ==
Stanislaw Gonerka was born on 7 June 1927, in Poland. He had a very difficult childhood and, as a teenager, was forced to work for a German farmer under the conditions of forced labor in Nazi-occupied Poland. From 1944 to 1945, Gonerka was held in the Leslau labor camp in Poland. In his twenties, he trained as a master butcher. Before that, he worked as a police officer and claimed to have witnessed the torture of detainees. Whether he personally took part in the torture is not clear from the police interrogations conducted with him in the 1970s.

== Move to Sweden ==
In 1958, Gonerka moved to Sweden. While working as a butcher, he was convicted of several crimes, including aggravated theft and drunk driving. He was deported to Poland in 1962.

In 1972, he returned to Sweden and became a Swedish citizen. That same year, Gonerka robbed and brutally assaulted an elderly man in Helsingborg. He used a rubber baton as a weapon, striking the man multiple times on the head. Gonerka was sentenced to two years and eight months in prison for the robbery and associated check fraud offenses. A 1973 psychological evaluation noted that he "surely has the ability to deceive" and described him as "generally unreliable."

In the autumn of 1974, Gonerka was released from prison. During his incarceration, he had met a woman through a personal ad.

== 1974 Malmö murder ==
Murder of Wanda Radosz
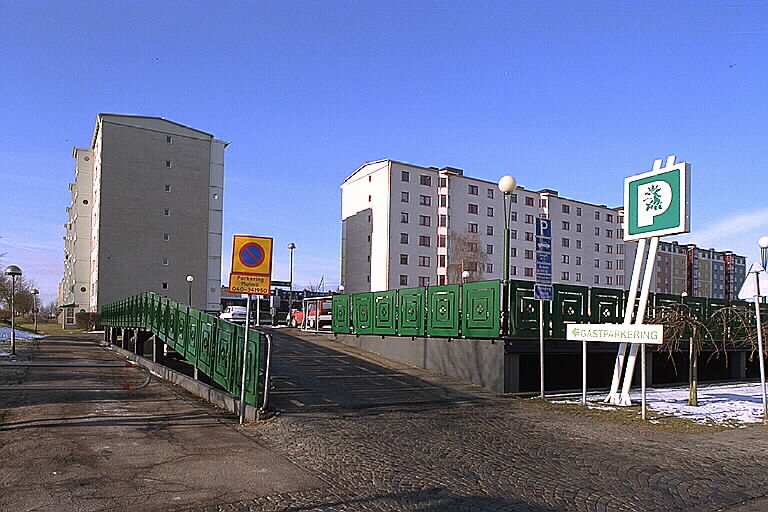
- The residential area Holma in Hyllie, Malmö, where the murder occurred
- Location: 55.57296°N 12.98674°E; Hyacintgatan 4, Holma, Malmö, Sweden
- Date: 22 August 1974 (CEST)
- Target: Wanda Radosz
- Attack type: Dismemberment
- Deaths: 1
- Victim: 1
- Perpetrator: Stanislaw Gonerka
- Verdict: Guilty
- Convictions: Aggravated assault and causing of death by negligence
- Sentence: Institutional psychiatric care

=== Events ===
On 22 August 1974, 38-year-old Wanda Radosz (born 14 February 1936, in Poland) was murdered at Hyacintgatan 4 in the Holma residential area of the Hyllie district in Malmö. After visiting a dance restaurant, the 47-year-old Stanislaw Gonerka killed Radosz and subsequently dismembered her body.

On the afternoon of 24 August, some children playing near a garbage container at Sorgenfrivägen 47 in Östra Sorgenfri, Malmö, discovered two human thighs wrapped in plastic. The day before, several children had claimed to have found body parts in the container, but their parents dismissed their accounts. Eventually, some parents became suspicious and contacted the police at around 3:30 PM. The package containing the body parts was bloody, but the rest of the container was clean. According to the forensic examiner, the dismemberment had been performed "skillfully." The limbs had been severed from the body at the kneecap up to the femoral neck.

=== Investigation ===
A team of about forty officers from the criminal police's investigation unit quickly located Gonerka after suspicions of murder arose from a discovery. An envelope containing details such as names and a car number led the police directly to him. The suspicions against him were further strengthened when it was determined that the legs had been dismembered by a professional.

The car had been found in a square, and Gonerka was located there when he arrived at midnight on the night of Sunday, 25 August, to retrieve his car. He was intoxicated and accompanied the police without resistance. During the first interrogation, he admitted to being involved in the murder. Gonerka claimed that he had met Radosz at a restaurant on 22 August, and that they had then gone to his apartment. The police suspected they had known each other longer. In his apartment, the police found the torso and arms of the body. The lower legs were also found in a container.

After his confession, Gonerka collapsed, and during further questioning, he provided a clear account of the events. The murder had occurred in the apartment, which he had meticulously cleaned afterward. Radosz's throat had been cut just below the chin, between the 3rd and 4th vertebrae. Strangulation marks were found on the neck, and the torso, with the remaining arms and most of the neck, was found on his balcony. He had planned to dispose of it later. He took the legs with him in his car and placed them in a container far from his home, attempting to erase traces of himself. Radosz's head was missing, and Gonerka could not provide any information regarding it.

On 27 August, Radosz was identified by the Malmö police. The identification was made using X-ray images from a hospital she had visited. Radosz, who had lived in Malmö since 1969, had known Gonerka for some time, and according to Gonerka, he had struck her with a punch when she proposed marriage. When Radosz stopped moving, he became worried, and when he felt her pulse was absent, he realized she was dead. Gonerka was deeply shaken by the events and could not fully explain why he dismembered her.

On 28 August 1974, Chief Public Prosecutor Åke Sandberg submitted a detention request for Gonerka to the Malmö District Court. He was initially suspected of aggravated assault and gross causing of death by negligence (grovt vållande till annans död). During further interrogations, Gonerka revised some of his statements. For example, he admitted that he had beaten Radosz more severely than he had previously indicated and acknowledged that they had fought a full-blown brawl. However, he maintained that Radosz's death was the result of an accident.

=== Trial and verdict ===
On 18 October 1974, the main hearing began. At that time, a comprehensive psychiatric evaluation was ordered, which was completed in February 1975, after which the trial commenced at Malmö District Court. The prosecutor's primary charge was murder, with an alternative charge of gross causing of death by negligence (grovt vållande till annans död). On 11 March 1975, he was sentenced by Malmö District Court to institutional psychiatric care (sluten psykiatrisk vård) for aggravated assault and causing of death by negligence.

== Hospital time and new crimes ==
In the spring of 1977, Gonerka was declared wanted after escaping during a leave of absence from Saint Sigfrid Mental Hospital in Växjö. Gonerka had been granted permission to visit relatives in Poland. He did not return to the forensic psychiatric facility but was arrested a few months later for new crimes in Poland. A few years earlier, he had obtained Swedish citizenship, and the Polish police put him on a ferry to Ystad without informing Swedish authorities that a murderer was on his way.

== 1977 Ystad double murder ==
Murders of Rut Norinder and Artur Andersson
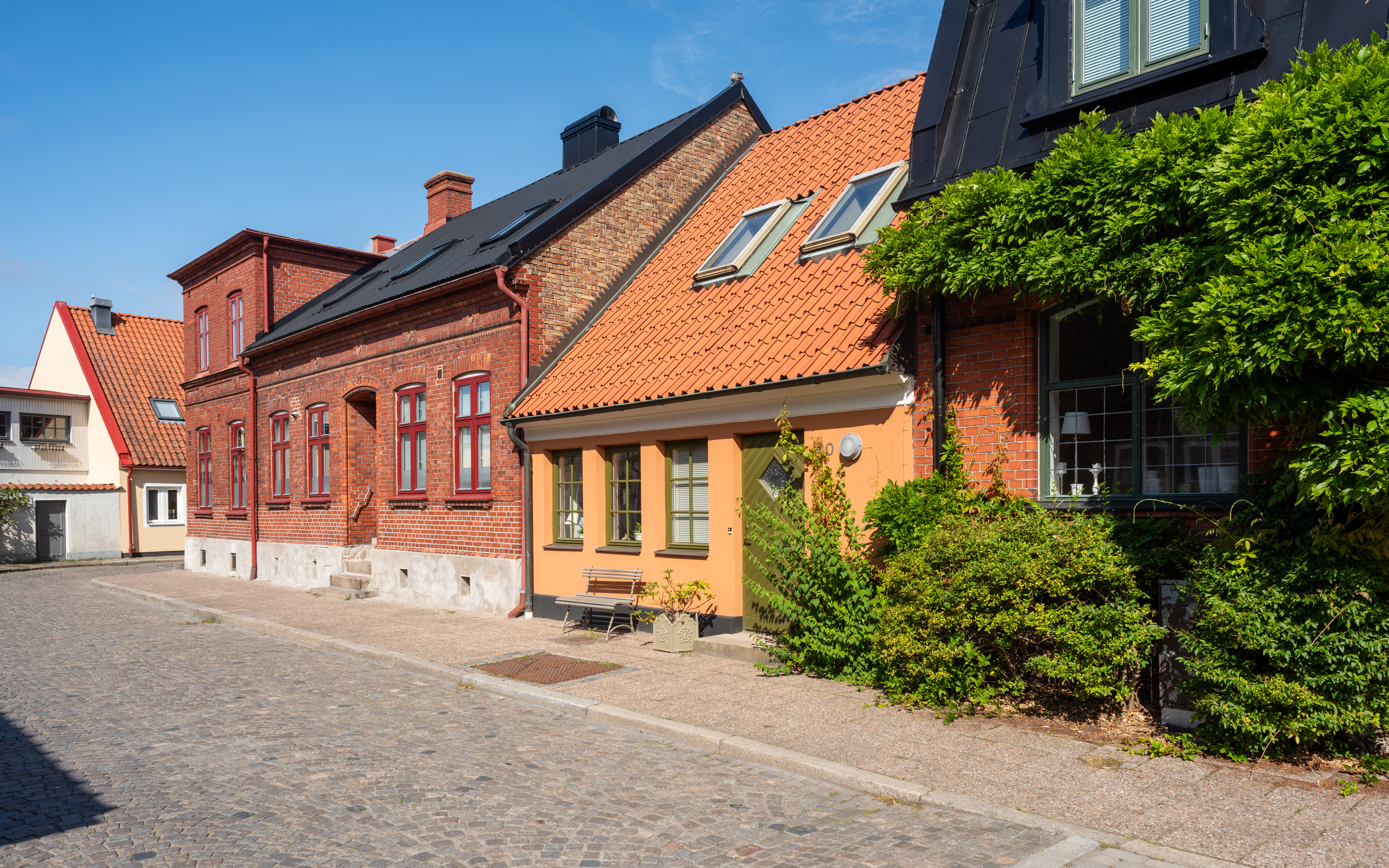
- The murders took place at Dammgatan 38 in Ystad, the building furthest to the right in the picture
- Location: 55.42885°N 13.82360°E; Dammgatan 38, Ystad, Sweden
- Date: 12 August 1977 (CEST)
- Target: Rut Norinder and Artur Andersson
- Attack type: Blunt trauma
- Deaths: 2
- Victim: 2
- Perpetrator: Stanislaw Gonerka
- Verdict: Guilty
- Convictions: Murder (2 counts)
- Sentence: Institutional psychiatric care

=== Events ===
On 12 August 1977, Gonerka murdered Rut Norinder (born 26 January 1907) and Artur Andersson (born 27 October 1901) at Dammgatan 38 in Ystad. Norinder ran a small guesthouse in Ystad, and Andersson was a close friend who often visited and helped her with various tasks. She lived in an apartment just a few hundred meters from the guesthouse. On 13 August the police in Ystad received an anonymous report. A woman, who did not want to reveal her name, claimed she hadn't seen her good friend Norinder for several days and was now concerned that something might have happened to her. That same evening, the police conducted a search of her apartment. They also entered Andersson's apartment, as he was also missing. Since there was no evidence of anything unusual, further action was delayed.

On 15 August the police conducted another search of the apartments, as neither of the two had been seen. They also began contacting their relatives. At around 11:00 AM on 16 August, the police received a tip from a neighbor of Arthur Andersson, stating that an unknown man was in Andersson's apartment. The police immediately went to the location to question him. When they arrived, the man tried to flee but was apprehended. He explained his rush by claiming to be the second mate on the Polish ferry Skandinavia, which was due to depart at noon. A quick check, however, revealed that the Skandinavia was not in port, so the police began questioning him more closely. Eventually, he admitted that he knew Arthur Andersson and that on 11 August, he had been with him and Norinder at a party in an outbuilding. When the police searched the outbuilding, they discovered the two missing individuals. They were dead, and bloodstains indicated that they had been killed violently.

=== Investigation ===
After the discovery of Norinder and Andersson, the district prosecutor in Malmöhus County, Lennart Eliasson, announced that the arrested man was being held in custody. Gonerka denied the charges, but the circumstantial evidence against him was considered strong. At the time of his arrest, Gonerka had Andersson's keys, a postal savings bank book (which contained one crown), and a porcelain figurine in his pockets. During the first interrogation on 16 August, it was revealed that he had arrived in Ystad on 26 July. He denied the murders but admitted to having once had coffee with the retired Andersson.

On 19 August, Gonerka was remanded in custody by the Ystad District Court, suspected of having stabbed the two to death. The charges were murder and theft, and the indictment was to be filed by Friday, 2 September. The hearings were held behind closed doors. Gonerka denied the double murder. At that time, the police had not yet found the murder weapon.

=== Trial and verdict ===
On 14 November 1977, the Ystad District Court found Gonerka guilty of murder. He was sentenced to continued institutional psychiatric care (sluten psykiatrisk vård).

== Later life, death and the murder of Catrine da Costa ==
=== Release and suspected in new murder ===
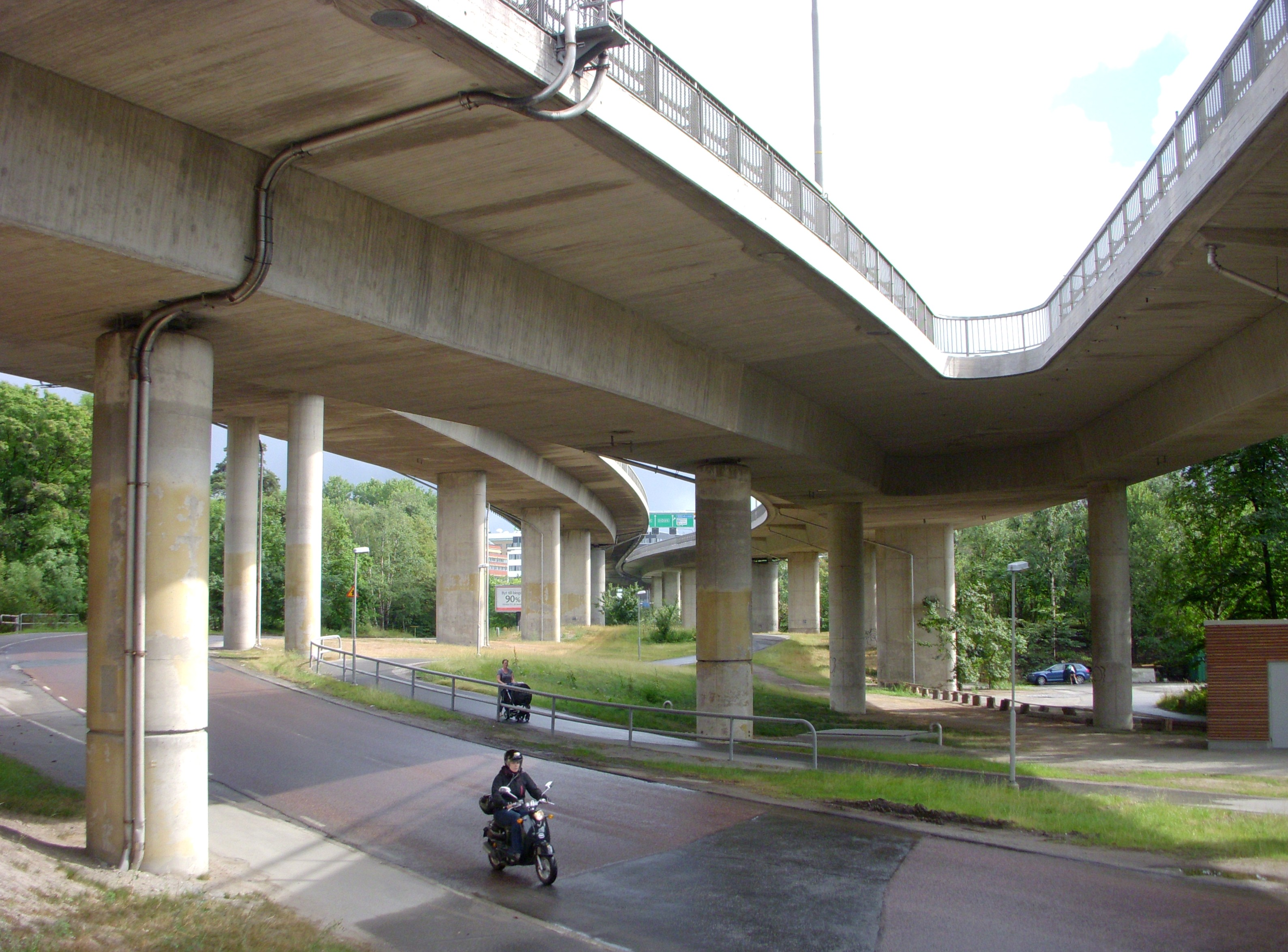
The first discovery of body parts after Catrine da Costa was made on 18 July 1984, slightly below Karlberg Bridge – in the wooded area to the left

In November 1983, Gonerka was released from Sidsjön Hospital in Sundsvall, six months before the murder of Catrine da Costa. The day after Catrine da Costa's dismembered body was found, the police received a tip about Gonerka. He had no alibi for the murder. He lived in Södertälje but made regular trips to Stockholm, where he bought meat cuts, which he dismembered in his apartment and sold to acquaintances. During the brief interrogations with Gonerka, he firmly denied ever having contacted a prostitute. However, several women on Malmskillnadsgatan in Stockholm identified him as one of the men who frequently visited the prostitution area. When the statements from forensic expert Jovan Rajs and the head of the Stockholm police technical department, Wincent Lange, were made, suspicions shifted from Gonerka to Rajs' colleague, forensic pathologist Teet Härm.

Over the years, several tips came into the police regarding Gonerka, but the interest in him was almost nonexistent. Two interrogations were held with Gonerka after Catrine da Costa's murder, but despite the fact that he had no alibi for the time when the murder is believed to have occurred, no forensic investigation of his car or apartment was ever conducted. In the police interrogations, a friend was mentioned, someone who had driven Gonerka to the city during his trips past Malmskillnadsgatan. The police never questioned this friend, and no one knows who he is today, as the investigators did not take down his contact details. There are reports that someone close to Gonerka said, "something terrible has happened" in Gonerka's apartment. However, this tip and many others were ignored by the investigators. The forensic pathologist who performed the autopsies on Gonerka's victims was Gerhard Voigt (1922–2008). A few years before his death, Voigt expressed frustration over the police's lack of interest in Gonerka during the da Costa investigation, saying he did not understand why he was not investigated more closely in connection with the da Costa case. During the autopsies of Gonerka's three victims, Voigt noted that the murderer had anatomical knowledge.

In Per Lindeberg's book Döden är en man (1999), he argues that the murder in 1974 was, in significant ways, identical to the one in 1984. He particularly pointed out one detail in the dismemberment of the Polish woman Wanda's body that showed a "remarkable similarity to the dismemberment of da Costa's remains." He was referring to the severing of the victim's neck.

=== Death ===
Stanislaw Gonerka died on 20 February 1987, three years after da Costa's death, and was buried on 12 March 1987, at Botkyrka Cemetery in Botkyrka Municipality, south of Stockholm.

=== Gonerka's DNA ===
In an application to the Chancellor of Justice in October 2007, complaints were made about the police's handling of the preliminary investigation into the suspected murder of Catrine da Costa. The complaint specifically concerned the DNA analysis conducted on the hairs found on the towel discovered near Catrine da Costa's body. One of the four investigative leads involved mitochondrial DNA testing of the hairs on the towel, comparing them to Gonerka's. In order to accommodate the public, efforts were made to obtain material from Gonerka through the pathologist at the Karolinska Hospital in Huddinge. However, the response was that a court order was required. On 12 February 2009, the chief public prosecutor at the Västerort Local Public Prosecution Office (Västerorts åklagarkammare) in Stockholm decided not to request a search warrant from the district court for the Karolinska University Laboratory, where a tissue sample from Gonerka was stored.

After a review was requested, the deputy director of public prosecution at the Development Centre (Utvecklingscentrum) in Gothenburg decided on 23 March 2009, not to change the chief prosecutor's decision. On 20 April 2009, the Prosecutor-General of Sweden, Anders Perklev, decided to take over the leadership of the investigation, changing the previous decision. According to the prosecutor-general, there were grounds to issue a search warrant to obtain the tissue sample in order to clarify whether a trace could be linked to Gonerka.

The prosecutor-general transferred the case and the leadership of the investigation to the chief public prosecutor at the Södertörn Local Public Prosecution Office (Södertörns åklagarkammare) in Stockholm. The prosecutor applied to the Södertörn District Court for a search warrant at the Karolinska University Laboratory in Huddinge to gain access to the samples. The district court granted the request on 30 April 2009. However, following an appeal by the hospital, the Svea Court of Appeal overturned the district court's decision on 22 May 2009, and rejected the prosecutor's request for a search warrant.

The Court of Appeal rejected the prosecutor's request to seize a tissue sample in the investigation into Catrine da Costa's death. While the prosecutor referred to strong public interest, they were unable to present concrete circumstances that would demonstrate that the action would advance the investigation, strengthen or weaken suspicions against any individual, or have significant relevance to the case. The Court of Appeal ruled that the prosecutor had not provided sufficient legal grounds for the compulsory measure, and that the reasons did not outweigh the intrusion the measure would involve. As a result, the district court's decision was amended, and the request was denied.

The preliminary investigation into the suspected murder of Catrine da Costa was closed on 1 July 2009, due to the statute of limitations.
