= Fredrik Wersäll =

Swedish jurist and civil servant

His Excellency Fredrik Wersäll
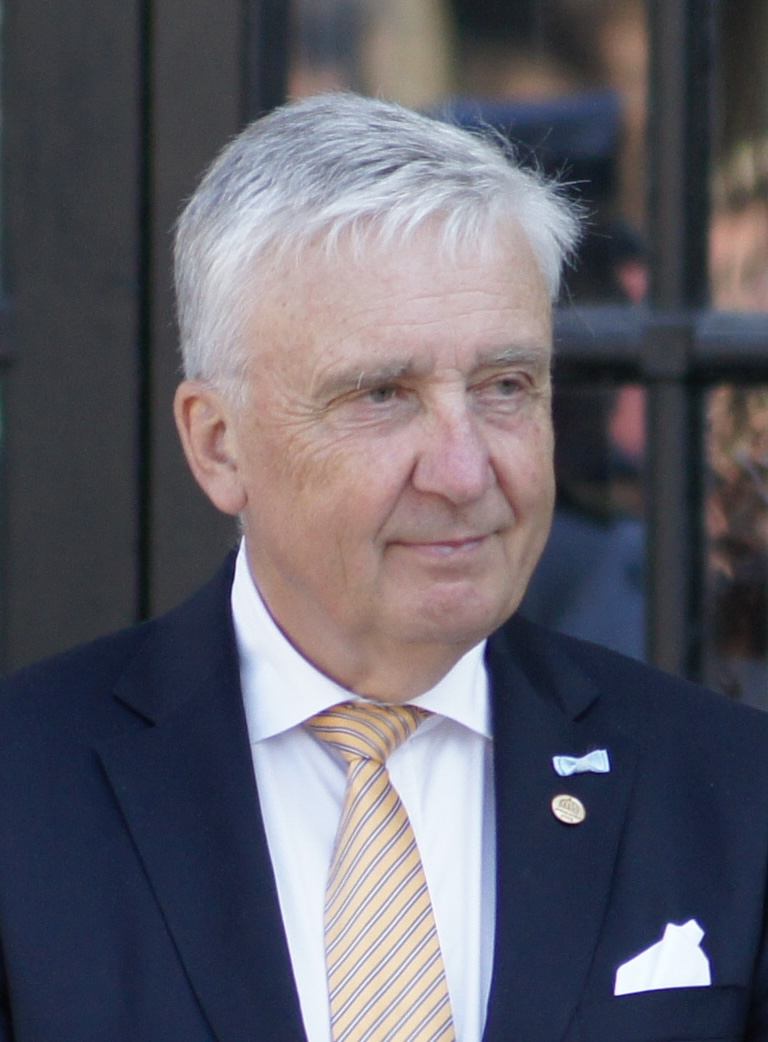
- His Excellency in 2023

Marshal of the Realm of Sweden
- In office 1 September 2018 – 1 January 2026
- Monarch: Carl XVI Gustaf
- Preceded by: Svante Lindqvist
- Succeeded by: Jan Björklund

Personal details
- Born: Claes Fredrik Richardson Wersäll; 30 April 1951 (age 75) Uppsala, Sweden
- Spouse: Anna Wersäll
- Education: Uppsala University

Claes Fredrik Richardson Wersäll (born 30 April 1951) is a Swedish jurist and civil servant who served as the Marshal of the Realm of Sweden and chief of the Royal Court of Sweden from 1 September 2018 to 31 December 2025.

Wersäll was educated at Uppsala University, graduating in 1976 with a candidate of law. He was Prosecutor-General of Sweden from 2004 to 2008 and President of the Svea Court of Appeal from 2008 to 2018. He was appointed Marshal of the Realm of Sweden by King Carl XVI Gustaf on 15 January 2018 and took office on 1 September 2018.

Wersäll served as the Special Investigator of the Kristersson cabinet into the proposal to allow anonymous witnesses in Swedish courts. He presented his findings in June 2024.

== Honours ==
=== National honours ===
- (Sweden) H. M. The King's Medal of the 12th size gold medal worn around the neck on a chain of gold (silver-gilt) (2013)

=== Foreign honours ===
- Italy: Knight Grand Cross of the Order of Merit of the Italian Republic (14 January 2019)
- Germany: Grand Cross 1st class of the Order of Merit of the Federal Republic of Germany (7 September 2021)
- Spain: Knight Grand Cross of the Order of Isabella the Catholic (16 November 2021)
- Finland: Grand Cross of the Order of the White Rose (17 May 2022)
- Netherlands: Knight Grand Cross of the Order of Orange-Nassau (11 October 2022)
- Iceland: Grand Cross of the Order of the Falcon (6 May 2025)

Legal offices
| Preceded by Klas Bergenstrand | Prosecutor-General of Sweden; 2004–2008 | Succeeded by Anders Perklev |
| Preceded by Johan Hirschfeldt | President of the Svea Court of Appeal; 2008–2018 | Succeeded by Anders Perklev |
Court offices
| Preceded by Svante Lindqvist | Marshal of the Realm of Sweden; 2018–2025 | Succeeded by Jan Björklund |
Order of precedence
| Preceded by Svante Lindqvist as former Marshal of the Realm | Swedish order of precedence as former Marshal of the Realm | Succeeded by Ebba Busch as Deputy Prime Minister |
