= Björksund Castle =

- Nyköping Municipality, Sweden
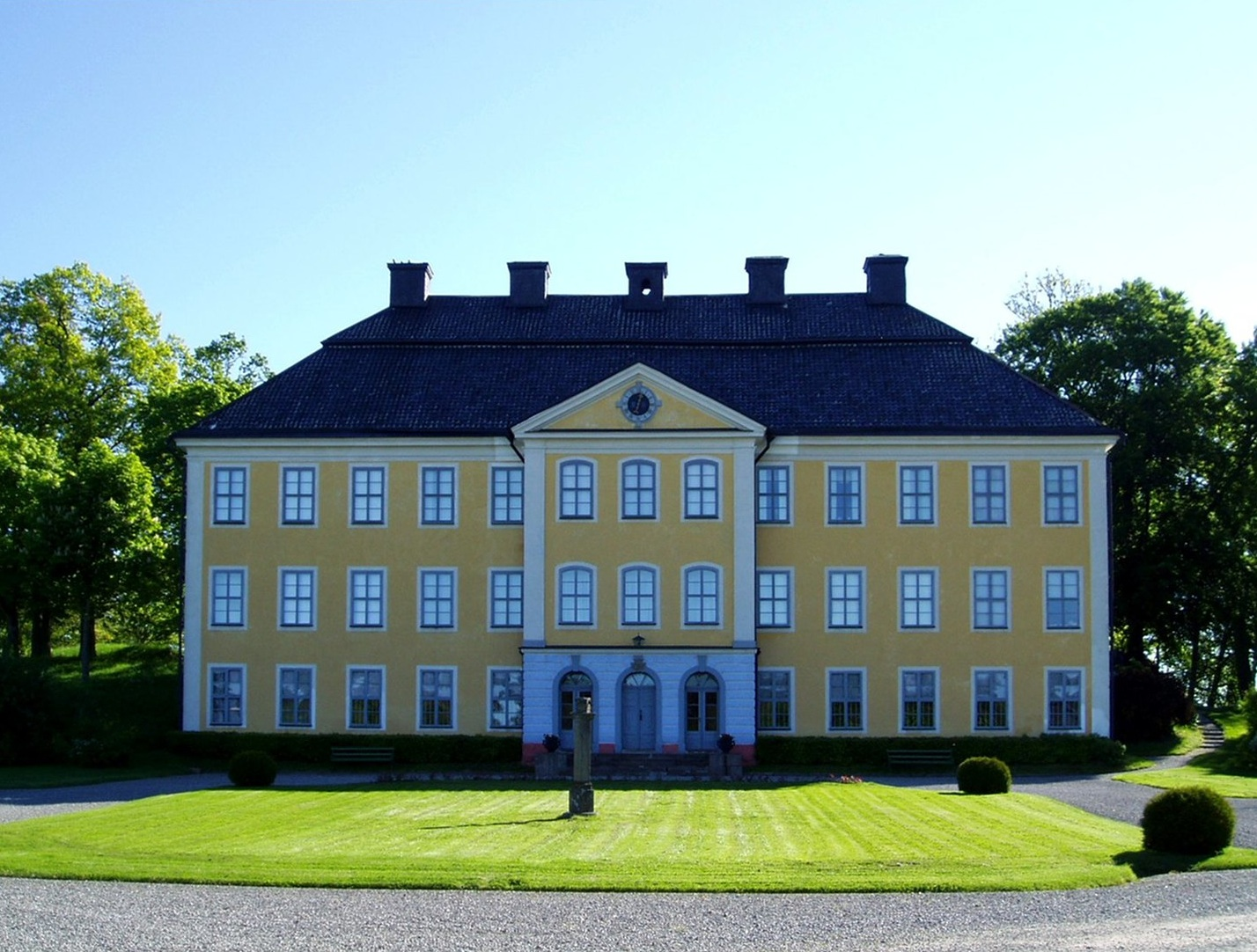

Site information
- Type: Baroque style Manor House
- Controlled by: Björksund Förvaltnings AB

Location
- Coordinates: 58°47′12″N 17°16′51″E

Site history
- Built: 1727

Björksund Castle (Björksunds slott) is a castle-like manor house in Sweden. Björksund located on Sibbofjärden, northeast of Nyköping in Södermanland County, Sweden.

== History ==
The Björksund estate first belonged to the Grip family, but came in the late Middle Ages through marriage to the Privy Councilor Göran Eriksson Gyllenstierna (1498-1575) of Fågelvik. The estate remained in his family until 1776, when it partly passed by purchase to Count Carl Gabriel Mörner (1737-1828), heir to the Privy Council member and Marshal of the Realm Göran Gyllenstierna (1724–1799).

The manor house was built in Baroque style during 1727. It was designed by French-Swedish architect Joseph Gabriel Destain (died in 1740). Additions in the 1740s were by Baron Carl Hårleman (1700–1753).

The estate covers 4,700 hectares (12,000 acres) and large areas of the archipelago. Björksund Förvaltnings AB also manages a number of properties in Nyköping.

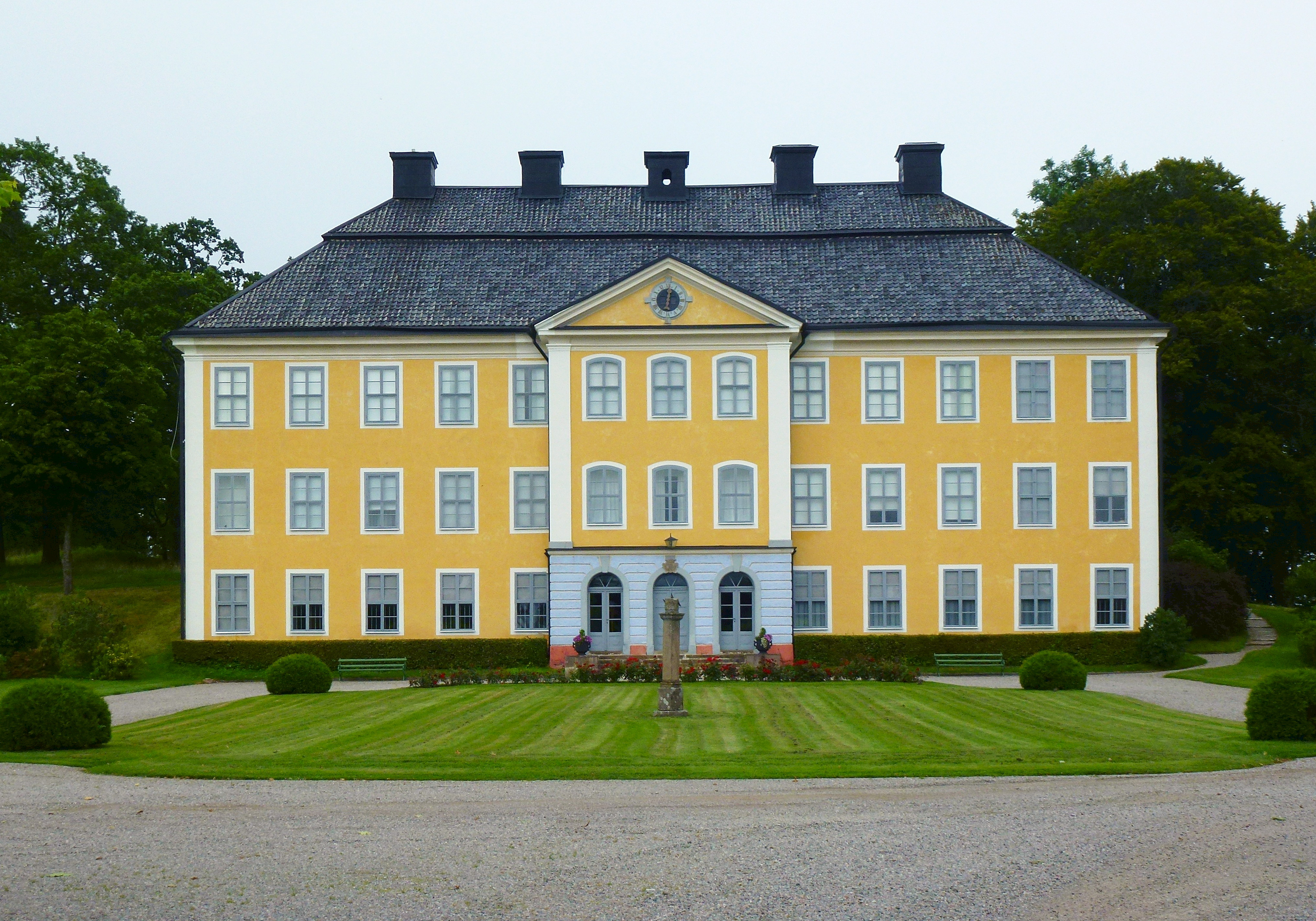
Front side

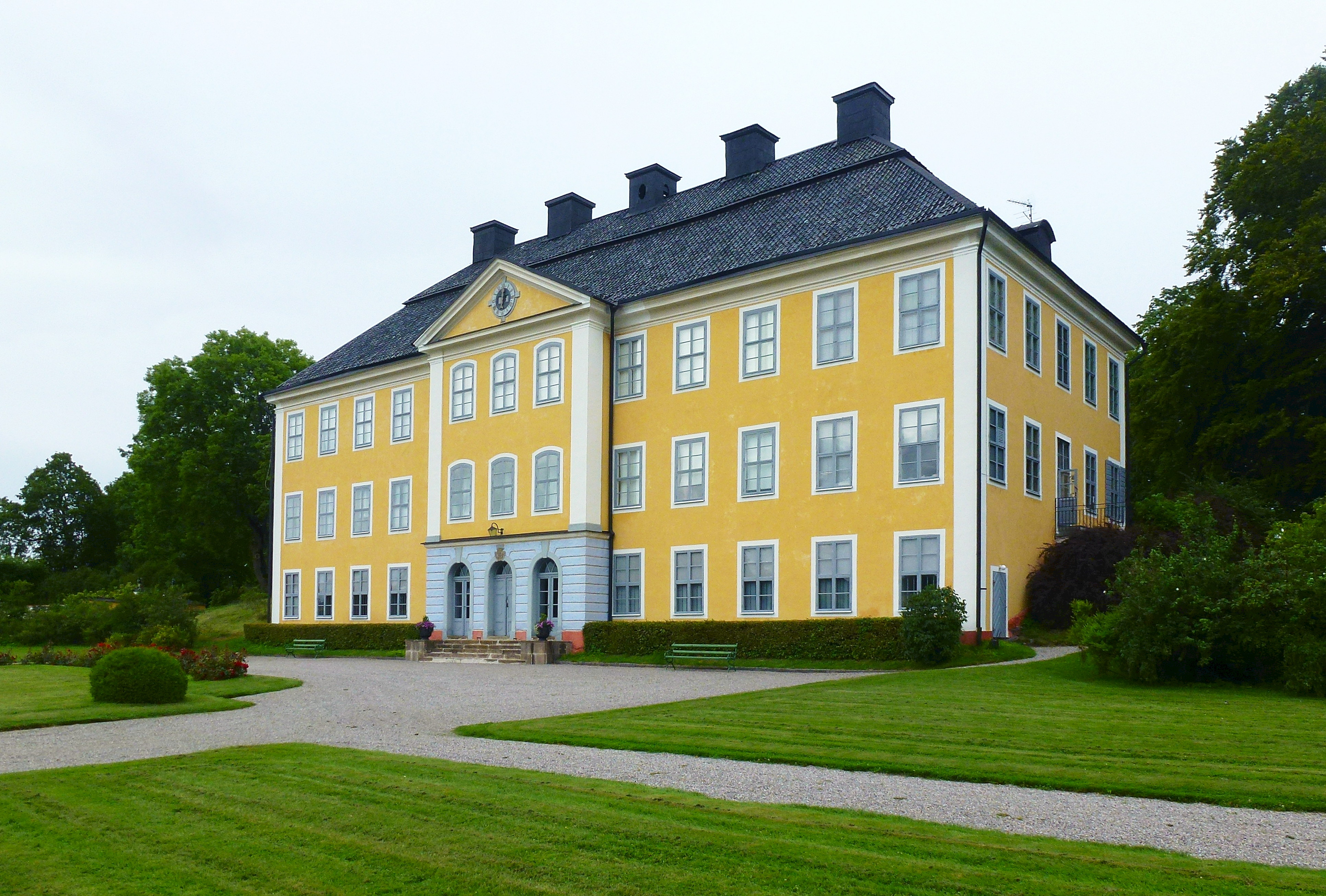
Front side

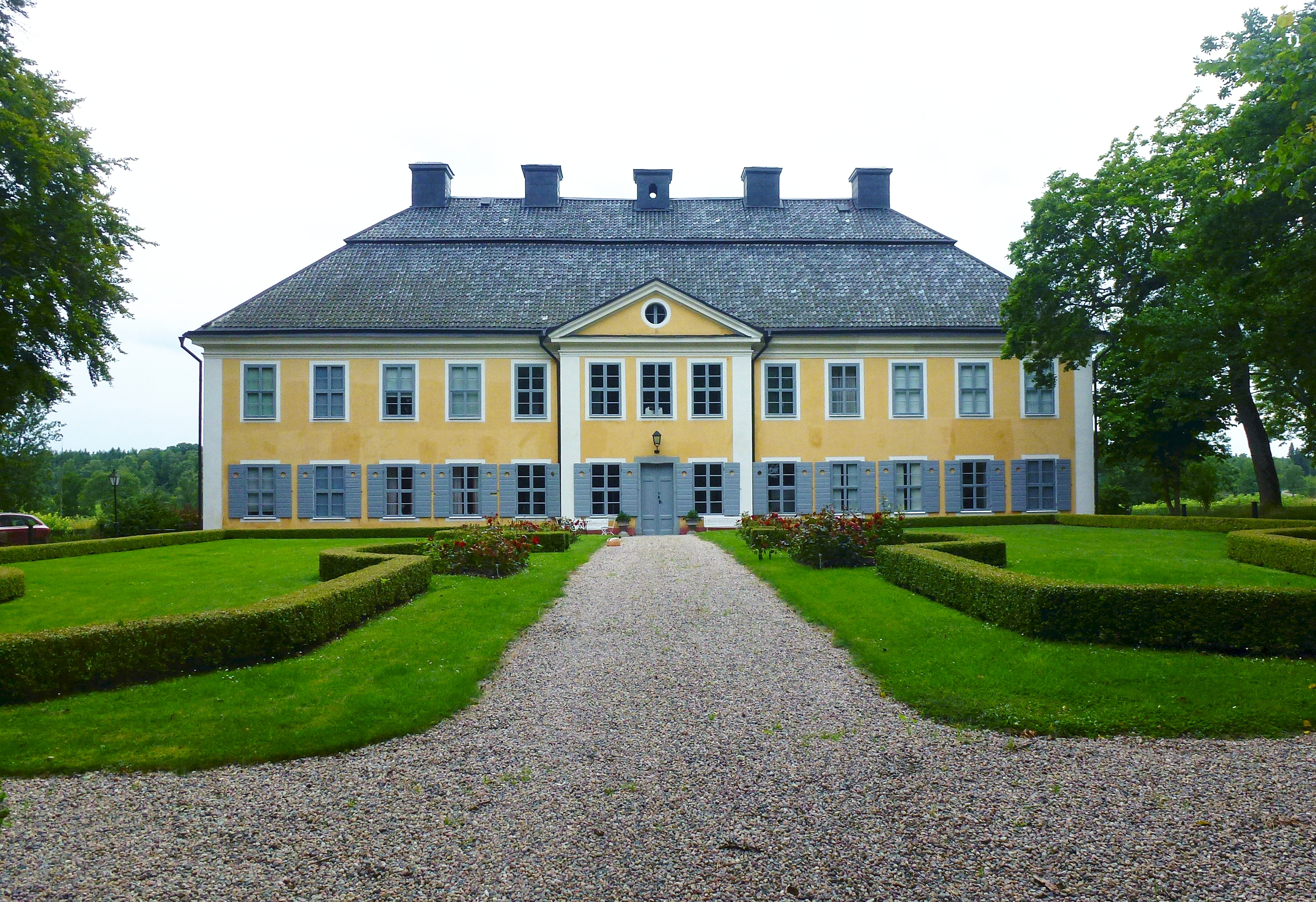
Back side

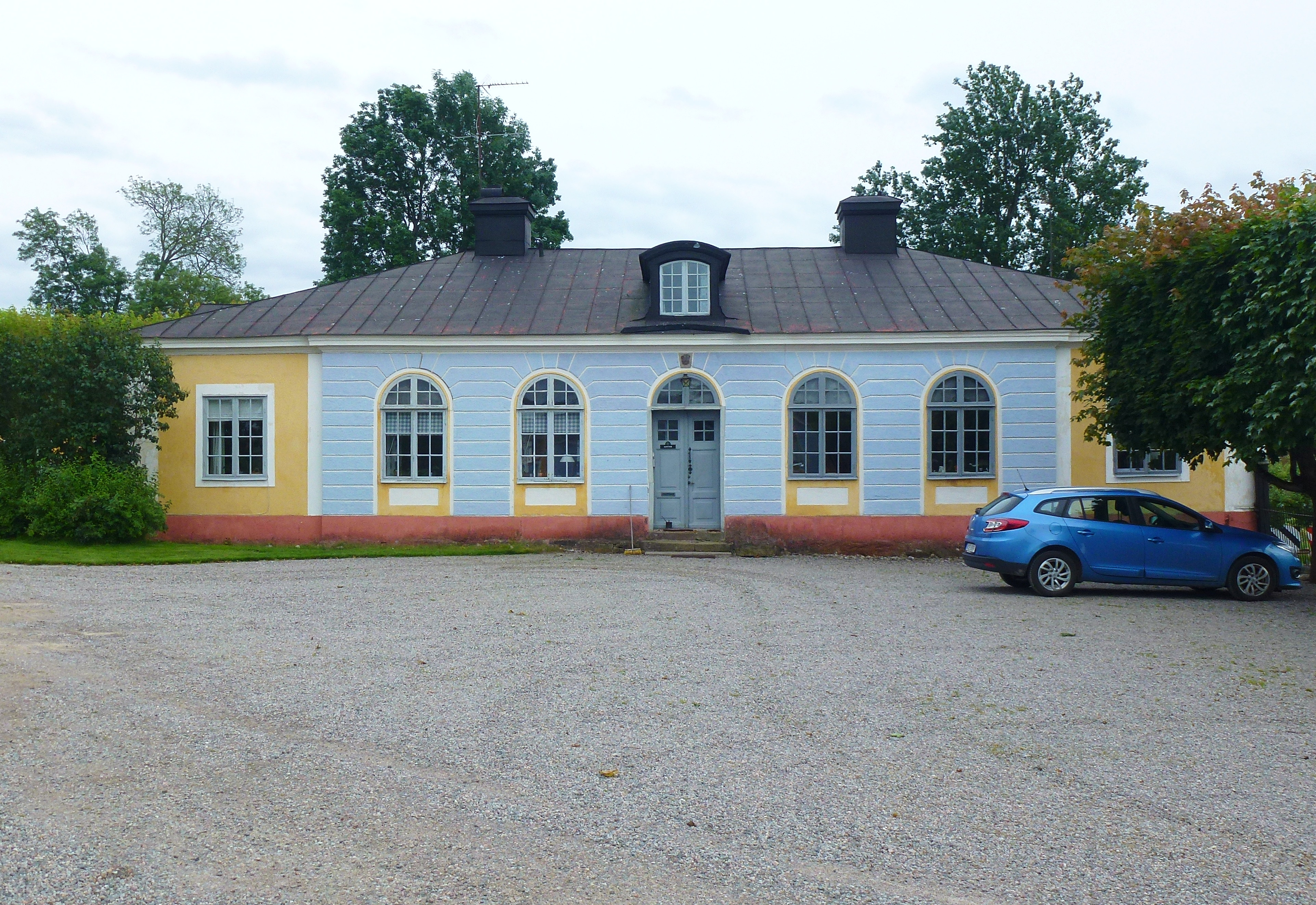
Outbuilding

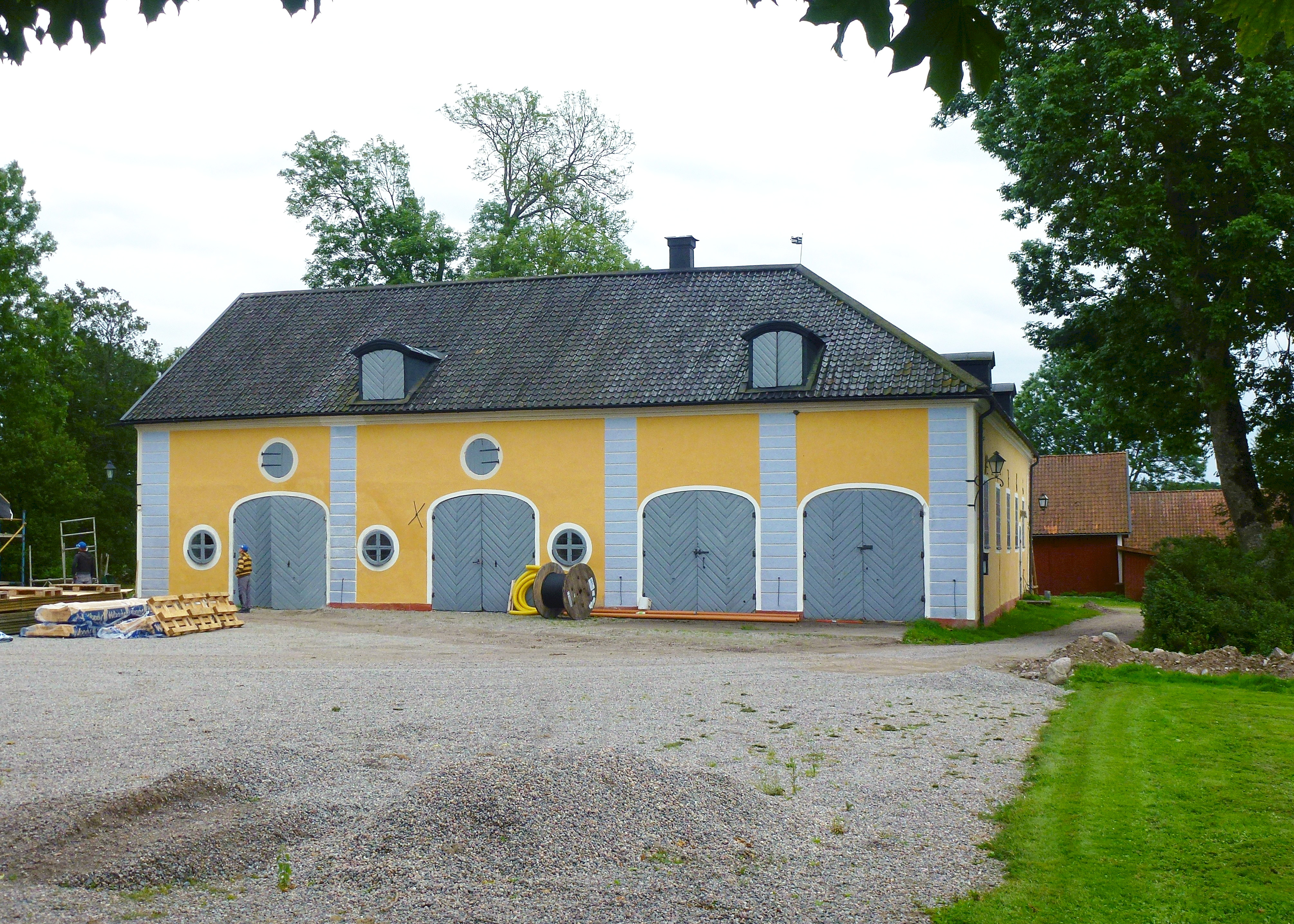
Outbuilding

== Sources ==
- "Björksund". Nordisk familjebok (2nd ed.). 1905 – via Project Runeberg.
