= Jan Nedergaard =

Swedish physiologist

- Born: Jan Jacob Martin Nedergaard-Hansen; 25 January 1952 (age 74); Nykøbing Mors, Denmark
- Occupations: Physiologist, academic and researcher

Academic background
- Education: BSc Chemistry, Biology 1974; PhD Physiology 1980; D.Sc. ("docent") Physiology 1982
- Alma mater: Göteborg University; Stockholm University
- Thesis: Control of fatty acid utilization in brown adipose tissue (1980)

Jan Nedergaard is a physiologist, academic, and researcher. He is Professor of Physiology at the Department of Molecular Biosciences, The Wenner-Gren Institute, Stockholm University.

Nedergaard's research revolves around elucidating the function and physiological importance of brown adipose tissue, as well as the importance of thermoneutrality in translating mouse data to human conditions. He has authored/co-authored 204 primary articles and 134 reviews and book chapters, with 15 original articles as first author and 117 as corresponding senior author, and was one of 9 scientists at Stockholm University and one of 25 scientists in Sweden who were named on the 2019 Highly Cited Researchers list. His primary publications have appeared in journals such as Nature Medicine, Nature Communications, Cell Metabolism, Nature Metabolism, The EMBO Journal, American Journal of Physiology, BBA Bioenergetics and Biochimie.

Nedergaard is a Fellow of the Royal Swedish Academy of Sciences and is a recipient of the Science Award for Obesity Research, The Friedrich Wassermann Award, and Prize for Scientific Review Writing.

== Education ==
Nedergaard pursued studies in chemistry and biology at Göteborg University from 1971 to 1973, graduating in Stockholm with a BSc degree in 1974. Following this, he started his PhD in 1975 at the Wenner-Gren Institute, under the mentorship of Olov Lindberg. He completed his doctoral education with a thesis titled "Control of Fatty Acid Utilization in Brown Adipose Tissue" in 1980, subsequently earning a D.Sc. degree in 1982 from Stockholm University.

== Career ==
Nedergaard assumed the role of associate professor at The Wenner-Gren Institute in 1984, becoming a full professor 1994, and he served as a Member of the Evaluation Committee for Biological Sciences at the Swedish Natural Science Research Council from 1989 to 1995. He served as the Dean of the Subfaculty of Biology in 2003. He was Secretary for the National Committee for Physiology from 2006 to 2016 and has been professor emeritus at Stockholm University since 2019.

== Research ==
Nedergaard has focused his research on brown adipose tissue and its role in metabolism, contributing to concepts such as understanding brown adipocyte precursors, the effects of brown adipose tissue on obesity, and its activity in adult humans. He has also advocated using thermoneutrality to apply mouse data to human conditions, highlighting similarities between human and mouse brown adipose tissue.

=== Brown adipose tissue ===
Nedergaard's investigations into brown adipose tissue have shed light on signaling pathways and functional roles, highlighting the physiological importance of this tissue. In the 1980s and 1990s, he established distinct signaling pathways and functional roles for adrenergic stimulation of brown adipose tissue and showed that alpha1-adrenergic pathways were mainly ionic, while beta-adrenergic pathways were associated with the activation of uncoupling protein-1 (UCP1), which proved to be specifically present in brown adipose tissue. He studied the regulation of UCP1 activation and co-authored the work "Brown Adipose Tissue: Function and Physiological Significance" in 2004.

In his 2007 paper, Nedergaard pointed out that brown adipose tissue is present and active in adult humans. He has also contributed to the establishment of basic concepts in brown adipose tissue research, including the developmental differences between brown and white adipocyte precursors, where the brown adipocytes precursors initially display myogenic gene expression markers. Additionally, his work highlighted how the absence of brown adipose tissue may contribute to obesity, and that UCP1-expressing cells that can develop in white adipose depots represent a distinct type of adipocyte, termed "brite" (now "beige") adipocytes, due to their unique gene expression profile compared to classical brown adipocytes.

=== Mammalian thermogenesis and metabolism ===
Nedergaard's research on mice and human metabolism has emphasized the significance of thermoneutral temperatures in metabolic physiology. He has discussed the critical influence of ambient temperature on metabolic experiments, particularly regarding nonshivering thermogenesis and its implications for understanding mammalian metabolism, highlighting the importance of examining animals at thermoneutral temperatures. His research investigated the impact of housing temperatures on mouse metabolism, demonstrating that mice under thermoneutral conditions exhibited energy expenditure profiles similar to those of humans. Further expanding on this, he compared human brown adipose tissue (BAT) with classical brown and brite/beige adipose tissues, demonstrating that human BAT shared characteristics with classical mouse BAT, affirming their comparable nature.

== Awards and honors ==
- 2011 – Science Award for Obesity Research, Nutrition et Santé
- 2016 – Prize for Scientific Review Writing, American Physiology Society
- 2017 – The Friedrich Wassermann Award, European Association

== Personal life ==
Nedergaard has been living in Sweden since 1971. He is married to Barbara Cannon and they have two sons.

== Selected articles ==
- Cannon, B., & Nedergaard, J. A. N. (2004). Brown adipose tissue: function and physiological significance. Physiological reviews, 84(1), 277–359.
- Nedergaard, J., Bengtsson, T., & Cannon, B. (2007). Unexpected evidence for active brown adipose tissue in adult humans. American Journal of Physiology. Endocrinology and Metabolism, 293(2), E444-E452.
- Feldmann, H. M., Golozoubova, V., Cannon, B., & Nedergaard, J. (2009). UCP1 ablation induces obesity and abolishes diet-induced thermogenesis in mice exempt from thermal stress by living at thermoneutrality. Cell metabolism, 9(2), 203–209.
- Zingaretti, M. C., Crosta, F., Vitali, A., Guerrieri, M., Frontini, A., Cannon, B., ... & Cinti, S. (2009). The presence of UCP1 demonstrates that metabolically active adipose tissue in the neck of adult humans truly represents brown adipose tissue. The FASEB Journal, 23(9), 3113–3120.
- Petrovic, N., Walden, T. B., Shabalina, I. G., Timmons, J. A., Cannon, B., & Nedergaard, J. (2010). Chronic peroxisome proliferator-activated receptor γ (PPARγ) activation of epididymally derived white adipocyte cultures reveals a population of thermogenically competent, UCP1-containing adipocytes molecularly distinct from classic brown adipocytes. Journal of Biological Chemistry, 285(10), 7153–7164.
