= Katarina Johansson Welin =

Prosecutor-General of Sweden since 2024

Elin Katarina Elisabeth Johansson Welin (born 28 March 1963) is a Swedish prosecutor. Since 2024, she is the Prosecutor-General of Sweden.

Katarina Johansson Welin graduated with a Degree of Master of Laws (LL.M.) from Lund University in 1987. Following her service as a law clerk at Karlskrona District Court from 1988 to 1991, she was employed as a prosecutor intern at the Regional Public Prosecution Authority in Jönköping in 1991. She became a district prosecutor in 1995, a public prosecutor in 1996, and a specialized prosecutor in 1999, all within Jönköping. She then served as a specialized prosecutor at the International Prosecution Chamber in Linköping in 2001, becoming a chief public prosecutor there in 2004. In 2006, she was appointed deputy chief public prosecutor at the International Prosecution Chamber in Stockholm, becoming a chief public prosecutor there in 2009. In 2012, she was promoted to director of public prosecution with coordinating responsibilities for Stockholm and Norrland, and in 2014, she became a senior prosecutor and area manager for the Stockholm Prosecution District. Johansson Welin was appointed Deputy Prosecutor-General in 2019. When the then Prosecutor-General Petra Lundh became President of the Svea Court of Appeal in 2023, Johansson Welin became the acting Prosecutor-General. On 29 February 2024 the Government appointed Johansson Welin, with immediate effect, as Prosecutor-General and head of the Swedish Prosecution Authority.
