= Ingemar Eliasson =

Swedish politician

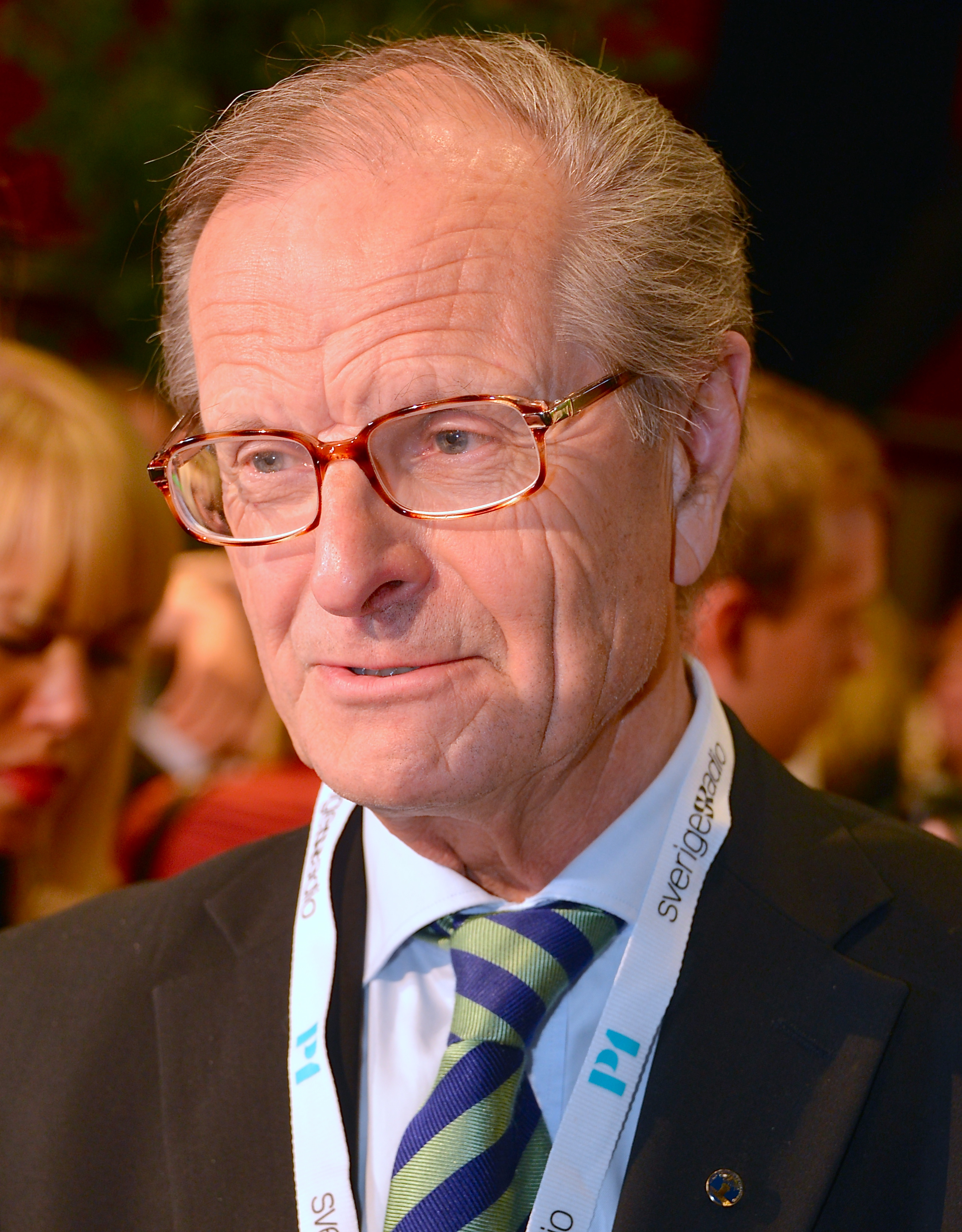
Eliasson in May 2013

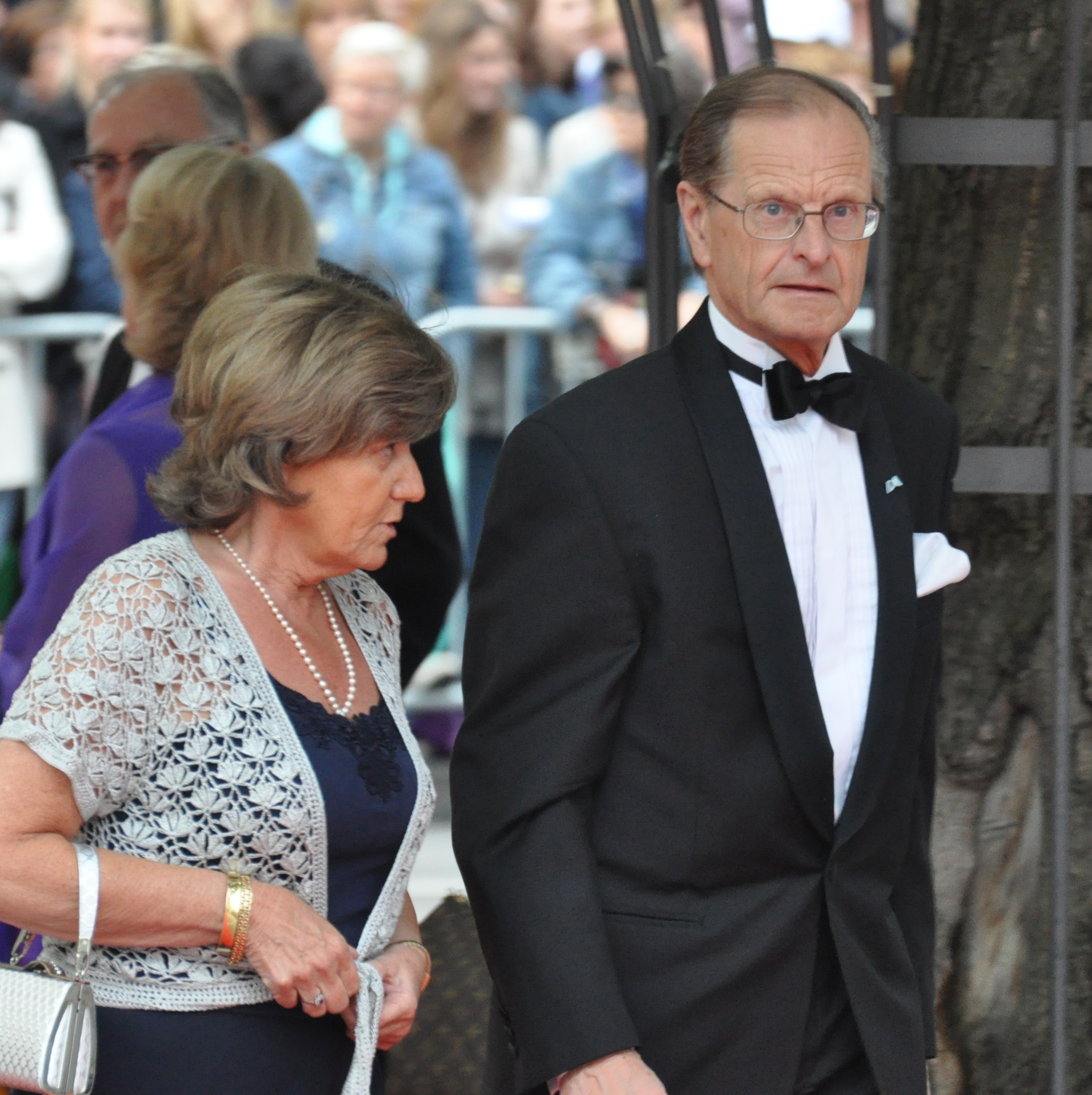
Eliasson at the wedding of Crown Princess Victoria in June 2010

Elis Ingemar Eliasson (born 30 March 1939) is a Swedish Liberal People's Party politician with a long and diverse career, having served as government minister, county governor, member of the Parliament and royal court official.

== Early life ==
Ingemar Eliasson was born in the village of Visnums-Kils, in Värmland County's Kristinehamn Municipality. He holds a Master of Science in business and economics.

== Career ==
In 1976, Eliasson became Undersecretary of State, and served as such until 1980, when he became minister for employment. Following a career as member of the Parliament from 1982 where he was parliamentary leader of the Liberal People's Party from 1985 until 1990. At 1990 he became Governor of Värmland County, serving as such until 2002. On 1 September the next year, Eliasson was appointed Marshal of the Realm, the highest-ranking post he held. As Marshal of the Realm, Eliasson was responsible for the organization of the royal household and reported directly to King Carl XVI Gustaf. Having resigned the court office on 1 January 2010, he continued to function as chancellor of the orders of chivalry until his successors resignation as Marshal of the Realm in 2018 when he assumed the position.

In 2003, Eliasson chaired a Commission of Inquiry into the 1945 disappearance and subsequent death of the diplomat Raoul Wallenberg. His stated mission is to summarize Wallenberg's service in Hungary, his work, and legacy.

== Honors and awards ==
In 2006, the Swedish Council of America presented Eliasson with the Great Swedish Heritage Award in Karlstad, for promoting knowledge and understanding of the Swedish culture and the Swedish heritage in the United States. On 28 January 2010, the King awarded him H. M. The King's Medal, the 12th (largest) size with chain, at the Stockholm Palace.

Government offices
Preceded by Rolf Wirtén	Minister for Employment; 1980–1982	Succeeded by Anna-Greta Leijon
Preceded by Bengt Norling	Governor of Värmland County; 1990–2002	Succeeded by Kerstin Wallin
Court offices
Preceded by Gunnar Brodin	Marshal of the Realm of Sweden; 2003–2009	Succeeded by Svante Lindqvist
Order of precedence
Preceded by Magdalena Andersson as former Prime Minister	Swedish order of precedence as former Marshal of the Realm	Succeeded by Svante Lindqvist as former Marshal of the Realm
