= Swedish Prosecution Authority =

- Åklagarmyndigheten
- The coat of arms of the Swedish Prosecution Authority

Agency overview
- Formed: 2005
- Jurisdiction: Government of Sweden
- Headquarters: Östermalmsgatan 87 C 114 85 Stockholm
- Employees: 1,340 (2014)
- Annual budget: SEK 1,306 M (2014)
- Minister responsible: Gunnar Strömmer, Minister for Justice
- Agency executive: Katarina Johansson Welin, (The Prosecutor-General of Sweden)
- Parent agency: Ministry of Justice
- Key document: Regleringsbrev
- Website: www.aklagare.se/en/

The Swedish Prosecution Authority (Swedish: Åklagarmyndigheten) is the principal agency in Sweden responsible for public prosecutions. It is a wholly independent organisation; not dependent on the courts or the police, and although it is organized under the Ministry of Justice it operates independently and any ministerial interference in cases is unconstitutional. It is headed by the Prosecutor-General of Sweden.

== History ==
The Swedish prosecution service underwent a major reform in 1965. Prior to this, the police and prosecution were organized under the same roof. Following the reform, the Swedish police, the courts and the prosecution service became clearly defined, separate entities. In 1996, there was another major overhaul of the organization, merging smaller local authorities into six regional public prosecutors, all under an attorney general. In 2005, these six regional authorities merged into a single agency, creating the Swedish Prosecution Authority.

== Notable cases ==
In 2019, the Swedish Prosecution Authority reopened an investigation into rape allegations against Julian Assange, first made in 2010, and filed a request for his arrest.

== See also ==
- Crime in Sweden
