= Murder of Catrine da Costa =

Swedish case of murder

Catrine da Costa
- Born: Catrine Beatrice Bäckström; 19 June 1956; Luleå, Sweden
- Disappeared: 10 June 1984 (aged 27)
- Died: c. July 1984 (aged 28); Solna, Sweden
- Cause of death: Undetermined, considered homicide
- Body discovered: 18 July and 7 August 1984
- Children: 2

Catrine da Costa (19 June 1956 – c. July 1984) is a Swedish murder victim whose remains were found in Solna, north of Stockholm, in 1984. Da Costa had been dismembered, and parts of her body were found in plastic bags on 18 July and 7 August. The case is known as styckmordsrättegången ('the dismemberment murder trial'). How da Costa died has not been established as her vital organs and head have never been found.

== Background ==
Da Costa, a homeless divorced mother of two who used heroin and was engaged in prostitution in Stockholm in early 1984, disappeared during Pentecost on 10 June, or shortly thereafter. One witness later stated in a recorded interview that he had spoken with da Costa twice after his birthday on 10 June. The last alleged sighting of da Costa was on 15 June at Gamla Brogatan in central Stockholm, where she was reportedly seen with a middle-aged man about six feet (1.8 m) tall.

On 18 July, parts of her dismembered body were found under a highway overpass in Solna, just outside Stockholm; additional remains were discovered elsewhere on 7 August. Da Costa's body was identified through her fingerprints. Her head, internal organs, one breast, and genitalia have never been found, and no cause of death could be determined. The investigation initially received limited police attention because of the high number of violent crimes in Sweden at the time.

Shortly afterward, Teet Härm, a 30-year-old forensic pathologist working in a laboratory at Karolinska Institutet, came under suspicion. The father of Härm's late wife reported him to the police, although there was no indication that Härm had murdered the 27-year-old da Costa or even that he had ever met her. The father had previously told police that he suspected Härm of having murdered his daughter, whose death had officially been ruled a suicide.

Härm was known to have met prostitutes in the past, and his workplace was located between the two places where da Costa's remains were found. He had also recently worked with forensic pathologist Jovan Rajs and three police officers, including Jan Olsson—then regarded as Sweden's "Super Cop"—on a team investigating unsolved murders of prostitutes in Stockholm. Härm was arrested and later released. Rajs, who was Härm's mentor, supported the police theory that Härm had carried out the dismemberment. His conclusions were later strongly criticised by other forensic pathologists.

Around the same time, the wife of Thomas Allgén, a general practitioner, told police that their 17-month-old daughter might have been a victim of incest. Pediatric examinations found no evidence of abuse, and the doctor and his wife separated in late 1984. That year, Allgén's wife contacted police about her contacts with the suspect Härm. In 1985, she told police that her 27-month-old daughter had begun speaking about witnessing a dismemberment. Because the pathologist and the general practitioner were superficially acquainted, police linked the cases. The ensuing proceedings also included evidence about the 2½-year-old child's statements, as interpreted by her mother and evaluated by a child psychologist and a child psychiatrist. In 2024, the child psychiatrist, Frank Lindblad, stated that he had never discussed a dismemberment murder with the child.

In 1986, police resources were stretched after the murder of Swedish Prime Minister Olof Palme, and the dismemberment case was shelved until the following year. Härm and Allgén were arrested in late 1987 and brought to trial in January 1988.

Other suspects in the case included Polish-born butcher and former policeman Stanislaw Gonerka, who had moved to Sweden in 1958. In 1974, he killed and dismembered his girlfriend, whose head, like da Costa's, was never found; in 1977, he also killed a couple in Ystad. Gonerka was interrogated twice by police in connection with the da Costa case and was also identified by prostitutes who frequented Malmskillnadsgatan in Stockholm alongside da Costa. He died in 1987, three years after da Costa.

Another suspect was Karl Vinoff Reinhold Olausson, who was born in 1943 and died in 2005. Olausson, also known in Sweden as "Vincent" and "the horse killer" after drowning three horses in an insurance fraud case in 1990, was at the time living at the office of his moving company, located on the same street where da Costa's remains were found. He was also known to bring prostitutes to his home. Olausson was later interrogated by police as a suspect in the 1986 assassination of Prime Minister Olof Palme. Kim Larsson's 2015 book about the case identifies Olausson as the perpetrator.

== Trials ==
The first trial ended in a mistrial after the lay judges were interviewed for the newspaper Aftonbladet on 9 March 1988 and commented on the court's justification for its judicial decision. In a second trial, the lower court asked the Swedish National Board of Health and Welfare to investigate the circumstances of the case and found that da Costa's cause of death was unknown. As a result, the two defendants were acquitted, since it could not be established that da Costa died under suspicious circumstances. Although in its verdict the court found that the defendants had in fact dismembered the victim's body, the statute of limitations for that crime had expired.

On 23 May 1989, the Swedish authority for medical-negligence assessment rescinded the doctors' right to work, and its ruling was upheld in a 1991 appeal. The doctors have appealed to several courts, including the Supreme Court of Sweden, the Supreme Administrative Court of Sweden (Regeringsrätten) and the European Court of Human Rights, none of which has overturned the ruling.

== Aftermath ==
The case has been the subject of several books, investigative articles and television documentaries. Author Hanna Olsson published Catrine och rättvisan ('Catrine and the Justice') in 1990, focusing on what she described as the patriarchal nature of the justice system and the tendency to regard women in prostitution as unreliable witnesses. Journalist Per Lindeberg published Döden är en man ('Death is a Man') in 1999, challenging the police investigation and arguing that the men had been victims of a miscarriage of justice, partly caused by extensive media coverage. In 2003, journalist Lars Borgnäs published Sanningen är en sällsynt gäst ('Truth is a Rare Guest'), disputing Lindeberg's conclusions and theorizing that da Costa had been murdered by a serial killer.

In 2006, the doctors sought SEK 40 million (about US$4.8 million) in damages for loss of income during the years in which they were unable to practise, as well as for defamation. The claim was rejected by the Chancellor of Justice, who handles claims for voluntary compensation, on the grounds that a claim of that size should be decided by the courts.

On 3 April 2007, the men's attorney filed a claim for SEK 35 million in damages at Attunda District Court. The trial against the Swedish state began on 30 November 2009 and ended shortly before Christmas. In a judgment issued on 18 February 2010, the court ruled that the doctors were not entitled to damages.

Da Costa's murder has inspired several works of fiction, including Stieg Larsson's internationally successful crime novel The Girl with the Dragon Tattoo and works by Katarina Frostenson and Sara Stridsberg. The statute of limitations for the killing expired in 2009, and prosecutors suspended their investigations on 1 July that year.

In November 2024, the Swedish public television channel SVT1 aired a documentary titled Dokument inifrån: Det svenska styckmordet ('Document from the Inside: The Swedish Dismemberment Murder'). Härm was interviewed four times by SVT journalist Dan Josefsson and said that he had lived as a recluse since 1985, had not held a regular job for a similar period, and had developed a severe hearing disability following a suicide attempt. Also in 2024, the 91-year-old Jovan Rajs confirmed that he stood by his accusations against Härm.

On 16 June 2026, Justice Minister Gunnar Strömmer announced an ex gratia payment of SEK 2 million (about US$210,000) to each man, along with a public apology for what they had gone through.

== See also ==
- List of solved missing person cases (1980s)
- List of unsolved murders (1980–1999)
