= Anders Perklev =

Justice of the Supreme Court of Sweden
- Incumbent
- Assumed office 17 April 2023

Personal details
- Born: 8 January 1960 (age 66) Helsingborg, Skåne County, Sweden
- Education: Uppsala University (LL.M)

Anders Perklev (born 8 January 1960) is a Swedish jurist and civil servant who has been a Justice of the Supreme Court since 2023. He was previously Prosecutor-General of Sweden from 2008 to 2018 and President of the Svea Court of Appeal from 2018 to 2023.

Legal offices
Preceded by Fredrik Wersäll	Prosecutor-General of Sweden; 2008–2018	Succeeded by Petra Lundh
Preceded by Fredrik Wersäll	President of the Svea Court of Appeal; 2018–2023	Succeeded by Petra Lundh
Preceded by Johnny Herre	Justice of the Supreme Court; 2023–present	Incumbent
