= Jan Björklund =

Swedish politician (born 1962)

His Excellency Jan Björklund
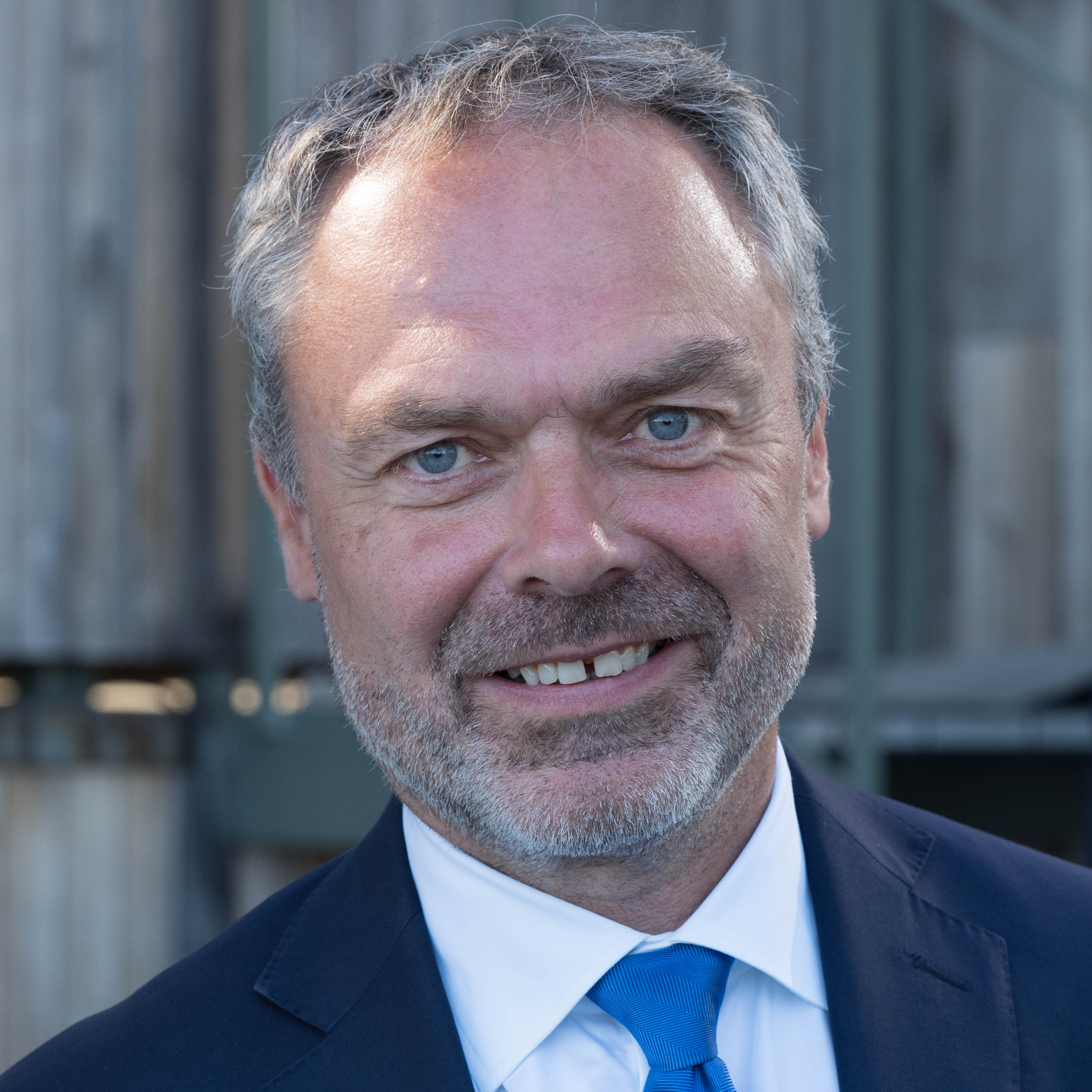
- Björklund in 2017

Marshal of the Realm
- Incumbent
- Assumed office 1 January 2026
- Monarch: Carl XVI Gustaf
- Preceded by: Fredrik Wersäll

Ambassador of Sweden to Italy
- In office 1 September 2020 – 15 August 2025
- Preceded by: Robert Rydberg
- Succeeded by: Karin Höglund

Leader of the Liberals
- In office 7 September 2007 – 28 June 2019
- Party secretary: Erik Ullenhag; Nina Larsson; Maria Arnholm
- Preceded by: Lars Leijonborg
- Succeeded by: Nyamko Sabuni

Deputy Prime Minister of Sweden
- In office 5 October 2010 – 3 October 2014
- Prime Minister: Fredrik Reinfeldt
- Preceded by: Maud Olofsson
- Succeeded by: Margot Wallström

Minister for Education
- In office 12 September 2007 – 3 October 2014
- Prime Minister: Fredrik Reinfeldt
- Preceded by: Lars Leijonborg
- Succeeded by: Gustav Fridolin

Minister for Schools
- In office 6 October 2006 – 12 September 2007
- Prime Minister: Fredrik Reinfeldt
- Preceded by: Ibrahim Baylan
- Succeeded by: Himself as Minister for Education

Member of the Riksdag
- In office 2 October 2006 – 31 October 2019
- Constituency: Stockholm County

Personal details
- Born: 18 April 1962 (age 64) Skene, Sweden
- Party: Liberals
- Spouse: Anette Brifalk (m. 1992)
- Children: 2 (adopted)
- Occupation: Politician; military officer

Military service
- Allegiance: Sweden
- Branch/service: Swedish Army
- Years of service: 1981–1994
- Rank: Major
- Unit: Svea Life Guards (1988–94)

Jan Arne Björklund (born 18 April 1962) is a Swedish Liberal politician. He was a member of the Riksdag from 2006 to 2019, representing Stockholm County, and served as leader of the Liberals from 2007 to 2019. Björklund served as minister for education from 2007 to 2014, and as Deputy Prime Minister of Sweden from 2010 to 2014.

He served as Ambassador of Sweden to Italy from 2020 to 2025 and has served as Marshal of the Realm since 1 January 2026.

== Early life ==
Björklund was born in Skene (today a part of Mark Municipality), Älvsborg County (today Västra Götaland County), Sweden. His father, Arne, worked in the textile industry; his mother, Ragna, came to Sweden from Norway as a war refugee in 1944. He came from a working class home, and both of his parents lacked higher education.

After he had completed upper secondary education (gymnasium) in 1982, Björklund enlisted in the Swedish Armed Forces, and earned the rank of officer in 1985. He then served in the royal Svea Life Guards in Stockholm, from which he retired as a major in 1994 to start a new career in politics.

== Political career ==
In 1976, at the age of 14, Björklund became a member of the Liberal Youth of Sweden, the youth wing of the Liberal People's Party. He was elected a member of the board of the Liberal Youth in 1983, and served as its second deputy chairman between 1985 and 1987. He has served as a member of the board of the Liberal People's Party since 1990. He joined the party's leadership in 1995, became second deputy chairman in 1997, and first deputy chairman in 2001.

In the 1991 Swedish general election, Björklund was elected as a substitute member of the Stockholm City Council, where he came to serve on the city's board of education. Between 1994 and 1998, he served as an oppositional vice mayor (Swedish: oppositionsborgarråd) in Stockholm. Between 1998 and 2002, he served as vice mayor for schools (Swedish: skolborgarråd), and between 2002 and 2006, he served again as oppositional vice mayor.

In the run-up to both the 2002 and 2006 general elections, Björklund was chairman of the centre-right Alliance for Sweden's working group on education policy.

=== Government minister and party leader ===
In the 2006 election, Björklund was elected to the Riksdag; shortly thereafter, he was appointed minister for schools in the new centre-right cabinet led by Prime Minister Fredrik Reinfeldt.

Following Lars Leijonborg's decision to retire as party leader at the Liberal People's Party's national meeting in September 2007, Björklund was unanimously nominated by the party's election committee as the new party leader. He was elected new party leader on 7 September 2007. At the same time, he also took over Leijonborg's positions as head of the Ministry of Education and Research, and as minister for education. The change in his title as minister was merely formal, as his areas of responsibility were still those that he had as minister for schools.

Following the 2010 Swedish general election, in which the Liberal People's Party became the second-largest party in the government coalition, Björklund replaced Maud Olofsson as Deputy Prime Minister of Sweden on 5 October 2010.

== Political views ==
Björklund is often seen as a representative of the more right-wing, hard-edged faction of the Liberal Party. He has focused most on school issues, where he is known for his support for orderliness and discipline. He has criticized the Swedish schools system for being too "dopey", and not focusing enough on knowledge. Among other things, he has advocated more frequent assessments and a reformed grade system.

In 2002, during the run-up to the U.S. invasion of Iraq, as first deputy chairman of his party, Björklund expressed his support for Swedish participation in the multinational coalition on condition that the invasion received broad international support, which it did not.

In January 2009, Björklund criticised the downsizing in recent years of the Swedish Armed Forces. During an interview on an SVT news program, he stated: "After the last year's development in Russia, and the war in Georgia, Sweden must be able to mobilize more soldiers than we can today."

In 2019, Björklund got his wish to abolish the austerity tax (Värnskatten), a top tax rate of 5% points for incomes above €6,000 a month, in turn for supporting Stefan Löfven as prime minister.

== Personal life ==
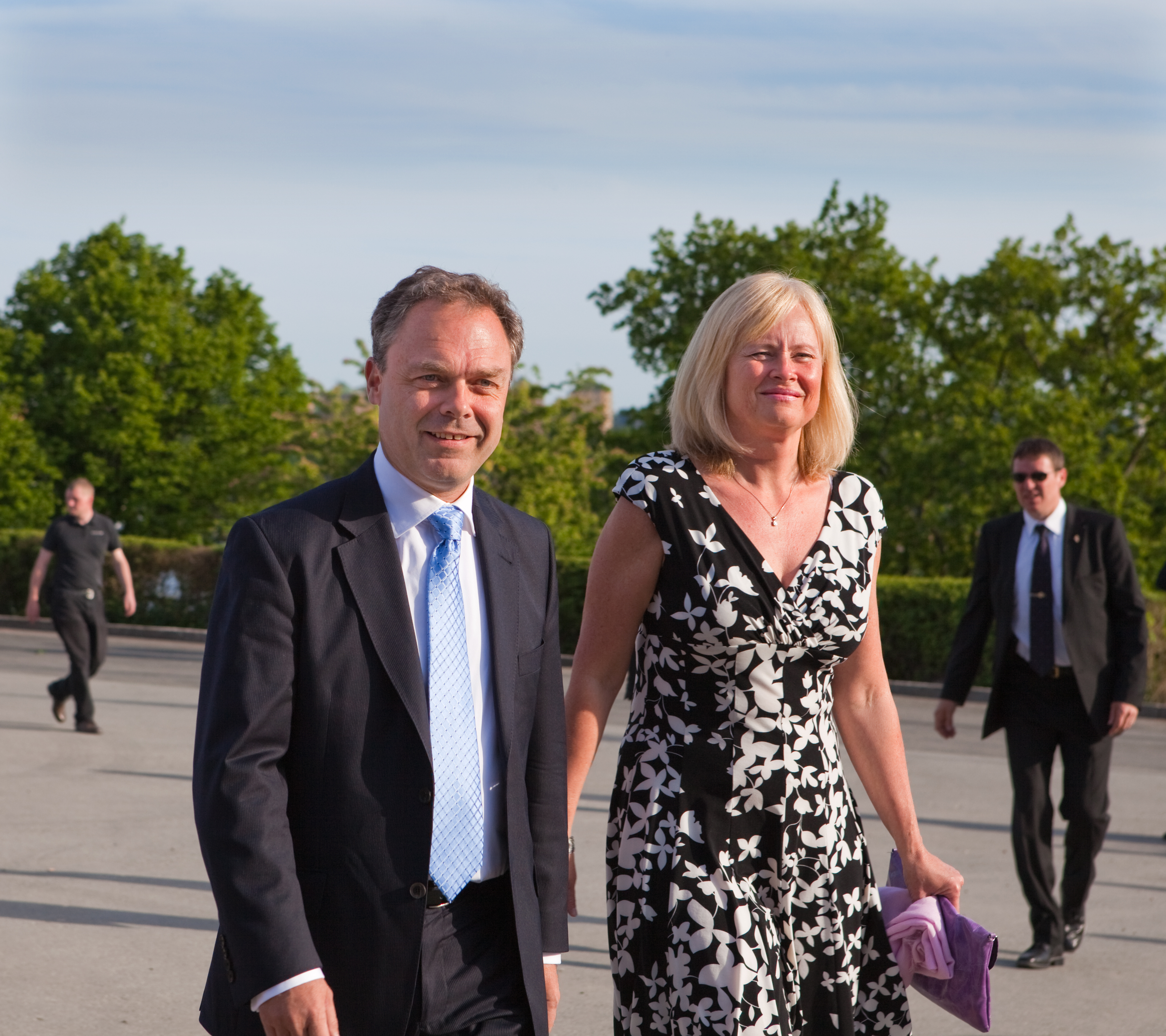
Björklund and his wife at Skansen, Stockholm, in 2010

Björklund married Anette Brifalk in 1992, with whom he has two adopted children, Gustav and Jesper. He lives with his family in Bromma, Stockholm.

He was a celebrity dancer in Let's Dance 2020, broadcast on TV4.

== Bibliography ==
- Leijonborg, Lars; Björklund, Jan (2002). Skolstart: Dags för en ny skolpolitik [Beginning of the school year: Time for a new education policy] (in Swedish). Ekerlids. ISBN 978-9-1896-1730-8.

Political offices
Preceded by Ibrahim Baylan	Minister for Schools; 2006–2007	Succeeded by Himself as Minister for Education
Preceded by Lars Leijonborg	Minister for Education; 2007–2014	Succeeded by Gustav Fridolin
Preceded by Maud Olofsson	Deputy Prime Minister; 2010–2014	Succeeded by Åsa Romson (titular); Margot Wallström (acting)
Party political offices
Preceded by Lars Leijonborg	Leader of the Liberals; 2007–2019	Succeeded by Nyamko Sabuni
Diplomatic posts
Preceded by Robert Rydberg	Ambassador of Sweden to Italy; 2020–2025	Succeeded by Karin Höglund
Court offices
Preceded by Fredrik Wersäll	Marshal of the Realm of Sweden; 2026–	Incumbent
Order of precedence
Preceded by Ulf Kristersson as Prime Minister	Swedish order of precedence Marshal of the Realm	Succeeded by Kirstine von Blixen-Finecke as Mistress of the Robes
