= Claes Adolph Fleming =

Swedish court official and diplomat

His Excellency The High Well-born Claes Adolph Fleming
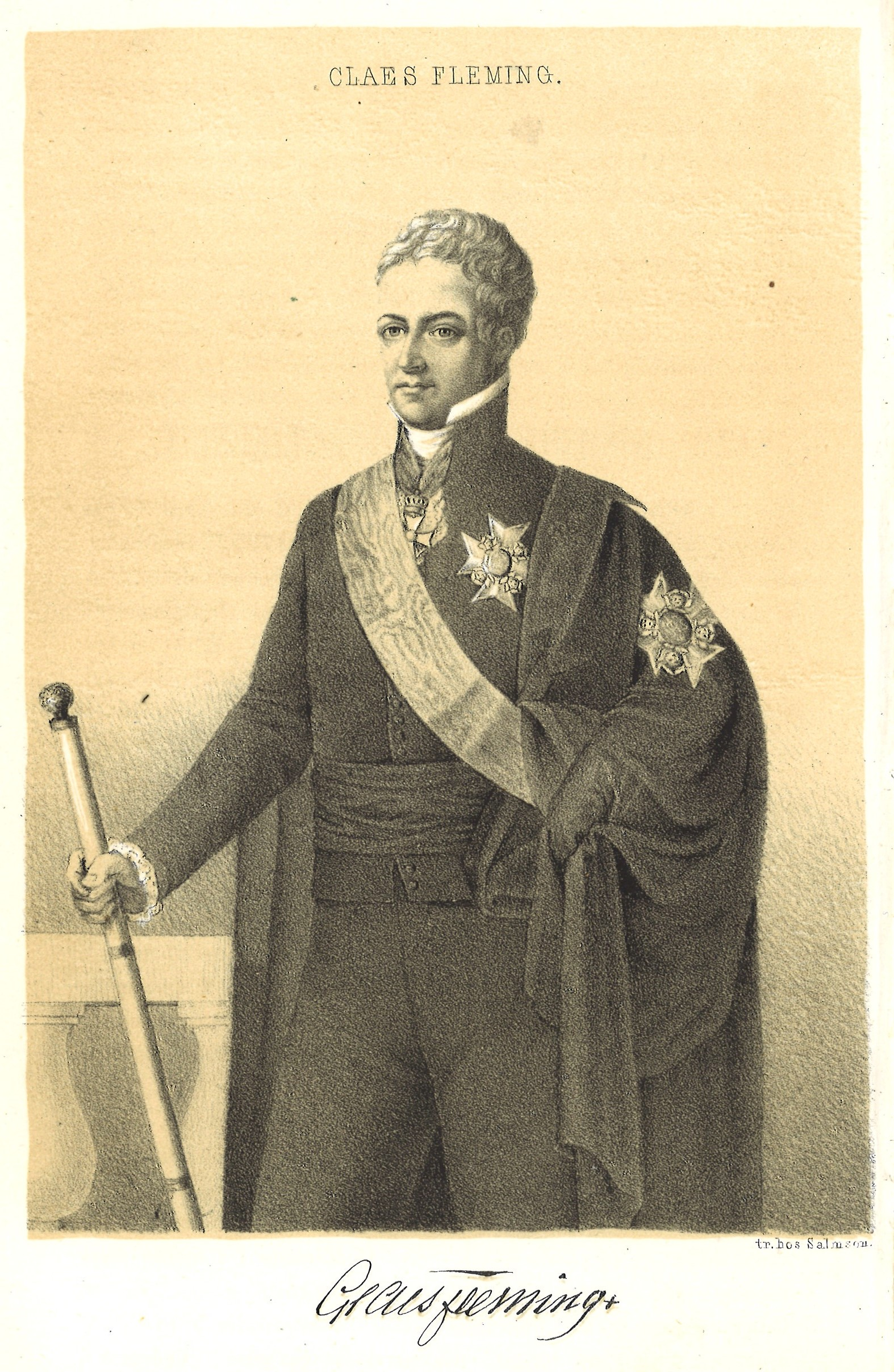

Marshal of the Realm
- In office 1824–1831

Count
- In office 1818–1831

Personal details
- Born: 25 April 1771
- Died: 12 May 1831 (aged 60)

Count Claes Adolph Fleming (1771–1831) was a Swedish court official and diplomat, and member of the Swedish Academy. He was the one of very few personal friends and confidants of king Gustav IV Adolf of Sweden, and according to Hedvig Elisabeth Charlotte of Holstein-Gottorp he was often courted by petitioners, but normally refused to make use of his influence. He was given numerous diplomatic missions by the king, and accompanied him to Saint Petersburg in 1796.
