= Biochimie =

- Discipline: Biochemistry, biophysics, molecular biology
- Language: French; English
- Edited by: Bertrand Friguet

Publication details
- Former name: Bulletin de la Société de Chimie Biologique
- History: 1914–present
- Publisher: Elsevier on behalf of the Société française de biochimie et de biologie moléculaire
- Frequency: Monthly
- Impact factor: 4.372 (2021)

Standard abbreviations
- ISO 4: Biochimie

Indexing
- CODEN: BICMBE
- ISSN: 0300-9084 (print); 1638-6183 (web)
- LCCN: 76612925
- OCLC no.: 1039435995
- Bulletin de la Société de Chimie Biologique
- ISSN: 0037-9042

Links
- Journal homepage; Online archive

Biochimie is a monthly peer-reviewed scientific journal covering the fields of biochemistry, biophysics, and molecular biology. It is published by Elsevier on behalf of the Société française de biochimie et de biologie moléculaire. The journal, started as a French language publication, is also open to English language articles since the late 2000s. As of March 2021, the editor-in-chief is Bertrand Friguet, succeeding Richard H. Buckingham.

== History ==
The journal was established in 1914 under the title Bulletin de la Société de Chimie Biologique, obtaining its current title in 1971.

== Abstracting and indexing ==
The journal is abstracted and indexed in:

- BIOSIS Previews
- Chemical Abstracts Service
- Current Contents/Life Sciences
- Embase
- EMBiology
- Elsevier BIOBASE
- Index Medicus/MEDLINE/PubMed
- PASCAL
- Science Citation Index Expanded
- Scopus

According to the Journal Citation Reports, the journal has a 2021 impact factor of 4.372.
