= Prosecutor-General of Sweden =

Head of the Public Prosecutor in Sweden

The Prosecutor-General of Sweden (Swedish: riksåklagaren) is the department head for the Swedish Prosecution Authority responsible for the daily operations, the highest-ranked prosecutor in the country, and the only public prosecutor in the Supreme Court. The Office of the Prosecutor-General (Swedish: Riksåklagarens kansli) is responsible for legal development, the agency's operations in the Supreme Court, and administrative tasks. The Legal Department of the Prosecutor-General (Swedish: rättsavdelningen) has an overall responsibility for the operations in the Supreme Court and key international issues. The office was established in 1948, when the Chancellor of Justice's task as chief prosecutor was transferred to the Prosecutor-General.

The Prosecutor-General is organized under the Ministry of Justice and appointed by the Government, though without belonging to the spoils system, and can only be dismissed under special circumstances described in the Letters Patent Act, with support from the Swedish National Disciplinary Offence Board (Swedish: Statens ansvarsnämnd).

== List of Prosecutors-General ==
There have been eight Prosecutors-General in Sweden, since the office was created in 1948.

- Maths Heuman, 1948–1960
- Emanuel Walberg, 1960–1966
- Holger Romander, 1966–1978
- Magnus Sjöberg, 1978–1989
- Torsten Jonsson, 1989–1994
- Klas Bergenstrand, 1994–2004
- Fredrik Wersäll, 2004–2008
- Anders Perklev, 2008–2018
- Petra Lundh, 2018–2023
- Katarina Johansson Welin, 2024–

== See also ==
- Supreme Court of Sweden
- Crime in Sweden
