= Barbara Cannon =

British physiologist

- Born: July 10, 1946
- Died: January 5, 2026 (aged 79)
- Education: BSc, Biochemistry; PhD, Physiology
- Alma mater: London University; Stockholm University
- Known for: Brown adipose tissue metabolism
- Spouse: Jan Nedergaard
- Awards: King's Medal, the Order of the Seraphims (2014)
- Scientific career
- Fields: Biochemistry; Physiology
- Institutions: Stockholm University

Barbara Cannon was a British-Swedish biochemist, physiologist and an academic. She was an emeritus professor at Stockholm University as well as the chairman of the scientific advisory board at The Helmholtz Centre. She was also a consultant at Combigene.

Cannon is most known for her work on mammalian thermogenesis, primarily focusing on the function of brown adipose tissue. She was the recipient of the 2014 King's Medal from the Order of the Seraphims, Sweden.

Cannon was a Fellow of the Royal Swedish Academy of Sciences.

== Education ==
Cannon completed her BSc in Biochemistry from London University in 1967. In 1971, she obtained a PhD in Physiology from Stockholm University.

== Career ==
Cannon started her academic career in 1974 at Stockholm University, where she held various positions, including a research associate at the Wenner-Grenn Institute from 1974 to 1980. Subsequently, she served as an associate professor from 1980 to 1983 and then as a professor of physiology from 1983 to 2013. After 2013, she held the title of emeritus professor at Stockholm University.

Cannon's involvement with the Royal Swedish Academy of Sciences included a tenure as vice president from 2003 to 2008 and subsequently as president from 2012 to 2015. Furthermore, she played an important role in the Nobel Foundation, serving as a member of the Trustees from 2006 to 2011 and taking on the role of chairman from 2008 to 2011.

== Research ==
Cannon conducted research in the field of mammalian thermogenesis. Her research portfolio includes 185 original articles, as well as 125 invited review articles and book chapters. Notably, she authored a fundamental review on brown adipose tissue function in Physiological Reviews and a paradigm-changing review article for the American Journal of Physiology where she presented findings from radiology literature suggesting the existence of brown adipose tissue in adult humans.

=== Function and significance of brown adipose tissue ===
Cannon's initial publications, alongside Stanley Prusiner, definitively showed that thermogenesis was primarily driven by mitochondrial uncoupling, likely induced by the presence of free fatty acids. She subsequently showcased important elements in controlling the immediate function of the uncoupling protein, involving fatty acids, possibly their CoA derivatives, and reactive oxygen species (ROS) products. Her articles on regulating ATP synthase levels in mitochondria relative to electron transport chain density, demonstrated in brown adipose tissue, suggest that this concept applies universally, with the P1 isoform of subunit c governing fully assembled enzyme levels in the membrane.

Cannon pioneered primary cell culture systems that underpin knowledge of brown adipocyte development and recruitment. Using these cultures, she identified adrenergic signal transduction pathways responsible for both acute thermogenesis and chronic actions like cell proliferation and differentiation triggered by noradrenaline. She further clarified that the development paths of brown and white adipocytes are separate, with brown adipocytes showing characteristics of skeletal muscle early in their differentiation process. In her later research, she found that cultured adipocytes from different white adipose depots contained precursor cells capable of adopting a brown-like or "brite" phenotype, also known as beige fat. Although these findings have sparked significant interest, she has advised caution regarding the belief that these cells alone will solve obesity problems.

Focusing on integrative physiology, Cannon's research on mice lacking the UCP1 gene revealed that there are no alternative mechanisms for adrenergically induced adaptive thermogenesis apart from UCP1 in brown adipose tissue. This finding challenges the notion of adaptive adrenergic muscular thermogenesis and suggests that UCP1-deficient mice tend to develop modest obesity spontaneously. Moreover, she advocated for humanizing mice by providing them with appealing diets and maintaining their housing conditions at thermoneutral temperatures to mimic the metabolism of adult humans at its lowest point. Furthermore, her review on active brown adipose tissue in adult humans has prompted numerous follow-up experiments and offered promising avenues for pharmacological interventions in obesity management.

== Awards and honors ==
- 1989 – Fellow, the Royal Swedish Academy of Sciences
- 2009 – Honorary doctor, Monash University, Melbourne
- 2012 – Knut Schmidt-Nielsen Prize Lecture, International Union of Physiological Sciences
- 2013 – Honorary doctor, Royal Veterinary College, London
- 2013 – European Lipid Research Award, EuroFedLipid
- 2014 – Honorary doctor, Buckingham University, Buckingham, UK
- 2014 – King's Medal (12th size), the Order of the Seraphims
- 2016 – Prize for Scientific Reviews, Experimental Biology and American Physiological Society
- 2016 – Recipient of the Order of the Rising Sun, Gold and Silver Star, Japan
- 2017 – Fellow, Academia Europaea

== Selected articles ==
- Cannon, B., & Nedergaard, J. (2004). Brown adipose tissue: function and physiological significance. Physiological Reviews, 84, 277 – 359.
- Nedergaard, J., Bengtsson, T., & Cannon, B. (2007). Unexpected evidence for active brown adipose tissue in adult humans. American Journal of Physiology. Endocrinology and Metabolism, 293, E444- E452.
- Feldmann, H. M., Golozoubova, V., Cannon, B., & Nedergaard, J. (2009). UCP1 ablation induces obesity and abolishes diet-induced thermogenesis in mice exempt from thermal stress by living at thermoneutrality. Cell Metabolism, 9(2), 203–209.
- Whittle, A. J., Carobbio, S., Martins, L., Slawik, M., Hondares, E., Vázquez, M. J., ... & Vidal-Puig, A. (2012). BMP8B increases brown adipose tissue thermogenesis through both central and peripheral actions. Cell, 149(4), 871–885.
- Fischer, A. W., Cannon, B., & Nedergaard, J. (2018). Optimal housing temperatures for mice to mimic the thermal environment of humans: an experimental study. Molecular metabolism, 7, 161–170.
