= Royal Court of Sweden =

Organisation of the Swedish monarchy

The Royal Court (Swedish: Kungliga Hovstaterna) is the official name for the organisation (royal households) that supports the monarch and the royal house. The incumbent monarch, King Carl XVI Gustaf, is head of the Royal Court.

== Organizational structure ==
The Royal Court is divided into segments:

1. The Office of the Marshal of the Realm
2. The Office of the Marshal of the Court
3. The Queen's Household
4. The Crown Princess's Household
5. The Ceremonial Household
6. The Royal Collections with the Bernadotte Library
7. Office of the Governor of the Royal Palaces
8. Royal Stables
9. The Household
10. Patronage
11. Information and Press Department

The Office of the Marshal of the Realm is currently headed by Jan Björklund, who is accountable to the King for the activities of the entire Royal Court organization.

The Marshal of the Realm is responsible for contacts with the government and Riksdag.

Supporting the Marshal of the Realm is the staff office with a Permanent Secretary at the Office of the Marshal of the Realm and a Court Secretary.

== See also ==
- Curia regis
- Royal court
- Swedish Royal Academies
