= Petra Lundh =

Swedish lawyer

National Police Commissioner
- Incumbent
- Assumed office 1 December 2023
- Monarch: Carl XVI Gustaf
- Prime Minister: Ulf Kristersson
- Preceded by: Anders Thornberg

Personal details
- Born: Lena Petra Svensson; October 21, 1963 (age 62) Nosaby
- Spouse: Lars-Gunnar Lundh
- Education: Stockholms universitet (LL.M.)
- Occupation: National Police Commissioner

Lena Petra Lundh (née Svensson; born 21 October 1963) is a Swedish lawyer who has served as National Police Commissioner since December 2023. Lundh also previously served President of the Court of Appeal in Svea Court of Appeal from September 2023 to December 2023; and prosecutor-general from 2018 to 2023.

== Career ==
Petra Lundh obtained her law degree (LL.M.) at Stockholm University in 1987. In the same year, she began working as a district notary at the Stockholm District Court and was certified as a district judge in 1989. She then continued on the judicial track, first as fiscal and then assessor at the Svea Court of Appeal in the years 1989–1995. She was also a civil law expert in the Swedish Tax Agency's legal unit in 1990–1991. In 1996, she worked as an investigative secretary in an investigation into HSB and the so-called spy ring at TV4. The investigation was led by Bengt Westerberg. She was also Secretary of the Audit Commission in the years 1996–1999. Lundh then started working as a legal expert in the Ministry of Justice for just over a year.

In 2001, Lundh became an appellate councilor at the Svea Court of Appeal, where she remained until 2006.

In the years 2006–2007, she was vice-chairman of the Svea Court of Appeal. Lundh then moved on to a position as Chief Councilor at the Stockholm District Court in the years 2007–2012. She then served as a lawyer in the Södertörn district court in the years 2012–2018. On September 1, 2018, Lundh took office as Sweden's Attorney General and head of the Public Prosecutor's Office.

Lundh took office on 1 September 2023 as President of the Court of Appeal in Svea Court of Appeal. On 17 November 2023, Minister of Justice Gunnar Strömmer announced that Lundh would become the new National Police Chief from 1 December 2023.

Lundh has also been a secretary in several different government investigations.
