= Marshal of the Realm (Sweden) =

Official post

His Majesty's Marshal of the Realm
- Hans Majestät Konungens riksmarskalk
- Coat of arms of the Marshal of the Realm

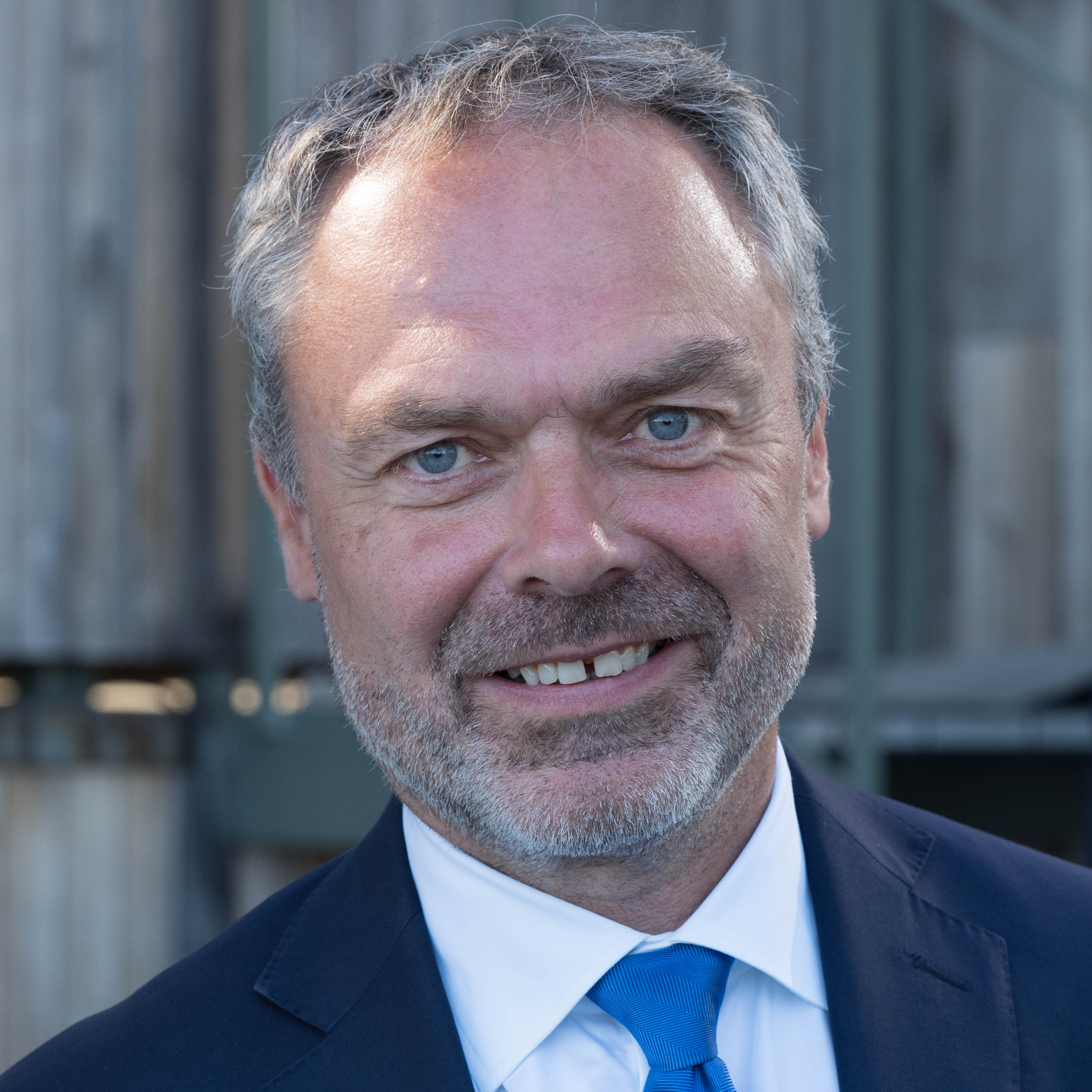
- Incumbent; Jan Björklund since 1 January 2026
- Royal Court of Sweden
- Style: His Excellency
- Appointer: The Swedish monarch
- Term length: At His Majesty's pleasure
- Inaugural holder: Göran Claesson Stiernsköld
- Formation: 1607
- Website: http://www.kungahuset.se/

His Majesty's Marshal of the Realm (Swedish: Hans Majestät Konungens riksmarskalk) who heads the Office of the Marshal of the Realm (Swedish: Riksmarskalksämbetet), is the highest official in the Royal Court of Sweden. The Marshal of the Realm is appointed by the monarch and is directly responsible for the organization and affairs of the court, and for maintaining liaison arrangements with the Riksdag and the Prime Minister/Government. Press releases and official statements from the Swedish royal family to the press and the public are typically released through the Marshal of the Realm.

== History ==
The office was created in 1607 during the reign of Charles IX, and until 1936 during the reign of Gustaf V, with the appointment of Axel Vennersten, it had always been held by a member of the Swedish nobility. The incumbent is in formal writing entitled to the style of Excellency, and is today, apart from Swedish ambassadors, the only officeholder to use this style. Until the 1970s, the Prime Minister and the Minister of Foreign Affairs also used this style, but it has since fallen out of use. The Marshals of the Realm were also in the past, until the reform of the state orders of chivalry in 1975, appointed as Knights of the Royal Order of the Seraphim, but since then Swedish citizens other than members of the Royal House are no longer eligible.

By convention former Marshals of the Realm are appointed as Chancellor of the Royal Orders upon their resignation, a position they hold until the next Marshal of the Realm resigns and themself assume the role.

The present officeholder, Jan Björklund has been the incumbent since January 1, 2026.

== List of Marshals of the Realm since 1607 ==
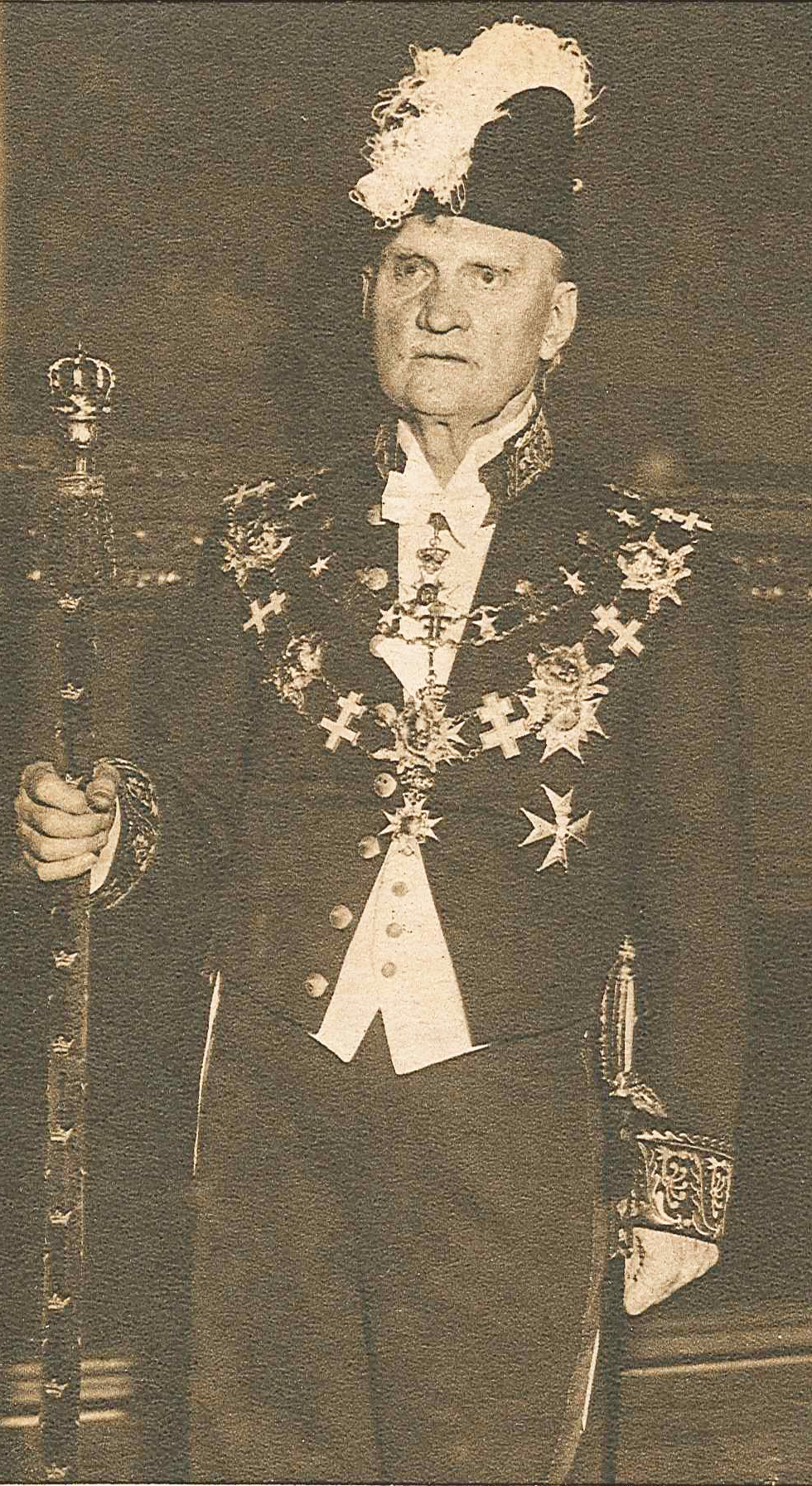
Axel Vennersten wearing the uniform of the Marshal of the Realm and the chain of the Order of the Seraphim.

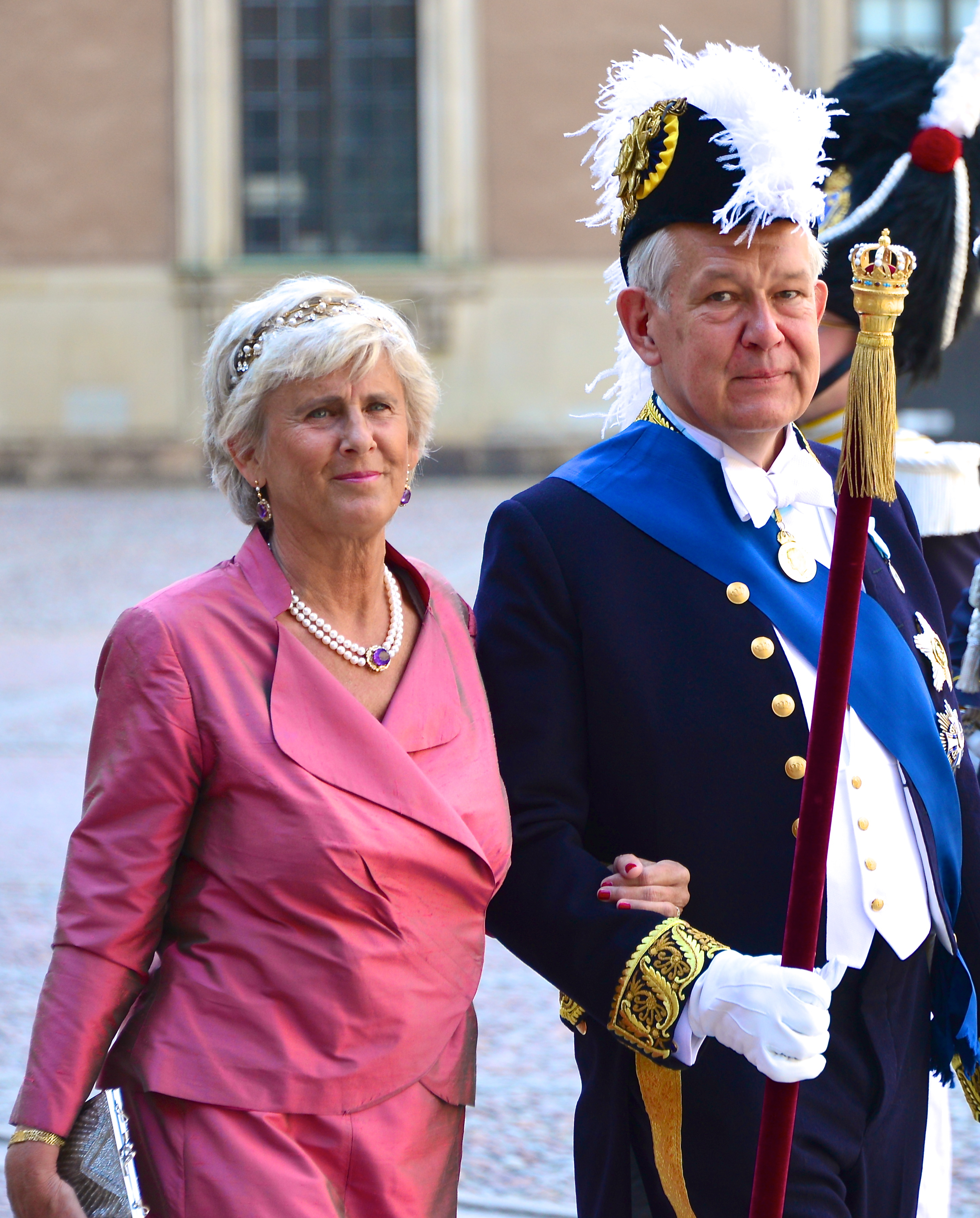
Svante Lindqvist, with wife Catharina, on the way to the Royal Chapel in Stockholm before the wedding of Princess Madeleine and Christopher O'Neill on June 8, 2013.

| | Name | Image | Lifetime | Term of office |
|---|---|---|---|---|
| 1. | Göran Claesson Stiernsköld | | 1552–1611 | 1607–1611 |
| 2. | Henrik Carlsson Horn af Kanckas | | 1578–1618 | 1611–1618 |
| | vacancy | | | 1618–1634 |
| 3. | Axel Gustafsson Banér | | 1594–1642 | 1634–1641 |
| | vacancy | | | 1641–1643 |
| 4. | Åke Axelsson Natt och Dag | | 1594–1655 | 1643–1651 |
| 5. | Magnus Gabriel De la Gardie | | 1622–1686 | 1651–1653 |
| 6. | Adolph John I, Count Palatine of Kleeburg | | 1629–1689 | 1653–1654 |
| 7. | Johan Oxenstierna af Södermöre | | 1611–1657 | 1654–1657 |
| 8. | Gabriel Oxenstierna af Korsholm och Wasa | | 1619–1673 | 1657-? |
| 9. | Johan Gabriel Stenbock | | 1640–1705 | 1673–1705 |
| 10. | Carl Piper | | 1647–1716 | 1705–1716 |
| 11. | Nicodemus Tessin the Younger | | 1654–1728 | 1717–1727 |
| 12. | Magnus Julius De la Gardie | | 1669-1741 | 1727–1741 |
| 13. | Samuel Åkerhielm af Margrethelund | | 1684–1768 | 1741–1747 |
| 14. | Wilhelm Ludvig Taube af Odenkat | | 1690–1750 | 1747–1750 |
| 15. | Claes Ekeblad the Younger | | 1708–1771 | 1750–1761 |
| 16. | Adam Horn af Kanckas | | 1717-1778 | 1761–1769 |
| 17. | Nils Adam Bielke | | 1724-1792 | 1769–1772 |
| 18. | Hans Henrik von Liewen d.y. | | 1704–1781 | 1772–1781 |
| 19. | Göran Gyllenstierna | | 1724–1799 | 1781–1788 |
| 20. | Carl Bonde af Björnö | | 1741–1791 | 1788–1791 |
| 21. | Johan Gabriel Oxenstierna | | 1750–1818 | 1792-? |
| 22. | Axel von Fersen the Younger | | 1755–1810 | 1801–1810 |
| 23. | Magnus Stenbock | | | 1810 |
| 24. | Hans Henric von Essen | | 1755–1824 | 1810–1824 |
| 25. | Claes Adolf Fleming | | 1771–1831 | 1824–1831 |
| 26. | Magnus Brahe | | 1790–1844 | 1831–1844 |
| 27. | Arvid Mauritz Posse | | 1792–1850 | 1845–1849 |
| 28. | Mauritz Axel Lewenhaupt | | 1791-1868 | 1849–1860 |
| 29. | Nils Gyldenstolpe | | 1799–1864 | 1860–1864 |
| 30. | Gustaf Sparre | | 1802–1886 | 1864–1886 |
| 31. | Gillis Bildt | | 1820–1894 | 1886–1894 |
| 32. | Fredrik von Essen | | 1831–1921 | 1894–1911 |
| 33. | Ludvig Douglas | | 1849–1916 | 1911–1916 |
| 34. | Otto Hack Roland Printzsköld | | 1846–1930 | 1916–1930 |
| 35. | Eric Trolle | | 1863–1934 | 1930–1934 |
| 36. | Oscar von Sydow | | 1873–1936 | 1934–1936 |
| 37. | Axel Vennersten | | 1863–1948 | 1936–1946 |
| 38. | Birger Ekeberg | | 1880–1968 | 1946–1959 |
| 39. | Nils Vult von Steyern | | 1887–1966 | 1959–1966 |
| – | Stig H:son Ericson (acting) | | 1897–1985 | 1966–1969 |
| 40. | Stig H:son Ericson | | 1897–1985 | 1970–1976 |
| 41. | Gunnar Lagergren | | 1912-2008 | 1976–1983 |
| 42. | Sten Rudholm | | 1918-2008 | 1983–1986 |
| 43. | Per Sköld | | 1922-2008 | 1986–1996 |
| 44. | Gunnar Brodin | | 1931–2009 | 1996–2003 |
| 45. | Ingemar Eliasson | | 1939– | 2003–2009 |
| 46. | Svante Lindqvist | | 1948– | 2010–2018 |
| 47. | Fredrik Wersäll | | 1951– | 2018–2026 |
| 48. | Jan Björklund | | 1962– | 2026– |

== See also ==
- Admiral of the Realm
- Lesser Officers of the Realm
- Governor of Stockholm
- Reichsmarschall
