= Order of precedence in Sweden =

Relative preeminence of officials for ceremonial purposes

A detailed Swedish order of precedence, including the names of each individual office-holder, was published by the Office of the Marshal of the Realm between 1930 and 1974. From 1975 until 2011 it was included in the more extensive Court Calendar published annually by the same office. The order of precedence of 2011 included 425 individual names arranged into groups numbered 1 to 10. No order of precedence is known to have been published since then.
