= Scandinavian family name etymology =

Heritable family names were generally adopted rather late within Scandinavia. Nobility were the first to take names that would be passed on from one generation to the next. Later, clergy, artisans and merchants in cities took heritable names. Family names (surnames) were still used together with primary patronyms (father's name plus an affix denoting relationship), which were used by all social classes. This meant that most families until modern times did not have surnames. Scandinavian patronyms were generally derived from the father's given name with the addition of a suffix meaning 'son' or 'daughter' or by occupation like Møller - ( Miller ) naming tradition remained commonly used throughout the Scandinavian countries during the time of surname formation. Forms of the patronymic suffixes include: -son, -sen, -fen, -søn, -ler, -zen, -zon/zoon, and -sson,'datter'.

== Denmark ==
The most common Danish family name surnames are patronymic and end in -sen; for example Rasmussen, originally meaning "son of Rasmus" (Rasmus' son). Descendants of Danish or Norwegian immigrants to the United States frequently have similar names ending in the suffix "-sen" or have changed the spelling to "-son". Approximately one-third of the Danish population bear one of the ten most common surnames. More than two-thirds have a patronym ending in -sen in their full name. Many of these patronymics are, however, very rare, local or testimony of unusual descent, e.g. Heilesen from Northern Jutland, Holdensen and Boldsen from the former Duchy of Schleswig or Common etymological classes of surnames are occupational (e.g., Møller—miller, Schmidt—smith, and Fisker—fisher, for example names taken after a village or farmstead inhabited by ancestors.

Other higher class people took heritable surnames during the following centuries, clergy often Latinized names (e.g. Pontoppidan made from Broby) and artisans often Germanized names. Naming acts applying to all citizens were issued 1771 (for the Duchy of Schleswig only) and in 1828. The rural population only reluctantly gave up the traditional primary patronyms. Several naming acts replaced the first; in 1856, 1904, 1961, 1981, 2005. The result of the first act was that most people took a patronymic surname as their heritable family name, with the overwhelming dominance of a few surnames as a consequence. Later acts have attempted to motivate people to change to surnames that would allow safer identification of individuals.

In the table, the top surnames in Denmark are listed as of 1971, 2012 and 2022. In 2016, longtime most popular name Jensen was overtaken by Nielsen. The general tendency over the past century has been to give up the commonest names and adopt less frequently used ones.

Rank	Surname	Number of bearers 1971	Number of bearers 2012	Number of bearers 2022	Type	Etymology
1	Nielsen	349,126	264,159	236,397	patronymic	son of Niels
2	Jensen	368,631	264,824	233,713	patronymic	son of Jens
3	Hansen	297,937	220,956	197,548	patronymic	son of Hans
4	Andersen	188,359	161,379	150,161	patronymic	son of Anders
5	Pedersen	203,426	166,417	149,643	patronymic	son of Peder
6	Christensen	159,943	121,147	111,816	patronymic	son of Christen
7	Larsen	148,214	118,144	107,721	patronymic	son of Lars
8	Sørensen	139,111	113,207	102,848	patronymic	son of Søren
9	Rasmussen	117,355	96,250	88,351	patronymic	son of Rasmus
10	Jørgensen	110,132	89,846	82,285	patronymic	son of Jørgen
11	Petersen	130,236	81,250	72,757	patronymic	son of Peter
12	Madsen	76,441	65,222	60,676	patronymic	son of Mads
13	Kristensen	58,990	61,274	57,758	patronymic	son of Kristen
14	Olsen	65,194	49,091	44,629	patronymic	son of Ole
15	Thomsen	40,180	39,473	38,244	patronymic	son of Thomas
16	Christiansen	45,984	37,493	35,143	patronymic	son of Christian
17	Poulsen	36,544	32,526	30,545	patronymic	son of Poul
18	Johansen	36,470	31,517	29,866	patronymic	son of Johan
19	Møller	31,645	30,321	29,481	occupational	miller
20	Mortensen	not in top 20	not in top 20	28,124	patronymic	son of Morten

== Norway ==
Norwegian surnames were originally patronymic and similar to the surnames used in modern Iceland, consisting of the father's name and one of the suffixes "-sen"/"-son" (son) or "-datter"/"-dotter" (daughter), depending on the person's gender. Unlike modern surnames (family names), they were specific to a person and were not transferred to a person's children. Before 1500, hereditary surnames (family names) were almost unheard except among a few, select elite families. For a long time after that, they were inconsistently used and only found in the upper strata (often urban) of society. As late as 1801, only 2.2% of the rural population in Western Norway had a hereditary surname. Starting in the 16th century, use of hereditary surnames slowly grew in the cities. Around a fourth of the population of Bergen had hereditary surnames by the end of the 17th century, a number which had grown to about 40% by the early 19th century. After this, the use of hereditary surnames in the cities accelerated—by 1865, the vast majority of citizens of Trondheim had hereditary surnames, and by the beginning of the 20th century most of the urban population in Norway had hereditary surnames, although non-hereditary patronymics were often used in addition to the family name. The 19th century saw large-scale migration from rural to urban areas, and migrating families often adopted a formerly non-hereditary patronymic as their family name during the move. Around the turn of the century, the common use of hereditary family names became common in rural areas too. In rural areas, toponymic surnames—usually derived from the name of a farm—were a common alternative to adopting a patronymic as the hereditary family name. Finally, a law passed in 1923 ordered that all newborn children should be assigned a hereditary family name at birth, but did not force people who still did not have a family name to adopt one.

Most Norwegian toponymic surnames derive from farm names, and these farms were frequently named after the geographical features of the farm's location. Many farm names and thus surnames derive from just one word describing the most obvious or distinguishing geographical feature of their location (such as "Dal", meaning "valley"), while others again are compounds of several words describing the farm's location or geographical features (such as "Solberg", meaning "sunny mountain/hill"). Example of surnames deriving from farm names include "Bakke"/"Bakken" (hill or rise), "Berg"/"Berge" (mountain or hill), "Dahl"/"Dal" (valley), "Haugen" or "Haugan" (hill or mound), "Lie" (side of a valley), "Moen" (meadow), "Rud" (clearing), "Vik" (bay or inlet), and "Hagen" (pasture). As Norwegian orthography has undergone substantial standardisation and change since surnames were made mandatory, toponymic surnames are commonly spelt in archaic ways. For example, the surnames "Wiik" and "Wiig" are common variant spellings of "Vik" with well over a thousand people bearing each surname, and "Viik", "Vig", "Viig" and "Wig" (among others) are additional, less common variants of the same name. Similar archaic variants exist of many other Norwegian toponymic surnames. There are also Norwegian surnames derived from the word land (Norwegian: country) such as Torland and Kverneland.

Today, surnames derived from patronymics are decreasing in popularity in favour of surnames derived from toponyms. In 2009, 22.4% of the Norwegian population had a surname with the suffix "-sen", while among the newborns of 2009 the share was down to 18.4%. The decline of patronymic-derived surnames is not a new phenomenon—the early 20th century saw a similar shift in the frequency of surnames, caused by demographic changes due to successive waves of migration from rural to urban areas. For example, the proportion of the population of Bergen bearing a patronymic-derived family name decreased by half in the forty years after 1900. The following table lists the 20 most common Norwegian surnames as of 2013:

Rank	Surname	Number of bearers 2012	Type	Etymology
1	Hansen	54,433	patronymic	son of Hans
2	Johansen	51,136	patronymic	son of Johan
3	Olsen	50,655	patronymic	son of Ole
4	Larsen	38,510	patronymic	son of Lars
5	Andersen	37,630	patronymic	son of Anders
6	Pedersen	35,688	patronymic	son of Peder
7	Nilsen	35,435	patronymic	son of Nils
8	Kristiansen	23,910	patronymic	son of Kristian
9	Jensen	23,318	patronymic	son of Jens
10	Karlsen	21,677	patronymic	son of Karl
11	Johnsen	20,964	patronymic	son of John
12	Pettersen	20,466	patronymic	son of Petter
13	Eriksen	19,351	patronymic	son of Erik
14	Berg	18,228	landscape	mountain or hill
15	Haugen	14,467	landscape	hill or mound
16	Hagen	14,202	landscape	enclosed pasture
17	Johannessen	13,539	patronymic	son of Johannes
18	Andreassen	12,218	patronymic	son of Andreas
19	Jacobsen	12,016	patronymic	son of Jacob
20	Halvorsen	11,614	patronymic	son of Halvor

== Sweden ==
The most common surnames in Sweden are originally patronymic. Family names ending with the suffix "sson" are the most common names in Sweden. In 1901, the Names Adoption Act was passed, which abolished the patronymic practice. From 1901, everyone had to have a family name that was passed down to the next generation.

Many family names consist of items from nature, for example Lind/Lindberg (linden/lime + mountain), Berg/Bergkvist (mountain/mountain + twig), Alström/Ahlström (alder + stream), or Dahl/Dahlin (valley). Sometimes the first part of such a composite name refers to the family's place of origin e.g. the Strindberg family originating from Strinne; the second part being just ornamental. Families also frequently have military-oriented names such as Skarpsvärd (sharp sword), Sköld (shield) and Stolt (proud). Those names were originally assigned to soldiers under the military allotment system in effect from the 16th century. As in Denmark, the clergy Latinized their names up to about the 18th century, e.g. Linnaeus. Due to the greater diversity of these names each specific name is less common than most patronymic names.

The listing of 20 most commonly Swedish surnames as of December 31, 2012. Different spellings are included in every name but the name is presented by the most common spelling:

Rank	Surname	Number of bearers 2012	Type	Etymology
1	Andersson	251,621	patronymic	son of Anders
2	Johansson	251,495	patronymic	son of Johan
3	Karlsson	223,151	patronymic	son of Karl
4	Nilsson	171,360	patronymic	son of Nils
5	Eriksson	147,514	patronymic	son of Erik
6	Larsson	124,686	patronymic	son of Lars
7	Olsson	114,280	patronymic	son of Ola / Olof
8	Persson	107,911	patronymic	son of Per
9	Svensson	101,834	patronymic	son of Sven
10	Gustafsson	97,536	patronymic	son of Gustaf
11	Pettersson	96,011	patronymic	son of Petter
12	Jonsson	73,869	patronymic	son of Jon / Jonas
13	Jansson	50,170	patronymic	son of Jan
14	Hansson	43,926	patronymic	son of Hans
15	Bengtsson	34,302	patronymic	son of Bengt
16	Jönsson	32,249	patronymic	son of Jöns
17	Lindberg	27,533	landscape	linden + mountain
18	Jakobsson	26,793	patronymic	son of Jakob
19	Magnusson	26,562	patronymic	son of Magnus
20	Olofsson	26,424	patronymic	son of Olof

== See also ==
- Icelandic name
- Swedish name
- Patronymic
- List of most common surnames in Europe
