= Jónsson =

Jónsson is a surname of Icelandic origin, meaning son of Jón. In Icelandic names, the name is not strictly a surname, but a patronymic. The name refers to:

- Arnar Jónsson (actor) (born 1943), Icelandic actor
- Arnar Jónsson (basketball) (born 1983), Icelandic basketball player
- Arngrímur Jónsson “The Learned” (1568–1648), Icelandic scholar
- Bjarni Jónsson (1920–2016), Icelandic mathematician and logician
- Bjarni Jónsson (artist) (1934–2008), Icelandic painter
- Bjarni Jónsson (footballer) (born 1965), Icelandic international footballer
- Björn Jónsson (1846–1912), Icelandic prime minister
- Eggert Jónsson (born 1988), Icelandic footballer
- Einar Jónsson (1874–1954), Icelandic sculptor
- Emil Jónsson (1902–1986), Icelandic prime minister
- Finnur Jónsson (philologist) (1858–1934), Icelandic philologist
- Gísli Jónsson (1889–1970), Icelandic politician
- Helgi Jónsson (1867–1925), Icelandic botanist and algologist
- Hjálmar Jónsson (disambiguation)
- Jón Jónsson, Icelandic singer
- Jón Sveinbjørn Jónsson (1955–2008), Norwegian poet
- Jóhannes Jónsson (1940–2013), Icelandic businessman
- Kristján Jónsson (politician) (1852–1926), Icelandic prime minister
- Magnús Jónsson (disambiguation)
- Ríkarður Jónsson (1888–1972), Icelandic sculptor
- Ríkharður Jónsson (1929–2017), Icelandic footballer
- Sævar Jónsson (born 1957), Icelandic footballer
- Sigurður Jónsson (disambiguation)
- Steingrímur Jónsson (1769–1845), Icelandic bishop
- Todi Jónsson (born 1972), Faroese footballer
- Ásgrímur Jónsson (1876–1958), Icelandic painter

== See also ==
- Jonsson
- Jönsson
- Jónsdóttir
