= Jonsson =

Jonsson is a surname of Nordic, mostly Swedish, origin, meaning son of Jon. In Iceland, the name is a part of the Patronymic name system. Notable people with the surname include:

- Åke Jonsson, Swedish motocross racer
- Åke Jonsson (1919–2007), Swedish diplomat
- Andreas Jonsson (born 1980),
- Busk Margit Jonsson (born 1929), Soprano opera singer
- Carl Jonsson (1885–1966), Swedish tug of war competitor
- Daniel Jonsson (1599–1663), soldier and commander of Mora kompani of the Swedish Empire
- David Jonsson, British actor and writer
- Dennis Jonsson (born 1983), Swedish footballer
- Eric Jonsson (1903–1974), Swedish chess player
- Folke Jonsson, Swedish opera singer
- Fredrik Jonsson (born 1973), Swedish tennis player
- Gustaf Adolf Jonsson (1879–1949), Swedish sport shooter
- Gustaf Jonsson (1903–1990), Swedish cross country skier
- Hans Jonsson (born 1973), Swedish ice hockey player
- Helena Jonsson (born 1984), Swedish biathlete
- Helene Jonsson (born 1971), Swedish curler
- Henry Jonsson (1912–2001), Swedish long distance runner
- Isakin Jonsson (born 1978), Swedish cannibal
- J. Erik Jonsson (1901–1995), American businessman and politician
- Jan Jonsson (born 1948), Swedish handball player
- Jan Jonsson (1952–2021), Swedish Air Force officer
- Jonas Jonsson (1873–1926), Swedish sailor
- Jonas Jonsson (1903–1996), Swedish shooter
- Lars Jonsson (born 1952), ornithological illustrator
- Lars Jonsson (born 1982), Swedish ice hockey player
- Lars Jonsson (born 1970), Swedish tennis player from Sweden
- Lars Theodor Jonsson (1903–1998), Swedish cross country skier
- Markus Jonsson (born 1981), Swedish footballer
- Mats Jonsson (born 1973), Swedish cartoonist
- Mats Jonsson (born 1957), Swedish rally driver
- Mattias Jonsson (born 1974), Swedish politician
- Mikael Jonsson (born 1966), Swedish chef
- Niklas Jonsson (born 1969), Swedish cross country skier
- Oscar Jonsson (disambiguation)
- Owe Jonsson (1940–1962), Swedish sprinter
- Per Jonsson (born 1966), Swedish speedway rider
- Peter Jonsson, several people
- Robin Jonsson (born 1983), Swedish ice hockey player
- Skuli Jonsson (1892–1943), Canadian ice hockey player
- Sven-Olof Jonsson (1893–1945), Swedish gymnast
- Tomas Jonsson (born 1960), Swedish ice hockey player
- Tor Jonsson (1916–1951), Norwegian author and journalist
- Ulrika Jonsson (born 1967), Swedish-born British television presenter
