= Karsudden Regional Hospital =

Swedish psychiatric hospital

Geography
- Location: Katrineholm, Södermanland County, Sweden
- Coordinates: 59°01′00″N 16°12′27″E

Organisation
- Type: Psychiatric hospital

Services
- Beds: 155

History
- Former names: Karsudden Psychopath Hospital; Karsudden Hospital
- Opened: 1 September 1964

Links
- Website: Official website
- Lists: Hospitals in Sweden

Karsudden Regional Hospital (Swedish: Regionsjukhuset Karsudden), located just outside Katrineholm in Södermanland County, is today one of Sweden's largest and most secure forensic psychiatric hospitals. It operates within an enhanced security framework and primarily treats individuals sentenced by courts to forensic psychiatric care, as well as a smaller number of patients transferred from remand prisons or the correctional system who require inpatient psychiatric treatment.

As of 2025, the hospital has 155 inpatient beds across 14 wards, organized into seven units. Patients mainly come from the regions of Stockholm, Sörmland, and Gotland, under formal care agreements. The hospital employs a person-centered care model, emphasizing patient participation and collaboration in treatment and rehabilitation.

The organization includes specialized units such as an activity center, psychology services, social work (counseling), medical staff, medical administration, internal services, finance, and HR, alongside dedicated functions for security, sustainability, and patient safety. The hospital employs over 400 staff members and is supported by a security manager and a quality manager. A central monitoring center, established in 2022, further strengthens operational security.

Clinically, schizophrenia is the most common primary diagnosis among patients, followed by other psychotic disorders. The hospital also treats individuals with severe depression associated with high suicide risk and serious autism spectrum conditions. At least half of the patient population has a history of substance abuse, making integrated psychiatric and addiction care a key part of current practice.

== History ==
=== Early inquires ===
A pre-1957 government inquiry proposed establishing five hospitals of the type then under consideration, each with capacity for 125 patients. However, the costs proved so high that the matter was referred to the State Committee for the Expansion of Mental Health Care (statens kommitté för sinnessjukvårdens utbyggande) to develop a cheaper solution. It was found that the number of patients could be doubled, and Katrineholm was selected as the site due to the city's good transport connections and diversified economy. The intention was that patients, before being discharged, would engage in vocational work in Katrineholm while continuing to live at the hospital.

At the beginning of 1957 it was reported that Sweden's first psychopathy hospital would be built at Karsudden, north of Katrineholm, provided that Parliament approved a bill that was to be presented in the autumn of that year or, at the latest, in the spring of 1958. The facility was estimated to cost over 10 million kronor, with additional costs for constructing housing for 175 employees. If everything went according to plan, construction would begin in 1958 and be completed in 1960. The hospital would be able to accommodate 250 patients.

To make room for the facility, the municipal finance committee (drätselkammare) of Katrineholm entered into an agreement with Baron Carl J. Bonde of Ericsberg Palace to acquire an area between Lake Näsnaren and the old Katrineholm–Bie road for the sum of 237,000 kronor. Two thirds of this area, or 346,000 square meters, were then to be transferred to the Crown for 370,000 kronor. The finance committee also proposed that the city council grant an appropriation of 250,000 kronor for the construction of water and sewage systems and a pumping station on municipal land.

In an agreement between the committee and the finance committee, the city committed itself to constructing the necessary staff housing adjacent to the institution. The committee's proposal was to be presented at the end of February or the beginning of March 1957. The consultation period was to be six months, after which Parliament would decide on the matter. No definitive cost estimates had yet been made, but it was calculated that each care place would cost 40,000 kronor. The facility was to be built according to a pavilion system. Priority for placement at the new facility was to be given to patients who had previously been treated at the mental hospitals Saint Sigfrid in Växjö and at Sidsjön in Sundsvall. However, the care places in Sundsvall and Växjö were to be retained even after the new hospital was completed, since the total number of places would still not cover even half of the existing need.

=== Opening and the first years ===
Karsudden Hospital was established following a parliamentary decision in accordance with Proposition No. 87 of 1959 and was intended for such psychopaths whose care was to include, among other things, occupational therapy of a broader scope and different character than at ordinary mental hospitals, as well as special vocational training. When the hospital opened on 1 September 1964, it had 235 beds. At that time it employed about 100 staff members of the more than 200 required. The first 60 patients to occupy the new hospital were transferred from Sundby Hospital outside Strängnäs. The intention was that patients would be able to receive vocational training in departments for mechanics, carpentry, and garment production. The latter field was unique to Karsudden in the country.

In 1967 the number of beds amounted to 245. The construction costs for the hospital amounted to approximately 20 million kronor, with an additional nearly 3 million kronor for equipment. Only a small portion of the 245 beds could initially be utilized due to difficulties in recruiting the necessary staff, primarily physicians. To improve utilization, the King in Council decided on 30 December 1965 that a state care institution for alcohol abusers was to be established within the mental health care organization at Karsudden Hospital.

After the first three years, the number of mental health care patients at Karsudden Hospital was mainly between 70 and 90. Of these patients, approximately one third were registered as residents of the City of Stockholm or Stockholm County. The majority of these patients had been transferred from Sundby Hospital. Regarding the building stock at Karsudden Hospital, it was noted that 45 of the hospital's 245 beds were located in closed wards designed with extraordinary security measures. During negotiations, the healthcare authorities agreed that most of these places were to be rebuilt in order to eliminate the prison-like environment. The hospital had a medical center with facilities including radiology, physical therapy, EEG and ECG examinations, a laboratory, a dental clinic, and an insulin treatment unit. In a separate workshop building, departments for industrial production were established, intended both for training and vocational work in woodworking, metalworking, and garment production. In addition, there were opportunities for general occupational therapy.

=== Transfer to the county council in 1967 ===
A 1967 agreement regulated the transfer of Karsudden Hospital in Katrineholm from the Swedish state to the Södermanland County Council, effective from 1 July 1967, subject to approval by the King in Council and the county council. The county council received full ownership of the property, buildings, as well as inventories, equipment, and operating supplies. The state retained responsibility for all income and expenses relating to the period prior to the transfer. The county council also assumed certain contracts, rights, and obligations connected to the hospital and undertook to operate the facility in accordance with a separate agreement with other healthcare authorities. The hospital's residual value was set at 16 million Swedish kronor and was written off over 17.5 years through annual payments to the state, which were offset against state compensation.

Responsibility for hospital staff was transferred to the county council, while the state remained responsible for pension costs attributable to periods of state employment prior to the transfer. Psychiatric care at the hospital was intended to function as experimental and research activity of significance for the future organization of such care. Any disputes arising from the interpretation or application of the agreement were to be settled by arbitration, and the agreement entered into force on 1 July 1967.

=== Renovation in the 2010s ===
In October 2012 it became clear that Karsudden Regional Hospital would be rebuilt in order to meet the increased safety requirements for staff and patients imposed by the National Board of Health and Welfare for involuntary treatment. The county council invested 250 million kronor, and Karsudden itself contributed 100 million kronor from its maintenance budget. The first construction phase began in August 2013, when the old dining hall was demolished to make way for a new building that would house a security office and the administrative court. Two buildings with care wards were to be rebuilt, and all buildings were to be connected. This was intended to make movement between different parts of the hospital easier and safer, as well as to simplify the transport of food and medications. There were also to be fewer entrances and exits, and a barrier at the entrance to the regional hospital. Construction was expected to last three to five years, and operations were expected to continue at full capacity even during the building period.

== Organisation ==
Karsudden Regional Hospital is one of Sweden's largest forensic psychiatric clinics, with 155 inpatient beds distributed across fourteen wards. The hospital, which has an enhanced security classification, provides care for individuals who have been sentenced by a court to forensic psychiatric care, as well as, to a lesser extent, individuals from remand prisons or the correctional system who require inpatient psychiatric care. Patients primarily come from the regions of Stockholm, Sörmland, and Gotland, with which the hospital has entered into care agreements. The hospital applies a person-centered approach, where participation and collaboration are cornerstones of treatment and rehabilitation work.

In 2023, the hospital had fourteen wards divided into seven units. In addition, there are an activity center, a psychology unit, a social work (counseling) unit, physicians, medical administration, internal services, a finance unit, and an HR unit. There are also special functions working with security, sustainability, patient safety, etc. The hospital currently has a security manager and a quality manager who support operations. In 2022, the hospital established a monitoring center staffed by 14 employees. In 2023, the total number of employees was 418.

Schizophrenia is the most common primary diagnosis among patients. Other psychotic disorders are also present, as well as severe depressions with a high risk of suicide, or serious conditions within the autism spectrum. At least 50 percent of patients have some form of substance abuse problem.

== Incidents ==
Escapes or absconding have occurred from Karsudden throughout its existence. In July 1970, four male patients escaped from Karsudden; one was apprehended the same day. In October 1974, a 22-year-old man escaped and threatened a taxi driver with a dagger. He was later arrested by the police. A convicted murderer disappeared during a trial leave in January 1976. In September 1983, the serial rapist John Svahlstedt escaped from Karsudden. The same month, a convicted murderer escaped during a supervised leisure activity. In July 1984, five youths aged 18–22 escaped from Ward C at Karsudden. On this ward, patients were allowed to move freely outside their rooms, but the ward itself was locked. All were apprehended after just under an hour. In April 1987, three men escaped by smashing a door in the hospital library. One was caught immediately and another the following day. In November 1989, a man convicted of murder escaped by jumping over a fence during unescorted leave on the hospital grounds. He was later arrested in Sundsvall. In June 1994, two men escaped during one hour of unescorted leave; one was apprehended the same day.

=== Escapes, Absconding, and Incidents from the Year 2000 ===
In the year 2000, 47 individuals escaped or absconded from Karsudden Hospital. Other incidents from 2000 onward include, among others:

- 27 May 2001: A 30-year-old man, convicted in March 1999 of attempted manslaughter, escaped by forcing visitors to hand over their car keys and fled the scene in their red, foreign-registered Volvo 740.
- 3 April 2004: A 23-year-old man, convicted of, among other offenses, aggravated assault, unlawful threats, narcotics offenses, and weapons offenses, escaped from his caregivers during a visit to the Spiralen shopping center in Norrköping.
- 12 May 2004: A man in his mid-30s, convicted of serious violent crimes, including against his former partner, escaped from the two caregivers accompanying him while he was walking within the hospital grounds.
- March 2005: A 34-year-old man, sentenced to forensic psychiatric care in 1997 for robbery and previously convicted of a long series of crimes, including a manslaughter in the early 1990s, escaped while walking in Katrineholm together with staff. The man returned voluntarily two weeks later.
- 6 July 2005: A man in his 40s was out for a walk on the hospital grounds around lunchtime with staff and managed, despite supervision, to get into a taxi and travel to Katrineholm. After about an hour, the man was brought back to the hospital.
- 6 September 2005: A 42-year-old man, sentenced to care for, among other offenses, threats against a public official and attempted aggravated assault, escaped during unescorted leave within the hospital grounds. Only an hour after the disappearance was discovered did the hospital alert the police.
- 5 April 2006: A 26-year-old woman, convicted in 1999 of murdering her grandmother, escaped by jumping into a waiting car with her one-year-old daughter. The daughter had been visiting her mother at the hospital on Wednesday accompanied by foster parents.
- 11 May 2007: A man in his 50s, convicted of murder and other violent crimes, absconded while on leave.
- August 2007: A 28-year-old pedophile, convicted of the sexual exploitation of a five-year-old girl and numerous other sexual offenses, escaped for the third time in two years. The man returned voluntarily later the same week.
- 9 September 2008: A 19-year-old man convicted of murder and a 30-year-old man convicted of, among other offenses, attempted robbery escaped from Karsudden. A nationwide alert was issued. They were arrested by police three hours later at a hamburger restaurant in Stockholm.
- August 2010: A 29-year-old man, who had been treated at Karsudden since 2004 after being convicted of attempted murder, escaped and is suspected of having murdered a 57-year-old man while on the run.
- 9 August 2013: A 54-year-old man, convicted of a serious sexual offense in 1987 and held at Karsudden since June 2005, escaped from his escort outside the Kvarnen shopping center in central Katrineholm.
- August 2014: A mentally ill violent offender disappeared from his caregiver during a leave in central Katrineholm. The man was not located until three days later.
- 12 March 2015: A 22-year-old man escaped from his caregivers. After being located by police, he attacked them with a knife and was subsequently shot in the arm and leg.
- 21 July 2015: A man absconded during unescorted leave on the hospital grounds and attempted to escape by swimming out into the nearby Lake Lilla Näsnaren. Police located the man after a couple of hours.
- 27 February 2016: A 44-year-old triple murderer who had unescorted leave absconded from the place he was supposed to be at and was wanted by the police.
- 16 June 2017: A 41-year-old man convicted in 2011 of a number of sexual offenses against 13 children, including aggravated rape, absconded after unescorted leave on the hospital grounds.
- 15 September 2021: Staff were attacked by two patients who had armed themselves with improvised weapons and barricaded themselves in an airlock between wards. The police's special response unit intervened. No one was seriously injured.

== Notable patients ==
- Christer Pettersson, murderer
- Gunnar Palmroth, mass murderer
- Isakin Drabbad, cannibal
- John Svahlstedt, serial rapist
- Matija Sovdat, triple killer
- Roger Karlsson, spree killer
- Sigvard Thurneman, murderer
- Stig Bergling, spy
- Vartti Isberg, murderer
