= Brandbergen murders =

1980 crime in Sweden

- Brandbergen (Stockholm)
- Location: 59.17124°N 18.16943°E; Brandbergen, Haninge Municipality, Stockholm County, Sweden
- Date: c. 04:00 a.m. (CET)
- Target: Finnish Roma family
- Attack type: Shooting, stabbing
- Weapons: Pistol, knife
- Deaths: 4
- Victims: 4
- Perpetrator: Gunnar Palmroth (Note: Sometimes spelled Gunnari Palmroth.)
- Verdict: Guilty
- Convictions: Murder

The Brandbergen murders refers to the mass murder which occurred on 8 September 1980 in the suburb of Brandbergen in Haninge Municipality, Stockholm County, Sweden. On the evening of 7 September 1980, four Finnish adults gathered in a small ground-floor apartment in Brandbergen, including siblings Dagmari and Väinö Berg, members of a Finnish Roma family that had already suffered multiple tragedies, with several siblings previously murdered. Also present was Gunnar Palmroth, a 22-year-old Finnish Roma man with a long criminal record, a history of alcoholism, and serious mental health issues. Just ten days earlier, Palmroth had been conditionally released from Karsudden Hospital, where he had been held for a year following a rape conviction.

During the evening, a dispute broke out in the apartment. Palmroth assaulted the woman at gunpoint, and the weapon discharged, killing her. In a panic, he then turned on the three men, shooting and stabbing them to death. Afterward, he dragged the woman’s body and disposed of it in the building’s elevator shaft. The next morning, a relative discovered the three men’s bodies in the apartment, and the woman’s body was found shortly afterward in the elevator shaft. The killings were carried out with extreme brutality, involving firearms and knives.

Palmroth was arrested on 9 September 1980 in Gothenburg, still wearing clothes stained with the victims’ blood. Initially, authorities suspected multiple perpetrators and even detained his fiancée, but it was soon established that Palmroth had acted alone. During the investigation, it emerged that his mental state was highly unstable, leading the National Board of Health and Welfare to recommend a full psychiatric evaluation before trial. Palmroth’s trial, originally scheduled for December 1980, was postponed to early 1981. On 11 March 1981, Handen District Court sentenced him to institutional psychiatric care and permanently deported him from Sweden.

More than twenty years later, on 12 January 2001, Vartti Isberg, the 36-year-old son of Väinö Berg, tracked down and killed Palmroth outside Stockholm Central Station in an act of revenge for the murders of his father and aunt. Palmroth was shot multiple times in a public area, with numerous witnesses present. A woman accompanying him was injured but survived. Isberg fled the scene but later turned himself in to authorities. He was sentenced to institutional psychiatric care with special discharge review and lifelong deportation from Sweden. He was released and deported to Finland in 2002.

== 1980 mass murder ==
=== Murder ===
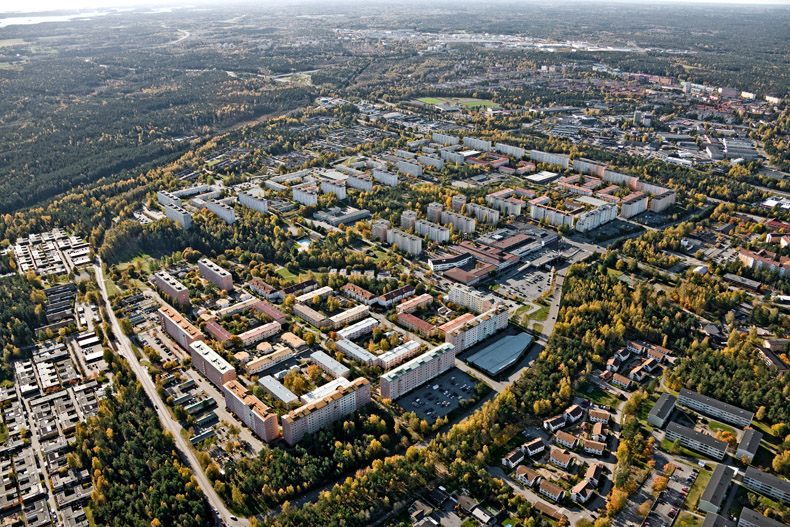
Aerial view of Brandbergen in 2010. Jungfruns gata 401 is the fourth street from the left in the middle of the picture.

On the evening of Sunday, 7 September 1980, four people gathered in a small ground-floor apartment at Jungfruns gata 401 in Brandbergen, south of Stockholm. Three young men and a woman – the sister of one of them – spent the evening drinking together. All four were Finnish, between 25 and 35 years old. The Berg siblings came from a Finnish Roma family that had already suffered repeated tragedies; several of their brothers and sisters had previously been murdered. (Note: The information about two dead brothers came from 1980. An article from 2025 states that five of Väinö's eight siblings were murdered.)

Among those present was Gunnar Palmroth, a 22-year-old Finnish Roma man who was not related to the siblings. He had a history of alcoholism and a long criminal record. Just ten days earlier, on 27 August 1980, he had been conditionally released from Karsudden Hospital, where he had been held for a year after being convicted of rape.

Around 6 p.m., a fight broke out outside the apartment building. Witnesses reported hearing shouting and intermittent gunfire throughout the night, but no one contacted the police. The disturbances went on into the early morning hours.

According to police reconstructions, Palmroth’s fiancée, who had also been in the apartment, left late that night to care for their infant. Left behind were Palmroth, the three men, and the woman. Once the men had fallen asleep, Palmroth forced the woman to have sex with him at gunpoint. During the assault, the gun went off, killing her. When the three men woke and tried to intervene, Palmroth turned on them in desperation. He shot, stabbed, and slit their throats, leaving them to bleed to death in the apartment. He then dragged the woman’s body out and dumped her into the building’s elevator shaft. Investigators later concluded she was already dead at that point.

The murders were discovered the next morning, 8 September 1980, when a relative visited the apartment. Inside, the three men were found dead in the same room. Shortly afterward, the woman’s body was located in the elevator shaft. The killings were carried out with extreme brutality, using a gun, knives, and likely even an axe.

=== Preliminary investigation and arrest ===
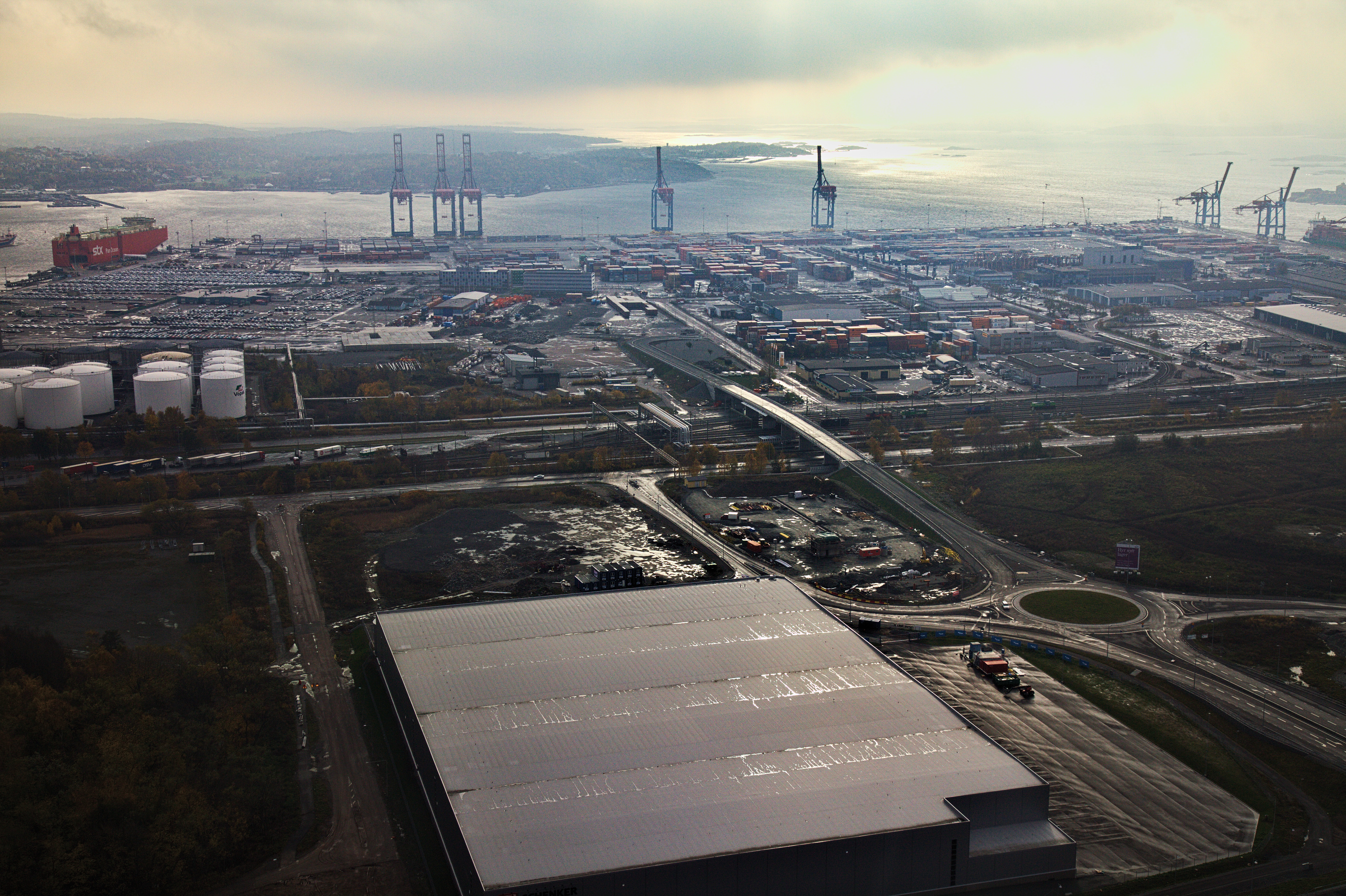
Skandiahamnen in Gothenburg (pictured in 2013) where Palmroth and his fiancé were arrested after the murders.

Police in Handen were alerted just before 8:30 on Monday morning by a security guard. At least one bullet had passed through a window at the back of the building, though it appeared to have been fired from outside into the apartment. The tenant, initially suspected to be among the dead, was later found alive that same day. He was questioned by police but released after it became clear he had been elsewhere at the time of the fight and killings.

A door-to-door inquiry in the neighborhood quickly turned up reports that a car had been seen leaving Brandbergen’s center early that morning. Suspicion fell on a Mercedes. By 9 September 1980, the investigation had advanced enough for a nationwide alert to be issued for a specific vehicle. At the same time, Chief Prosecutor Claes Edlund ordered the arrest of a 22-year-old man and his fiancée on suspicion of involvement. The couple had been seen during the brawl leading up to the murders and had previously lived in Brandbergen themselves. The search paid off quickly. A police patrol in Gothenburg spotted the car on Hisingen, near the ferry terminal at Skandiahamnen. The vehicle was stopped, and Gunnar Palmroth was arrested together with his 20-year-old fiancée and their infant child. He was still wearing a shirt, trousers, and underwear stained with the victims’ blood.

On 10 September police announced they believed Palmroth had acted alone. That same evening, he and his fiancée were transported under heavy secrecy and tight security to Handen police station, amid fears that relatives of the victims might attempt revenge. At first, investigators suspected that several perpetrators had been involved, and Palmroth’s fiancée was also detained. But it soon became clear that Palmroth had committed the murders by himself. The young woman, arrested with him in Gothenburg, denied any involvement – even knowledge of the events – in her first interrogation. By the second session, on the afternoon of Thursday, 11 September, she began to make partial admissions. Palmroth, however, excluded her entirely from his confession. She was later released when suspicions against her were deemed too weak.

Police initially suspected the murders might have been linked to a family feud, since both victims and perpetrator were Finnish Roma. Friends and relatives even suggested this in questioning. But the investigation pointed instead to a toxic mix of alcohol, mental illness, and an escalating conflict. On 11 September, Palmroth confessed to the murders during questioning, describing the act as a “moment of madness.” Since he was the only survivor and claimed to have memory gaps, police had to reconstruct much of the sequence through forensic evidence and witness testimony.

On 12 September, Chief Prosecutor Claes Edlund dropped charges against a 20-year-old man who had been wanted in absentia as a suspected accomplice. The man, a relative of Palmroth, had been the subject of an arrest order on 9 September, when police still believed the killings had been carried out by two men together. On 15 September, Chief Prosecutor Claes Edlund requested that Palmroth and his fiancée be remanded in custody. Handen District Court agreed, and the hearing was over quickly as no one objected. According to both their statements at the time, the woman had been in the apartment with Palmroth up until the start of the killings. Beforehand, the couple had gone home together to fetch the weapons later used. However, both claimed she left before he began shooting.

On 16 September, the fiancée was released. She immediately went into hiding to avoid possible revenge attacks. The court ruled that suspicions against her were not strong enough to justify continued detention. Palmroth, however, remained in custody. On 18 September, Handen District Court formally remanded him in custody. The hearing lasted only six minutes, as all parties agreed. Prosecutors were required to file charges against Palmroth within a month. Later in the autumn of 1980, it was decided, on the recommendation of the National Board of Health and Welfare, that Palmroth should undergo a full psychiatric evaluation, as his mental state was considered highly unstable. The trial, originally set for 4 December 1980, was postponed to early 1981.

During the investigation it also emerged that Palmroth had only just been conditionally released from Karsudden Hospital at the end of August 1980. News of his release shocked his relatives, who did not believe he was well and feared something terrible might happen. The hospital had made his release conditional on abstaining from alcohol, but that hope was not fulfilled. Just over a week later, the Brandbergen killings took place.

=== Victims ===
The victims of the Brandbergen murders were as follows:

- Dagmari Rosita Berg-Malm, (Note: Alternately referred to as Dagmar/Dagmari and the middle names as Rosita or Rosita and Margit, and the last name as either Berg or Berg-Malm.) born 24 February 1954 in Finland
- Väinö Valdemar Berg, (Note: Also referred to as Väinö Isberg. His son Vartti who killed Palmroth also bore that surname.) born 7 November 1947 in Finland
- Olavi Antero Mikkonen, born 20 April 1945 in Finland
- Richard Fritz Koistinen, born 29 June 1954 in Finland

All four victims were Finnish. The siblings Dagmari and Väinö were Finnish Roma and came from a family that had previously experienced several acts of violence. Several of their eight siblings had been killed. Dagmari and Väinö are buried at Ruskeasanta Cemetery in Ruskeasanta, Vantaa, Finland. Koistinen was buried on 2 October 1980, at Skogskyrkogården in southern Stockholm.

=== Perpetrator ===
Gunnar Palmroth (2 March 1958 – 12 January 2001), nicknamed "Käppyrä", was also of Finnish Roma descent and born in Finland. He spent much of his childhood in various orphanages. His parents gave him up early, reportedly because he was “more or less mentally deficient or completely crazy,” according to the 1980 preliminary investigation. When the family moved to Sweden, he had completed only one year of Finnish school. His father remained in Finland to serve a multi-year prison sentence for manslaughter and was later disabled after a revenge attack by the victim’s family.

During his youth, Palmroth was convicted of a long series of crimes. At the time of the Brandbergen murders, he had been conditionally discharged from Karsudden Hospital for a rape less than two weeks earlier, on 27 August 1980. Palmroth was described at the time as suffering from alcohol-related damage. He was also the father of an infant just a few months old at the time of his arrest following the murders.

=== Trial and verdict ===
The trial was originally scheduled to begin on 4 December 1980. However, at the proposal of the National Board of Health and Welfare, Handen District Court decided that the perpetrator should first undergo a comprehensive psychiatric evaluation. The trial was therefore postponed to early 1981. Although nearly three months had passed since the incident, no proper interrogation of the perpetrator had been possible. He was in very poor mental condition, and it was unclear whether this was primarily due to his illness or a consequence of his actions.

On 11 February 1981, Palmroth appeared before Handen District Court as a suspect in the murders. The trial was closely guarded by around 30 police officers, as authorities did not rule out the possibility of revenge attacks against the accused.

On 11 March 1981, Handen District Court sentenced Palmroth to institutional psychiatric care for the murders of the four people in Brandbergen. He was also permanently deported from Sweden. Palmroth was expected to be transferred to psychiatric care in Finland within a few months.

== 2001 murder of Palmroth ==
=== Murder ===
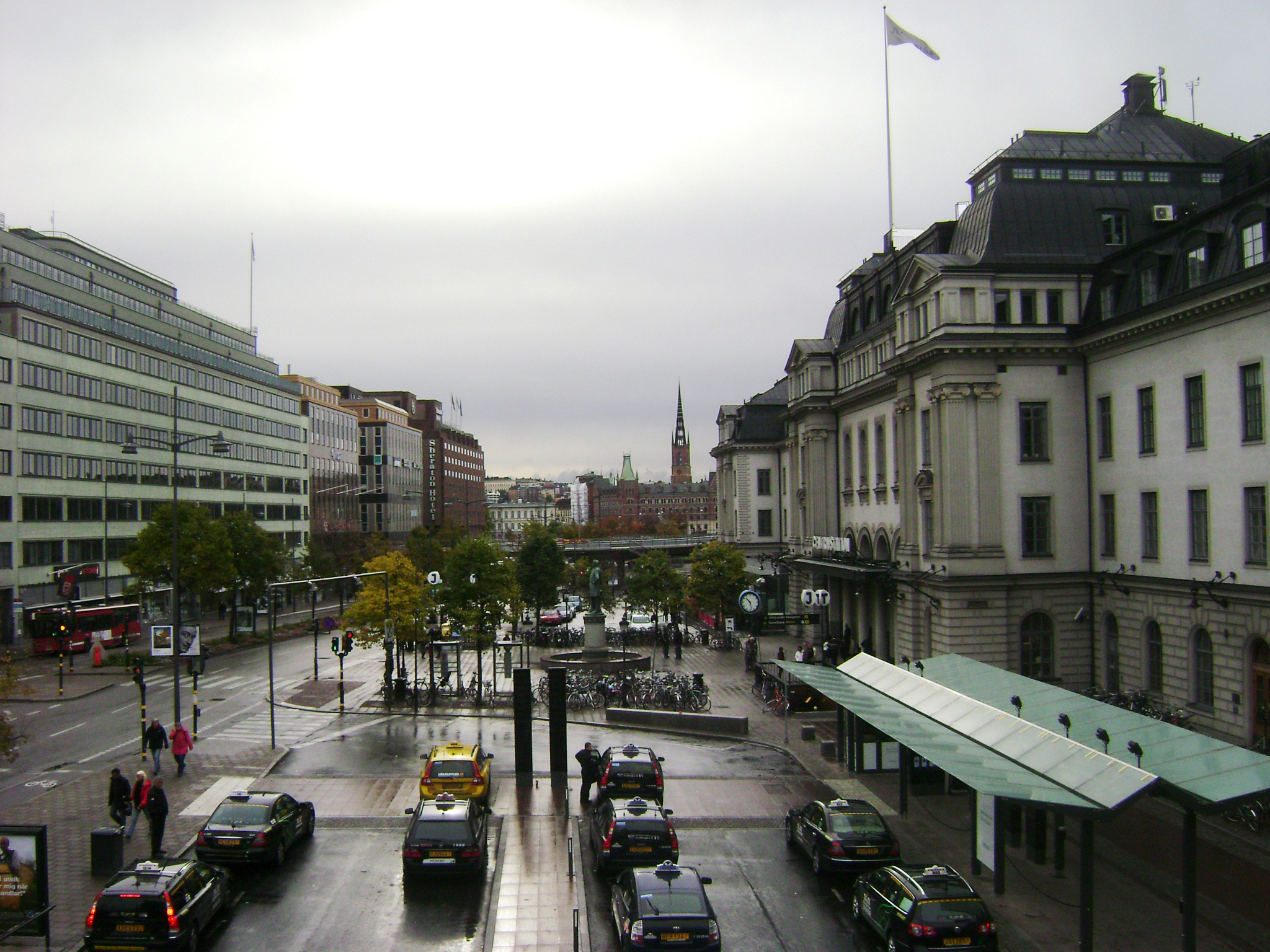
The murder took place at a restaurant on Vasagatan (left), adjacent to Stockholm Central Station (right)

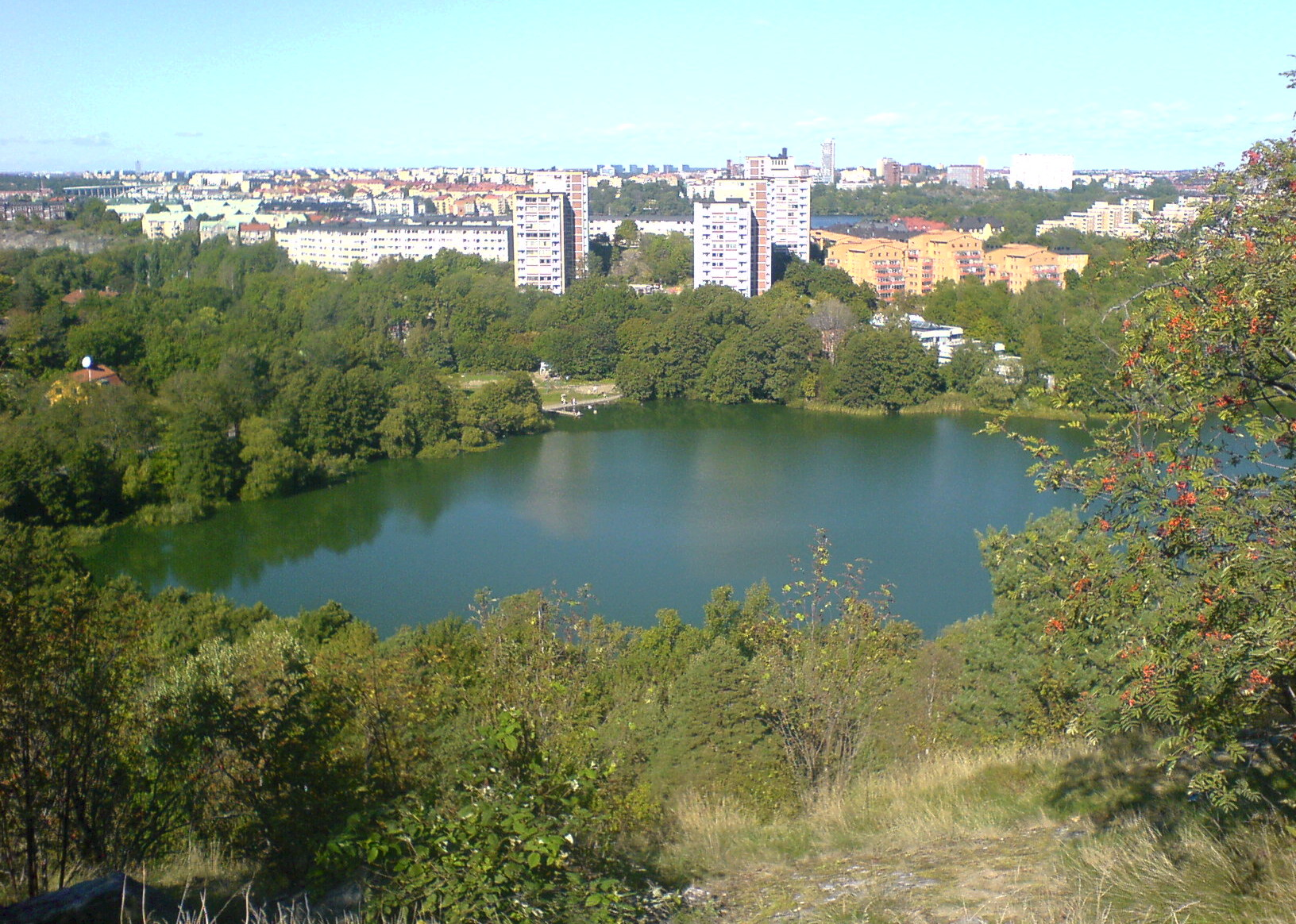
The getaway car was found the same evening near Lake Trekanten

Twenty years earlier, after the mass murder, police had already feared that acts of revenge might one day follow. Following the killings in Brandbergen, Palmroth spent five years in forensic psychiatric care and went on to serve numerous prison sentences for various violent and property crimes. In September 2000, he was released from a lengthy sentence at Hall Prison.

Just a few months later, on 12 January 2001, Palmroth was gunned down outside Stockholm Central Station by Väinö Berg’s 36-year-old son, Vartti Isberg (born 1964). The shooting took place around 8 p.m. on Vasagatan, near the Orientexpressen restaurant adjoining the station. Palmroth and a woman were sitting in a car outside the restaurant when another vehicle pulled up beside them. Isberg stepped out, raised a pistol, and fired repeatedly through the side window in front of some forty witnesses, emptying the magazine. Palmroth was struck several times and died at the scene. His companion, a 49-year-old woman in the passenger seat, was hit in the arm and back but survived. She was rushed to Södersjukhuset hospital, where she underwent surgery before being transferred to intensive care. Once stable, she was able to give her account to the police.

=== Arrest ===
After the murder, Isberg fled in a waiting sports car, heading in the direction of Stockholm City Hall. Around 9 p.m., the getaway car was found abandoned near Lake Trekanten, close to Liljeholmen in southern Stockholm.

The following day, 13 January 2001, Isberg turned himself in to the police and was arrested shortly after 10 a.m. By that time, he had already been formally wanted on suspicion of murder since the early morning hours.

=== Investigation ===
The killer, Vartti Isberg, was the son of Väinö Berg, who had been murdered in Brandbergen, and the nephew of Dagmari Berg, who had been raped and killed. Police suspected that he carried out the shooting as revenge for his father and aunt. Isberg was already known to police and did not speak Swedish. At the time of the murder, most of his family lived in Finland.

According to Aftonbladet, people close to him had long expected something to happen. He came from a family deeply scarred by violence: even before the murders of his father, Väinö, and his aunt, Dagmari, in Brandbergen, three of his father’s other siblings had also been murdered.

On 14 January 2001, Isberg was formally remanded into custody by Stockholm’s duty court, on probable cause of murdering Palmroth at the central station. He was also ordered to undergo a preliminary psychiatric evaluation. Security at the district court was tightened, with several uniformed officers present both inside the courtroom and outside.

=== Trial, verdict and aftermath ===
On 16 July 2001, Isberg was sentenced by Stockholm District Court to institutional psychiatric care (sluten psykiatrisk vård) with special discharge review. In addition to murder, he was convicted of attempted murder and causing danger to another person. Once he had served his sentence, he was to be deported from Sweden for life. He was held at Karsudden Hospital until 8 November 2002. In December that year, Aftonbladet reported that he had been quietly released and deported to Finland. Chief Prosecutor Birgitta Cronier filed a complaint about the case with both the Swedish National Police Board and the National Board of Health and Welfare.

Normally, a person under special discharge review could not be released until the county administrative court had considered the matter after hearing both the prosecutor and the treating physician. But this rule did not apply if the person was also sentenced to deportation. In such cases, it was enough that the doctor, the patient, and the deporting authority—the police—were in agreement. Formally, the police would request that the deportation be carried out, and the doctor would certify that there was no longer a need for care. In practice, however, it sometimes fell to the responsible doctor to inform the police that it was time, which is what happened in this case.

According to his doctor, Karel Kaufner, the decision was a standard procedure: the man’s treatment had been completed, and he had given assurances that he would not return to Sweden. Kaufner also noted that a hospital is not the same as a prison. The prosecutor, by contrast, stated that she was not formally informed of the release. She learned indirectly that the man had been discharged and that police in Nyköping had already carried out the deportation. By then, the responsible doctor at Karsudden Hospital had already informed the police that the man agreed to deportation and that his condition allowed it. Cronier later said that neither she, the investigating police officers, nor the victims had been informed of the deportation, and that many people were now deeply worried for their safety. She also criticized the process as highly irregular, arguing that it was remarkable for a doctor to take the initiative to end the care of someone under special discharge review and arrange it through the police. The incident was referred to the supervisory unit of the National Board of Health and Welfare in Örebro for review.

A check of the population register later revealed, however, that on 10 December 2002, Isberg had registered his new address with Swedish authorities. He was now listed at the Main Post Office in Helsinki.

In October 2024, Isberg released his book Blood Vengeance – The Life of a Gypsy Leader, which details his life in the Finnish underworld and explores the darker aspects of the Finnish Roma community. The book was co-written with journalist Rami Mäkinen and former criminal Omos "Opa" Okoh. In it, Isberg commented on the murder of his father and aunt: "That crime tore our family apart; I couldn’t sleep or think about anything else except that one day I would finish this," and added, "I do not regret the murder I committed. I would have regretted it if I had targeted an innocent person."

== In the media ==
On 9 October 2021, the case was revisited in episode 72 of the podcast Historiska brott.

== See also ==
- List of mass shootings in Sweden
