= Jönsson =

- Pronunciation: Swedish: [ˈjœ̌nːsɔn]
- Language: Swedish, Icelandic

Origin
- Meaning: Son of Jöns

Jönsson is a Nordic, mostly Swedish surname. Notable people with the surname include:

- Alexander Achinioti-Jönsson (born 1996), Swedish footballer
- Anita Jönsson (born 1947), Swedish politician
- Bengt Jönsson (athletics coach) (born 1958), Swedish athletic trainer
- Bengt Jönsson (Oxenstierna) (1390s–1450s), Swedish statesman and noble
- Bengt Jönsson (swimmer) (born 1955), Swedish swimmer
- Christine Jönsson (born 1958), Swedish politician
- Claus Jönsson (1930–2024), German physicist
- Egon Jönsson (1921–2000), Swedish footballer
- Emil Jönsson (born 1985), Swedish cross country skier
- Jan Jönsson (born 1960), Swedish footballer and coach
- Johanna Jönsson (born 1982), Swedish politician
- Jon Jönsson (born 1983), Swedish footballer
- Jörgen Jönsson (born 1972), Swedish ice hockey player
- Kenny Jönsson (born 1974), Swedish ice hockey player
- Lars Jönsson (film producer), Swedish film producer
- Mona Jönsson (born 1951), Swedish politician
- Niclas Jönsson (born 1967), Swedish race car driver
- Olle Jönsson (born 1955), Swedish singer
- Pär-Gunnar Jönsson, Swedish badminton player
- Tommy Jönsson (born 1976), Swedish footballer

== See also ==
- Johnson (surname)
- Jonsson
- Jónsson
