= Region Sörmland =

Regional council of Södermanland County, Sweden

Coordinates: 58°45′18″N 17°00′12″E

- Regional Council
- Logo
- Formation: 1863
- County: Södermanland County
- Country: Sweden
- Website: regionsormland.se

Legislative branch
- Legislature: Regional Council
- Assembly members: 65

Executive branch
- Chairman of the Regional Executive Board: Monica Johansson
- Headquarters: Nyköping

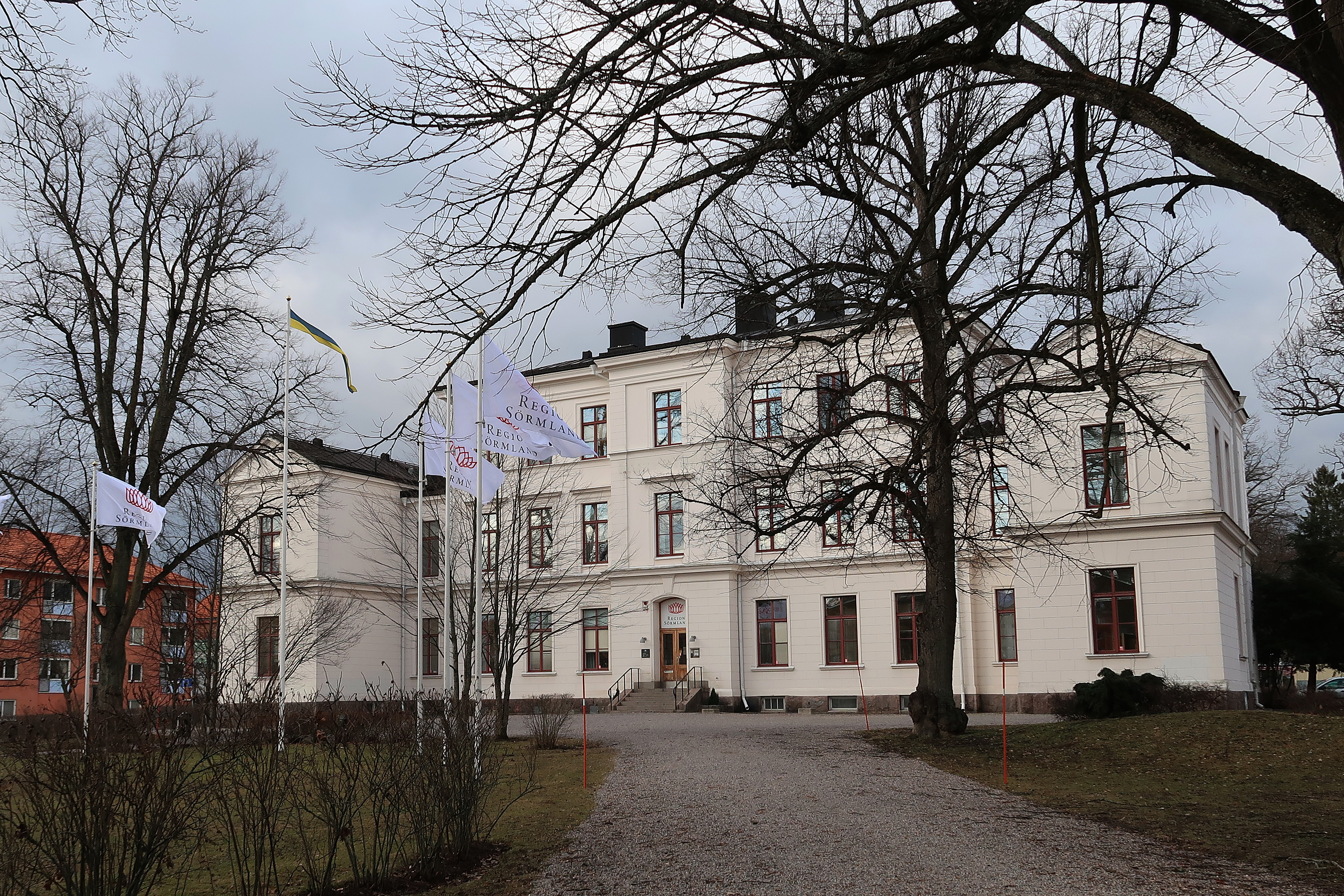
Region Sörmland head office in Nyköping

Region Sörmland, formerly the Södermanland County Council (Swedish: Södermanlands läns landsting) is the regional council for Södermanland County, Sweden. The Region is primarily responsible for healthcare, public transport, and regional development, including cultural affairs.

== Conversion from County Council to Region ==
On 1 January 2019, Landstinget Sörmland was renamed Region Sörmland. In addition to its previous responsibilities, the Region took over infrastructure planning and the role of the regional public transport authority.

== Responsibilities ==
=== Hospitals ===
- Karsudden Regional Hospital, Katrineholm (forensic psychiatry)
- Kullbergska Hospital, Katrineholm
- Mälarsjukhuset, Eskilstuna
- Nyköping Hospital
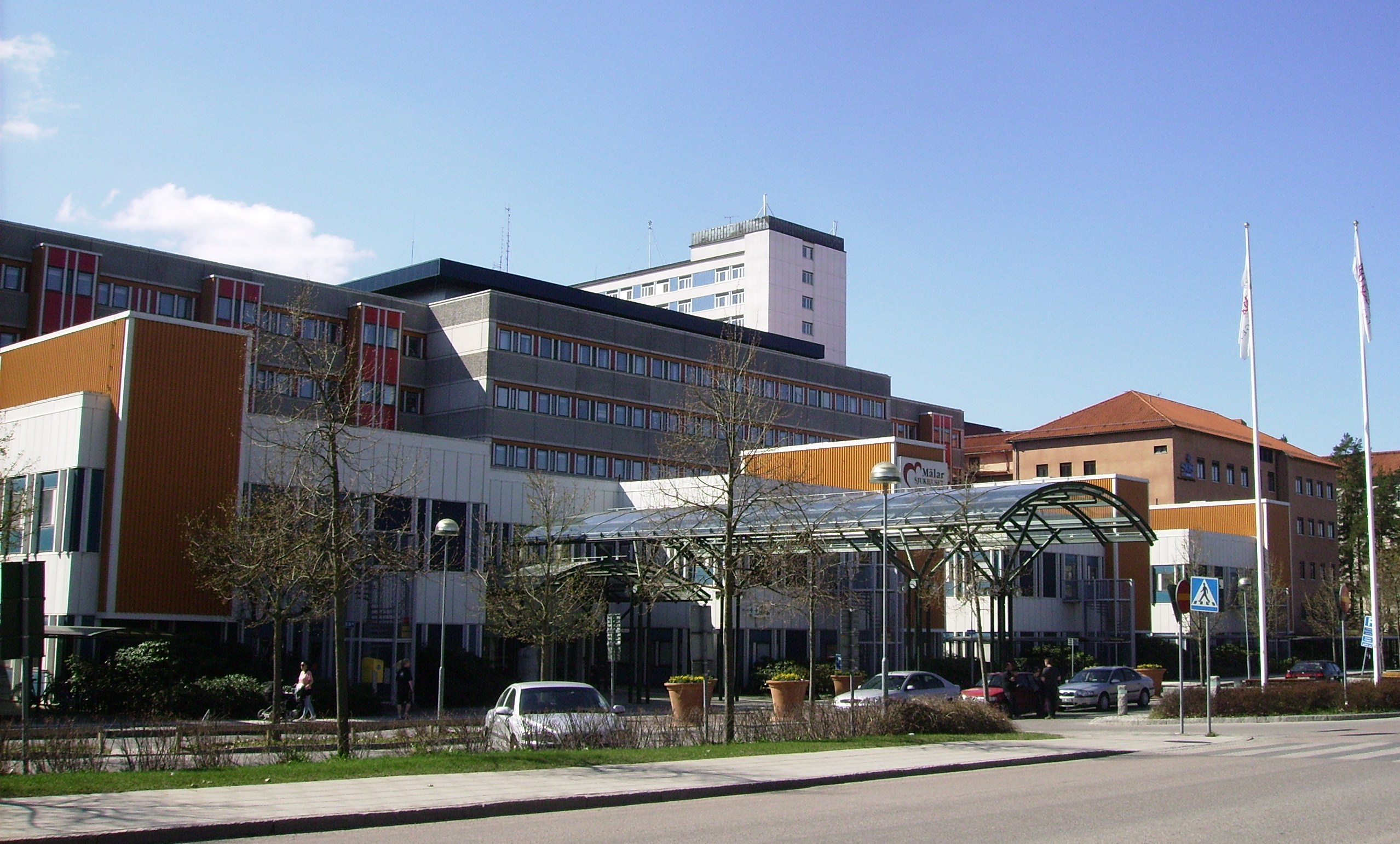
Mälarsjukhuset, Eskilstuna

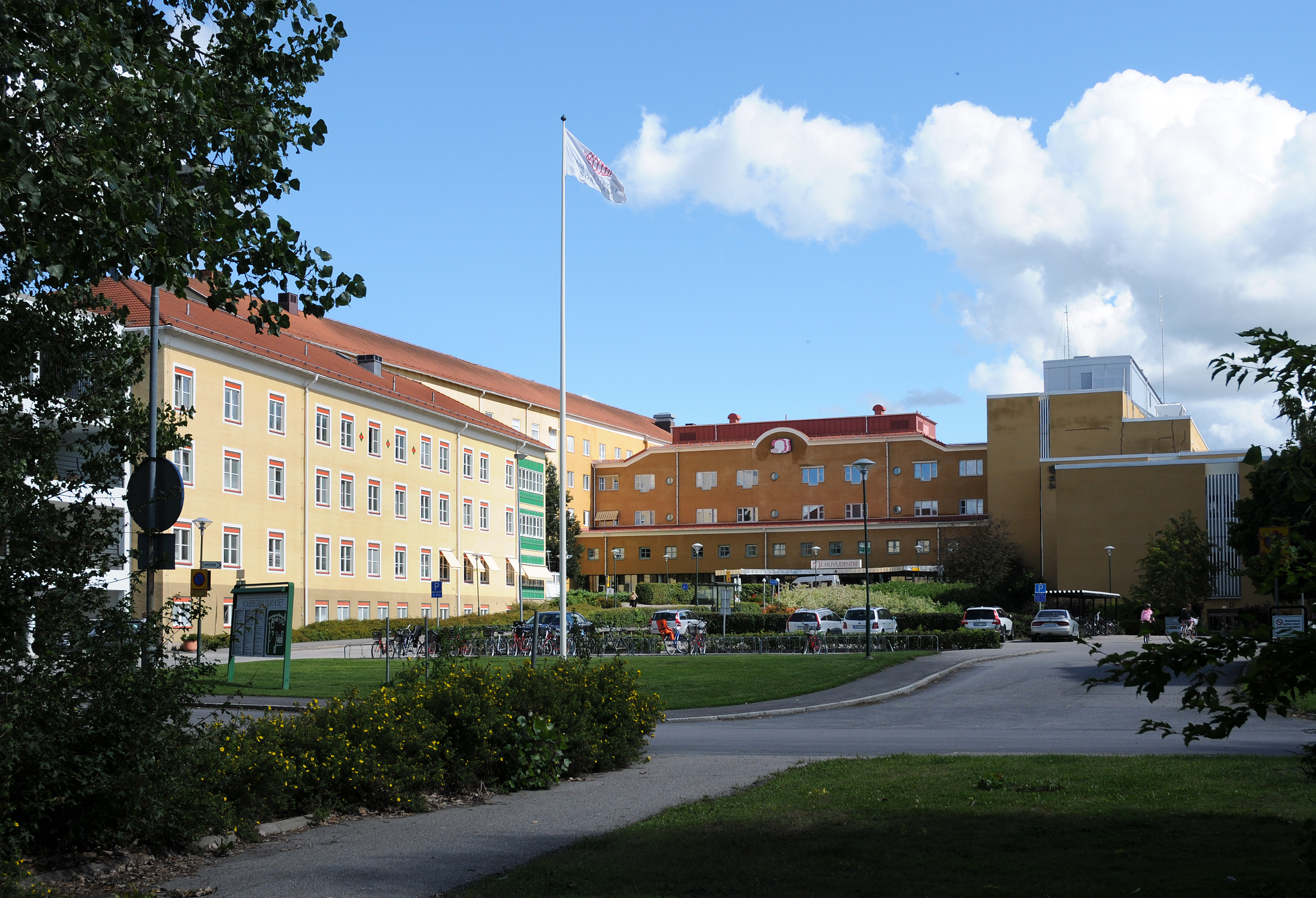
Kullbergska Hospital, Katrineholm

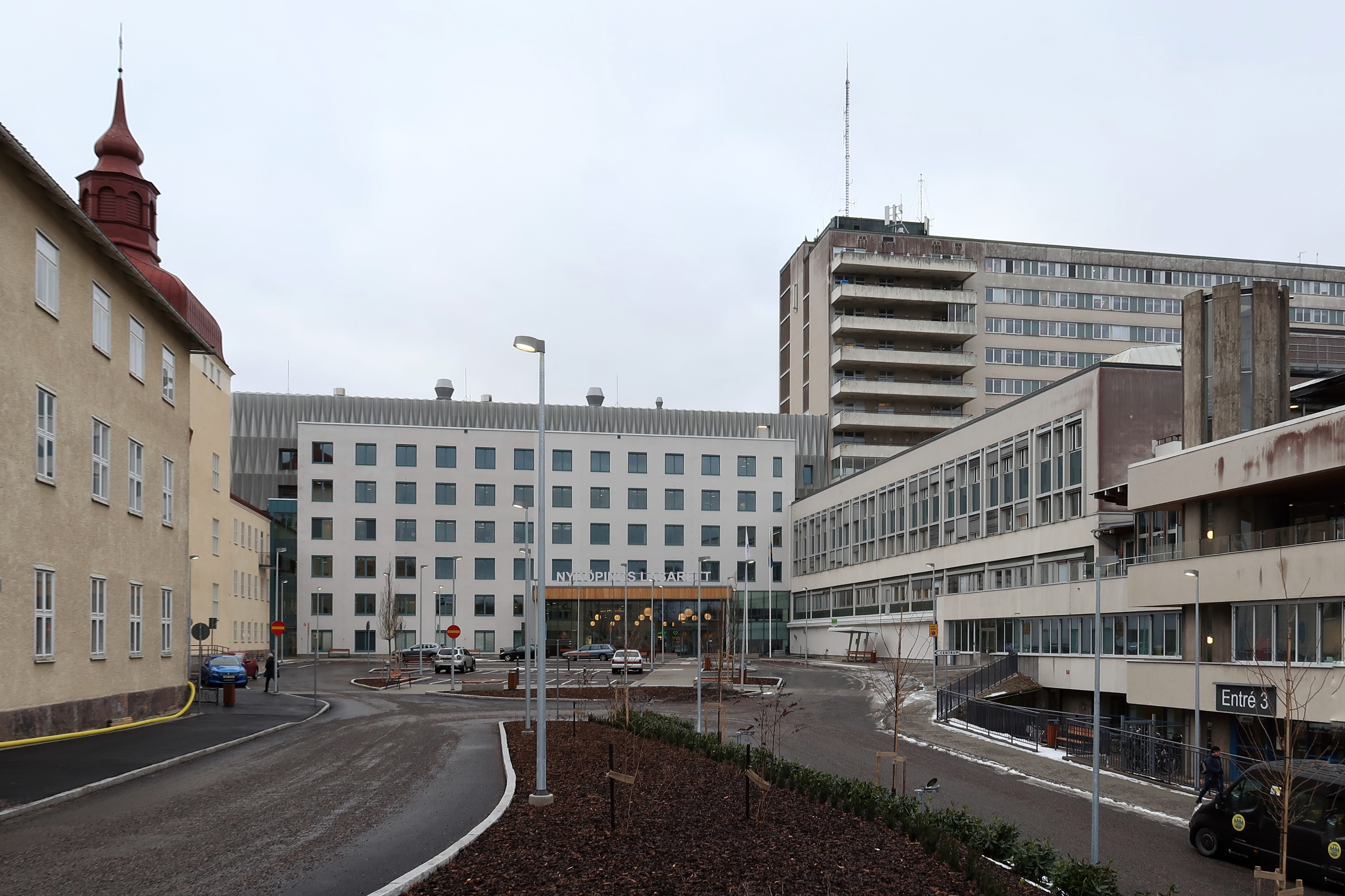
Nyköping Hospital

=== Public transport ===
Region Sörmland is the regional public transport authority under the brand Sörmlandstrafiken.

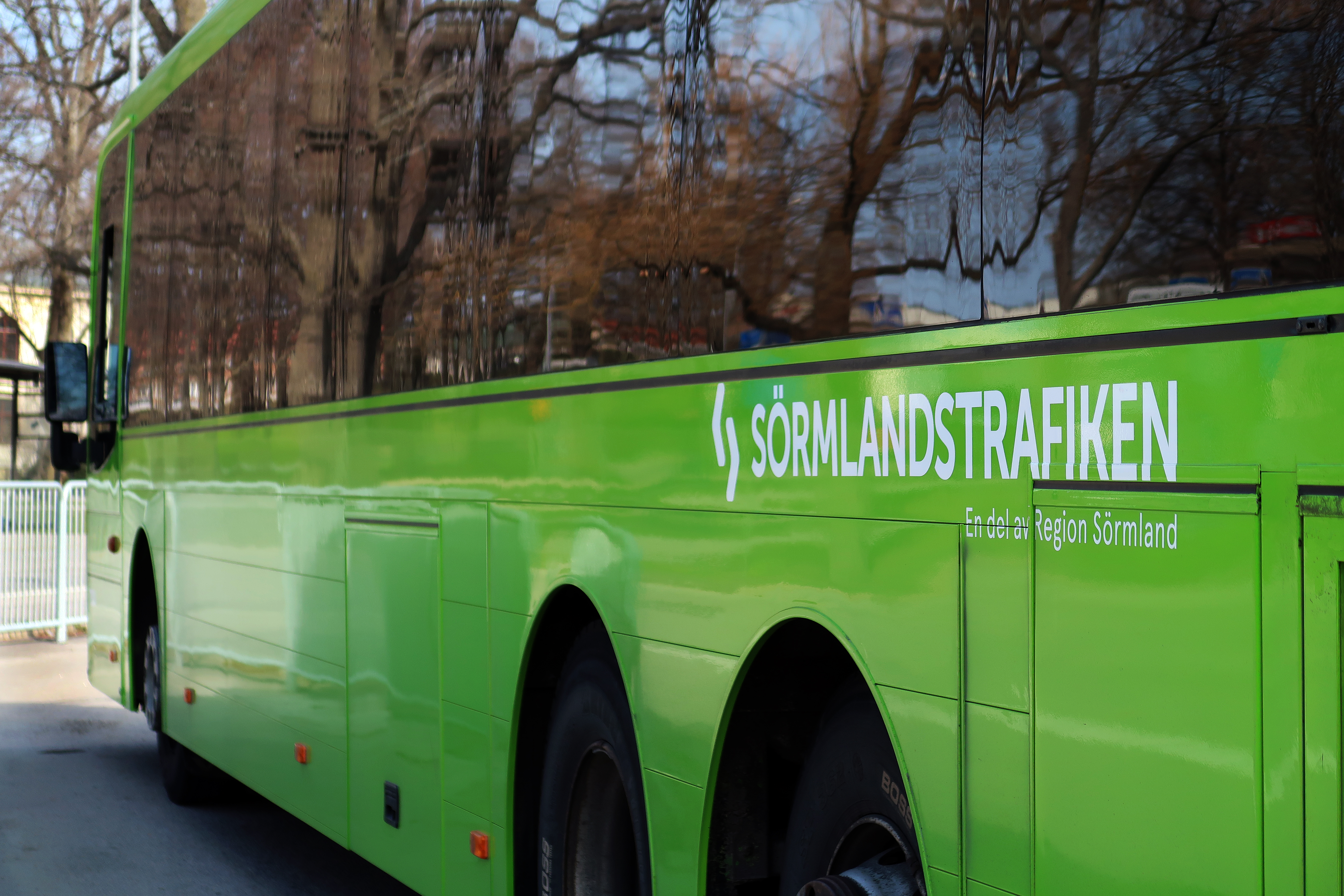
Sörmlandstrafiken bus

=== Culture and education ===
Region Sörmland manages cultural and educational institutions, including:

- Nynäs Castle
- Åsa Folk High School
- Eskilstuna Folk High School
- Sörmland Museum
- Scenkonst Sörmland
- Sörmland Library Development

The Region participates in the Swedish Cultural Collaboration Model and provides grants for cultural organisations.

== Organisation ==
Region Sörmland is governed by the Regional Council, with 79 elected members.

=== Regional Executive Board ===
List of Regional Executive Board Members
Name	Position	Party
Monica Johansson	Chairman	Social Democrats
Jacob Sandgren	Executive Board Member	Social Democrats
Jonas Lindeberg	Executive Board Member (Healthcare)	Vård för Pengarna
Louise Wiklund	Executive Board Member (Personnel)	Vård för Pengarna
Mattias Claesson	Executive Board Member (Public Transport)	Centre Party

=== Electoral Districts ===
Region Sörmland is divided into four electoral districts:

- Nyköping, Oxelösund, Gnesta, and Trosa
- Katrineholm and Vingåker
- Flen and Strängnäs
- Eskilstuna
