= John Svahlstedt =

Swedish serial rapist (1947–2025)

John Thure Charles Walentin Svahlstedt, later Hadarson (2 May 1947 – 15 February 2025), dubbed Södermannen, Hagamannen and Fönstermannen by the police and media alike, was a Swedish serial rapist active in the areas of Södermalm, Stockholm and Haga, Gothenburg from the 1970s to 1980s.

== Early life ==
Svahlstedt was born on 2 May 1947 in Saint George Parish in the City of Stockholm, Sweden.

== Crimes ==
Armed with a knife and wearing a mask, Svahlstedt first started raping women in Gothenburg's Haga district from 1971 to 1973. When he was arrested, he admitted a total of 13 rapes, and was sentenced to four years of imprisonment for 26 assaults. He then received the nickname "Hagamannen". After his release from prison, he moved to Stockholm.

In the summer of 1982, Svahlstedt resumed his activities in the Södermalm district of Stockholm. His modus operandi was to climb through open windows at night, earning him another nickname - "Södermannen". In 1983, at 35 years old, he was arrested and sent away for forensic psychiatric care at the Karsudden Hospital. He never admitted his guilt, but was still convicted of six counts of rape, two counts of sexual assault, deprivation of liberty, unlawful infringement and fraud. In the same year, he escaped abroad and was put on Interpol's wanted list. Two years later, he was arrested at Arlanda Airport. In 1987, he was discharged from Karsudden Hospital.

In 2013, Svahlstedt was convicted of raping a minor and purchasing child pornography, after raping a young girl for two years. He was given four years imprisonment for this.

He died on 15 February 2025, aged 77.
