= Hjálmar Jónsson =

Hjálmar Jónsson may refer to:

- Hjálmar Jónsson (1796–1875), poet a.k.a. Bólu-Hjálmar
- Hjálmar Jónsson (footballer) (born 1980)
- Rev. Hjálmar Jónsson (priest), pastor of the parish of Reykjavík Cathedral and former member of the Alþingi

See also:

- Hjalmar Johansson (1874–1957), Swedish swimmer
