= Sköld =

Swedish surname

Sköld is a surname of Swedish origin. It directly translates to the English word "shield". Sköld may refer to:

== People ==
- Gunnar Sköld (1894–1971), Swedish road racing cyclist
- Hannes Sköld (1886–1930), Swedish socialist and anti-militarist
- Johan Sköld (born 1975), Swedish golfer
- Kristian Sköld (1911–1988), Swedish chess player
- Linus Sköld (born 1983), Swedish politician
- Martin Sköld (born 1970), Swedish musician, Kent
- Nils Sköld (1921–1996), Swedish Army lieutenant general
- Per Edvin Sköld (1891–1972), Swedish Social Democratic politician
- Tim Sköld, Swedish musician
- Victor Sköld (born 1989), Swedish footballer
- Yngve Sköld (1899–1992), Swedish composer, pianist and organist

== Other ==
- Skold vs. KMFDM, album with Tim Skold and Sascha Konietzko of KMFDM
- HSwMS Sköld, small river monitor built for the Swedish Royal Skerry Artillery in the late 1860s

== See also ==
- Skiöld
- Skjold (disambiguation)
- Skjöldr
