= Roger Karlsson =

Swedish murderer (born 1968)

- Born: Lars Roger Karlsson; 24 June 1968 (age 58); Falun, Sweden
- Education: Hvitfeldska School
- Occupation: Restaurant worker
- Status: Released in 2004
- Convictions: Murder (3 counts); Attempted manslaughter; Unlawful threat; Theft; Infliction of damage; Gross infliction of damage
- Penalty: Forensic psychiatric care

Details
- Victims: 3
- Span of crimes: 29 January – 1 February 2001
- Country: Sweden
- Location: Gothenburg
- Targets: Ex-girlfriends and a restaurateur
- Weapons: Stone, axe
- Imprisoned at: Karsudden Hospital (2001–2003)

Lars Roger Karlsson (born 24 June 1968) is a Swedish man who committed a series of three murders in Gothenburg in January–February 2001. He grew up in a stable, middle-class environment, performed well in school, and was described as calm, kind, and reliable. After studying natural sciences and spending time as an exchange student in the United States, he built an early career in the restaurant industry and became well known within Gothenburg's nightlife scene. Despite this outward stability, Karlsson later described years of inner turmoil, self-destructive behavior, substance abuse, and increasing emotional instability. His plans to open his own restaurant collapsed after failed business ventures and bankruptcies in the late 1990s, leaving him financially ruined, deeply embittered, and psychologically fragile.

Between 29 January and 1 February 2001, during a period of heavy alcohol and amphetamine use, Karlsson killed three people who were all personally close to him: his former girlfriend Maria Domingues, whom he strangled and bludgeoned at Albatross Golf Club; another former partner, Cecilia Berglund, whom he killed with an axe in her apartment; and restaurateur Lars Hansson, whom he attacked with an axe in broad daylight on a central Gothenburg street.

After the third killing, Karlsson surrendered to police without resistance. He confessed to all three murders but claimed fragmented memory and was unable to give clear motives, particularly for the killings of the two women. Psychiatric evaluations concluded that he had been suffering from a severe psychotic disorder at the time of the crimes. In June 2001, Gothenburg District Court found him guilty of three counts of murder but sentenced him to compulsory forensic psychiatric care rather than imprisonment.

Karlsson responded quickly to treatment. Within little more than a year, his condition was considered significantly improved, and courts began granting him increasing degrees of freedom. Already in late 2002 he was allowed to move freely within the hospital grounds, and in early 2003 he was granted unescorted leave outside the hospital. Despite objections from the prosecutor, appellate courts ruled that his treatment had been highly successful and that the risk of reoffending was considered low. By the autumn of 2003—less than three years after the murders—Karlsson was effectively living in the community on continuous leave under strict conditions, while formally remaining under psychiatric care.

Medical assessments concluded that Karlsson had suffered an acute psychotic break at the time of the killings, exacerbated by long-term substance abuse and fixation on perceived betrayals. He later expressed remorse, acknowledged the suffering he caused, and stated that he wished to live a quiet, ordinary life away from Gothenburg, accepting that he would remain under long-term psychiatric supervision.

== Early life ==
Karlsson was born on 24 June 1968 in Falu Kristine Parish in Falun, Sweden. In 1971, his family moved to Gothenburg. Shortly thereafter, his parents divorced, and his father relocated to Stockholm. Throughout his upbringing, Roger Karlsson lived alone with his mother in an apartment in Mölndal and had only sporadic contact with his father. He had no siblings, and his mother never remarried. According to a personal background investigation conducted by the Swedish Prison and Probation Service in the early 1990s, Karlsson described his childhood as safe, stable, and harmonious. The family had a good financial situation. His mother worked in the restaurant industry and held several managerial positions. Karlsson reported that he had little difficulty at school, both academically and socially. School staff later interviewed by Aftonbladet described him as a considerate and helpful student with a strong interest in history and religion. One school employee stated that Karlsson was known for assisting his classmates.

Karlsson attended the natural science program at Hvitfeldska Upper Secondary School in Gothenburg. He graduated with an average grade of 4.5 and spent one year as an exchange student in the United States. Former classmates described him as calm and gentle, stating that he "looked like Jesus" and was one of the quietest students in the class. Alongside his studies, he worked part-time as a bartender.

During the trial following the murders, Karlsson described a different internal reality. He stated that for approximately 16 years he had struggled with self-destructive behavior, including attempts to jump from windows and repeated acts of self-harm. He said that he was at times frightened by his own aggressiveness. He described a gradual escalation, noting that the violence had previously been directed toward himself and inanimate objects rather than others.

== Career ==
After graduating, Karlsson discontinued further academic studies. He did not complete his compulsory military service and was exempted in 1991 for medical reasons. He initially worked at Volvo Cars, later as a substitute teacher, and eventually transitioned into the restaurant industry. His first position in the industry was as a bartender at Brasserie Julien in Gothenburg. He quickly became popular among both guests and colleagues and developed a strong reputation in the local nightlife scene. Former coworkers described him as exceptionally kind, reliable, and well liked. Karlsson aspired to open his own restaurant. After Brasserie Julien, he worked at several venues in Gothenburg, including O'Learys, Dailys, and the nightclub Harleys. Former colleagues described him as a workaholic with a strong sense of responsibility and sound financial habits. At the age of 23, he earned approximately 250,000 SEK annually and purchased a new Volvo. He consistently saved money to finance his own business venture.

In 1995, restaurateur Lars Hansson contacted Karlsson and proposed that they open the nightclub Harleys in Halmstad together. Karlsson and Hansson had known each other for many years; Hansson had previously employed Karlsson, and they later became business partners together with Hansson's partner. The venture faced severe financial difficulties and ultimately failed after a few years. Karlsson declared personal bankruptcy in 1997, while their jointly owned company was declared bankrupt in August 1998, with claims totaling approximately three million SEK. According to industry sources, Karlsson became embittered, believing that he had borne the financial losses while Hansson avoided consequences. Karlsson did not appear at bankruptcy court hearings, reportedly due to illness. Investigators concluded that the company's share capital had been consumed well beyond legal limits and noted that criminal offenses related to inventory could not be ruled out.

After the bankruptcy, Karlsson returned to Gothenburg, where he worked as a bartender and was regarded as a "yuppie bartender." He later ran a catering business supplying, among others, Konsum and 7-Eleven, but the contracts were lost and the business collapsed. He took temporary jobs, including at Albatross Golf Club, while continuing to plan new ventures in the restaurant industry. In the spring of 2001, Karlsson planned to start over by opening a café in Linnéstaden, demonstrating his continued ambition to reestablish himself in the food and beverage industry despite previous financial setbacks.

Karlsson was unmarried and had no children. He had a girlfriend at the time of the investigation. Karlsson appeared in eleven entries in the criminal record since 1984, four of which are fines for minor offenses. The most serious crimes prior to the murders in 2001 were committed in 1991: assault, unlawful threats, and theft. The following year, in 1992, he was sentenced to one month in prison. Just over a year before the murders, he was charged with criminal damage and unlawful possession of an object in a public place; the Gothenburg District Court sentenced him to 50-day-fines. The most recent conviction dated from May 2000, when he drove a car without wearing a seat belt. He was then ordered to pay a fine of 300 kronor.

== Murders ==
=== First murder ===
Tee for hole 10 at Albatross Golf Club in Hisingen where the body was found.

On Monday, 29 January 2001, Roger Karlsson worked as usual at the restaurant at Albatross Golf Club in Gothenburg. For approximately six months, he had secretly consumed alcohol on a daily basis. He and his girlfriend planned to open a sushi kitchen, but that day the bank informed them that they would not receive a rental guarantee. At the same time, municipal environmental authorities confiscated food he had delivered to an ICA store. He was also suffering from persistent toothache. Before visiting the dentist, Karlsson purchased beer and spirits and drank heavily. He later stated that he had already begun fantasizing about acts of violence. That same day, he falsely told a taxi driver that he had served eight years in prison for attacking someone with an axe.

That evening, Karlsson met his former girlfriend, 29-year-old Maria Domingues, at Restaurant Gambero. Afterward, they went to the closed and unlit restaurant at Albatross Golf Club to continue drinking. Karlsson later stated that his memory of the events was fragmented. At dawn, he found himself lying on the golf course with Maria beside him and a large blood-stained stone nearby. He realized that she was lifeless. He later recalled strangling her and repeatedly striking her head with the stone, killing her. He hid her body in a rhododendron bush near the tenth tee and changed his trousers.

During the night, Karlsson entered the golf club building using a key he had retained from earlier employment. He took money from a cash register. On Tuesday, 30 January 2001, relatives reported both Karlsson and Maria missing. Maria's body was later discovered in a bush near the tenth tee. She had been strangled and sustained multiple blunt-force injuries to the head. On Wednesday, 31 January 2001 at 21:59, the police issued a missing-person notice for Karlsson and a public alert regarding Maria to all hotels in Gothenburg, but it yielded no results.

=== Second murder ===
Over the next day, Karlsson wandered around Gothenburg, socializing with alcoholics and heavy drinkers, visiting pornographic clubs, taking pills, and buying amphetamines in a park. During this time, he did not contact his current girlfriend. He purchased an axe at B&W, intending to use it against a restaurateur whom he believed had cheated him in a previous business venture. From a payphone, he then contacted his former fiancée, 32-year-old Cecilia Berglund, to whom he had been engaged ten years earlier, and asked if he could stay overnight at her apartment on Norra Gubberogatan in Olskroken, Gothenburg. Karlsson and Berglund had previously been engaged and lived together, but their relationship had ended at Karlsson's initiative. According to Karlsson, there had been no conflict between them. That evening, they sat in her kitchen drinking alcohol and talking. Berglund prepared a bed for him on the sofa, after which Karlsson went to shower. Unable to sleep, he got up and continued drinking, attempting to place the gin bottle down silently so as not to wake her.

Early on Thursday, 1 February 2001, Karlsson murdered Berglund in her apartment while she was asleep. He struck her multiple times with the axe to the head and face. After her death, he sexually violated her body. He later recalled walking across a parking lot and discarding a set of keys, knowing they belonged to her. During police interrogation, when asked about his feelings toward Berglund, he described her as "the best girl in the world" and "an angel." Karlsson was unable to provide any motive for the killing and, as with the other murders, reported significant memory gaps regarding the event.

=== Third murder and arrest ===
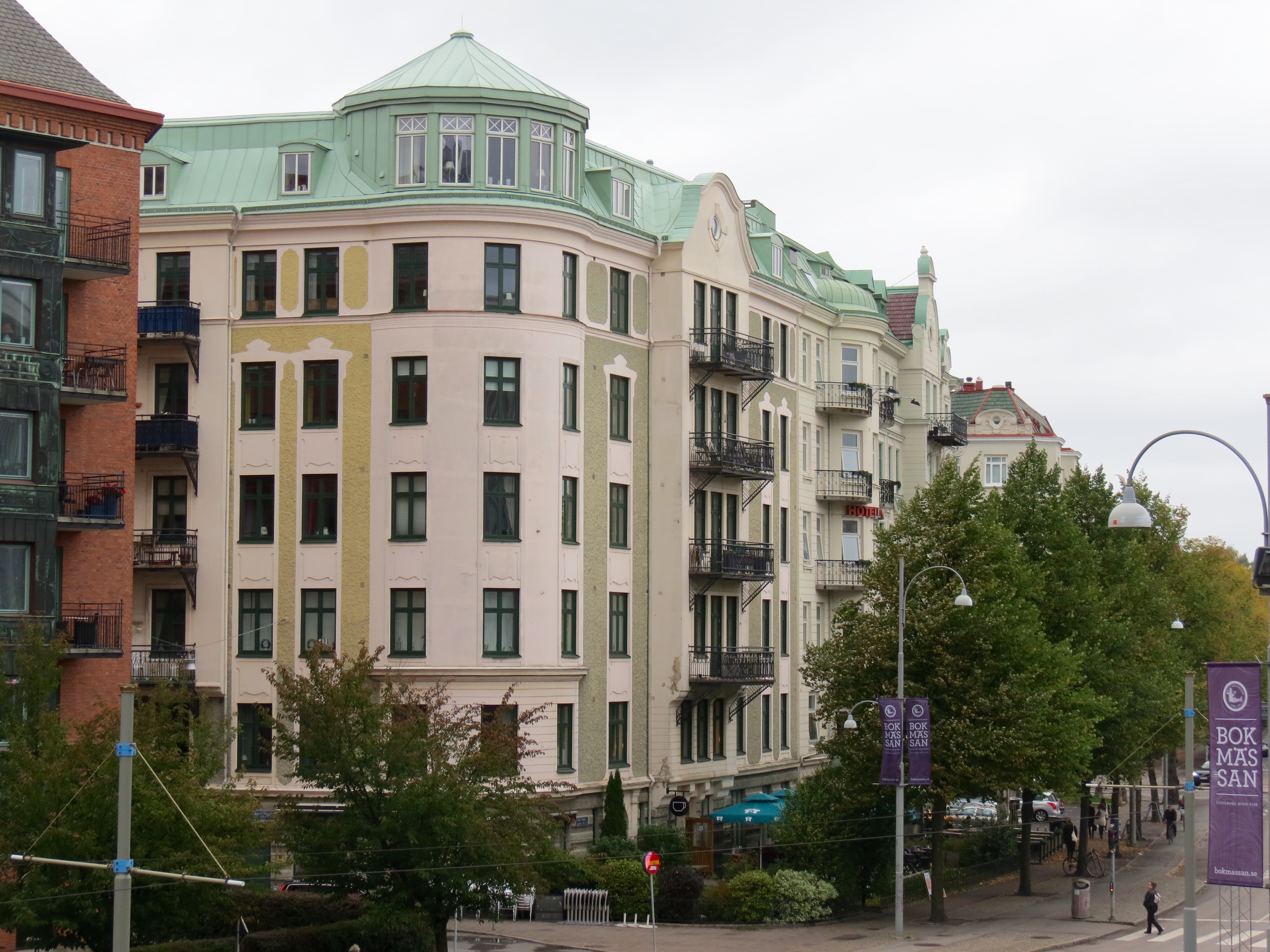
A 2018 photo of the pedestrian crossing (right in the picture) at the intersection of Sten Sturegatan/Skånegatan where the murder took place

On Thursday, 1 February 2001, at approximately 8:30 am, the 56-year-old restaurateur Lars Hansson and his partner left their home on Skånegatan in central Gothenburg. Roger Karlsson had been waiting outside the building, armed with an axe. According to Karlsson's later statements, he had been waiting along the façade near a bush and had been focused entirely on Hansson, whom he blamed for his financial ruin following the restaurant bankruptcy in 1996. When Hansson and his partner appeared, Karlsson began chasing Hansson along Skånegatan during the morning rush hour. Witnesses later testified that the chase moved in and out of building entrances before Karlsson caught up with Hansson at a pedestrian crossing near the intersection of Sten Sturegatan and Skånegatan, close to Scandinavium and Liseberg.

Karlsson struck Hansson repeatedly with the axe, delivering fatal blows to the head. After Hansson collapsed onto the street, Karlsson reportedly stood over him and continued striking. Hansson's partner witnessed the attack and fled into a nearby stairwell. Karlsson briefly pursued her, shouting taunts, before striking the entrance door with the axe. Several witnesses described the scene as chaotic and extremely violent. Motorists stopped their vehicles, and pedestrians fled in panic. One witness attempted to stop Karlsson by driving his car toward him several times, but Karlsson advanced provocatively toward the vehicle, gesturing as if daring the driver to strike him. Karlsson continued along Skånegatan, swinging the axe at passing cars, smashing a side window of a stopped vehicle, and striking shop windows.

Police received an emergency call at 8:36 a.m. reporting an axe-wielding man rampaging along Skånegatan. Multiple patrol cars were dispatched. Witnesses stated that Karlsson continued walking toward the police station, holding the axe, while people around him were unaware of what had just occurred and passed within a few meters of him. When the first police patrol arrived, Karlsson suddenly walked into the street, raised the axe above his head with both hands, and then dropped to his knees. He surrendered without resistance as officers approached with drawn weapons. At the time of arrest, he was covered in blood and still holding the axe.

== Investigation ==
At 12:10 on Thursday, 1 February 2001, Roger Karlsson was interrogated in the detention unit at Gothenburg Police Headquarters, only hours after he had fatally attacked Hansson with an axe. During the initial questioning, he expressed indifference toward the victim's fate, stating that he hoped the man was dead. In extended interrogations that followed, Karlsson gave an account of the preceding days, during which he had killed three people who had all been close to him. During questioning, Karlsson was unable to explain why the two women had also been killed. As the gravity of his actions became clear to him, he expressed intense remorse and despair, stating that he no longer wished to live and that he felt he had destroyed the lives of hundreds of people connected to the victims. He acknowledged that many would want him dead and stated that he understood those feelings.

On the evening of 1 February 2001, police conducted technical forensic examinations at two crime scenes: the golf course at Albatross Golf Club on Hisingen and the apartment in Olskroken where one of the women had been killed. On 2 February 2001, prosecutors formally requested that Karlsson be remanded in custody. Forensic analyses completed on Friday, 2 February 2001 showed that Karlsson had been under the influence of both alcohol and amphetamines at the time of his arrest. In conversations with his defense counsel, he admitted responsibility for all three killings but stated that he could not remember how he had killed the two women. Later that afternoon, police technicians discovered a bloodstained stone near the tee at hole ten at Albatross Golf Club. Investigators believed the stone may have been used to kill the 29-year-old Maria Domingues found there.

On 3 February 2001, Karlsson was formally remanded in custody on probable cause, suspected of three counts of murder. That same day, he met his lawyer, Fredrik Gedda, for the first time in detention. During a lengthy meeting, they attempted to reconstruct the events of the preceding days. Gedda later confirmed that Karlsson had confessed to all three murders. A remand application was submitted to Gothenburg District Court, and closed-door hearings were held in the police headquarters' high-security courtroom. Karlsson stated that he could not provide a clear motive for the killings of the two women and that he did not remember significant portions of the time between the murders. According to his lawyer, Karlsson was in extremely poor psychological condition and required specialist psychiatric care. He was deemed incapable of participating in prolonged interrogations. Karlsson declined contact with relatives and informed his lawyer that, aside from legal counsel, he wished to receive visits only from healthcare personnel and investigators.

Later on 3 February 2001, Karlsson reiterated that he did not remember why he had killed the women and denied harboring any resentment toward them. All three victims, as well as Karlsson himself, were known figures within Gothenburg's restaurant community. Investigators determined that Karlsson may have had additional intended targets. Earlier on the morning of 1 February, he had embedded an axe in the door of another restaurateur's home. Police also seized a letter Karlsson had sent to his current girlfriend, which reportedly contained the names of other individuals he felt wronged by, although these details were not officially confirmed. Karlsson admitted that the three murders had been committed within a span of less than two days and that he had used amphetamines during that period. He told his lawyer that he had felt lost and deeply depressed in the time leading up to the killings. Karlsson's defense attorney, Fredrik Gedda, described him as a desperate individual who had been in poor mental health for an extended period.

In the days following the arrests, Gothenburg District Court prepared to decide whether Karlsson should undergo a comprehensive forensic psychiatric examination. Both the prosecution and the defense supported such an evaluation. The defense argued that Karlsson may have been suffering from a state of severe mental disturbance at the time of the crimes, which would preclude a prison sentence. The prosecution initially maintained that the killings constituted three deliberate murders, committed on separate occasions and at different locations. Investigators noted that Karlsson had been behaving erratically for at least a week prior to the murders and had been absent from his home for several days. He was also burdened by significant personal debt and ongoing substance abuse. Despite these findings, authorities were unable to determine the precise trigger that caused the violence. Prosecutor Bergström stated that something appeared to have occurred on Sunday, 28 January 2001, but that the specific catalyst remained unknown.

Karlsson's criminal history was reviewed as part of the investigation. He had been convicted in 1992 for assaulting and robbing a taxi driver, fined for illegal speeding in 1996, and convicted in 1999 for vandalism and possession of an illegal telescopic baton. On 5 February 2001, Gothenburg District Court formally ordered that Karlsson undergo a full forensic psychiatric evaluation, a process expected to take approximately one month. He was subsequently placed in forensic psychiatric care at the facility in Hisings Backa. During the investigation, Karlsson's mother came under suspicion for protecting a criminal after it emerged that she had concealed and destroyed a letter written by her son. Authorities stated that, had the letter been disclosed earlier, it might have been possible to prevent at least one of the murders. The forensic psychiatric report was scheduled to be completed by 21 May 2001 and would play a decisive role in determining whether Karlsson would be sentenced to imprisonment or compulsory psychiatric care.

Police also reviewed reports of approximately thirty missing persons in Gothenburg filed around 1 February 2001. After cross-checking the names, investigators concluded that none of the additional cases were connected to Karlsson. The preliminary investigation material was described as extremely graphic and remained sealed pending a formal confidentiality review.

== Trial ==
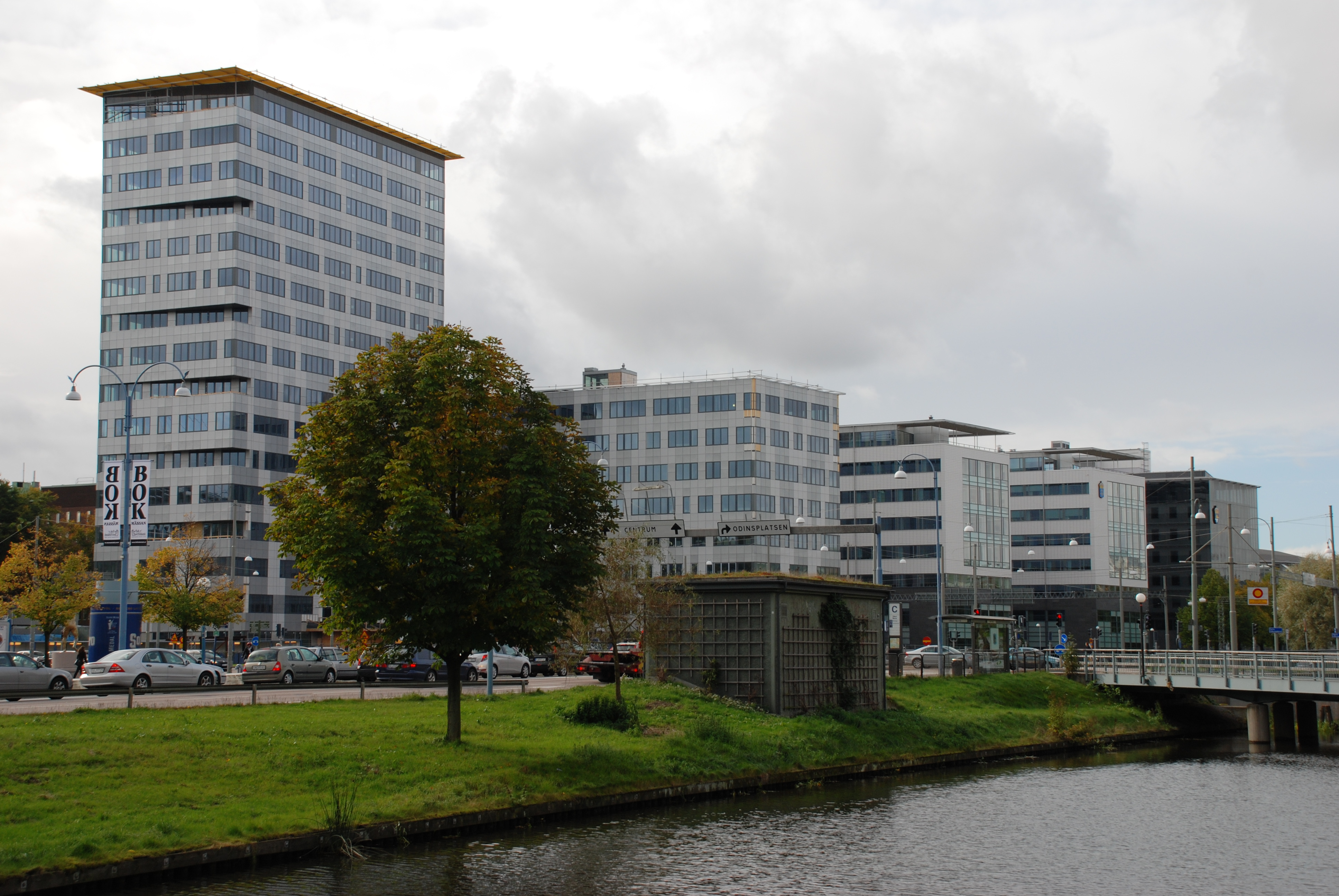
The trial was held at Gothenburg District Court

The trial against Roger Karlsson began on 16 May 2001 at Gothenburg District Court and was held in the court's high-security courtroom. The proceedings were scheduled to last several days due to the seriousness of the charges and security concerns, including the presence of relatives of the victims and extensive media coverage. At the outset, Karlsson appeared calm and composed, with neatly combed hair and a clean-shaven face. He carefully observed the prosecutor, the judges, the audience, and the assembled journalists. However, when one of his oldest friends testified, Karlsson broke down and began to cry uncontrollably. He stated that the events were inexplicable to him and that the murders had occurred during what he described as an upward phase in his life.

Karlsson's defense attorney, Fredrik Gedda, argued that the acts were motiveless and committed during a state of severe psychological confusion. He emphasized that Karlsson had functioned outwardly in society despite longstanding inner turmoil. The defense further argued that Karlsson may have been suffering from a psychotic condition at the time of the crimes. The prosecution presented extensive evidence, including forensic findings, witness testimony, and Karlsson's own statements. Karlsson was charged with three counts of murder, attempted manslaughter or aggravated unlawful threats against Lars Hansson's partner, and additional counts related to violent threats and property damage against bystanders during the axe attack.

Several witnesses testified about Karlsson's relationships with the victims. Testimony indicated that Karlsson had been particularly disappointed and embittered toward Lars Hansson due to financial disputes, while no clear motive could be identified regarding the murders of the two women. Witnesses described Karlsson as emotionally unstable in the period leading up to the crimes. On 17 May 2001, Karlsson was questioned in detail about the murder of Lars Hansson. He described Hansson as a father figure who had supported him for many years and stated that he had not harbored hatred toward him. He admitted, however, that he must have waited for Hansson outside his residence and acknowledged that chance alone could not explain their encounter that morning. Karlsson described his memories as fragmented and stated that his actions were not the result of rational thought. During the trial, it also emerged that Karlsson had previously been prescribed medication for schizophrenia-like symptoms between 1997 and 1999, although he had never received a formal diagnosis.

On 18 June 2001, Gothenburg District Court found Roger Karlsson guilty of murder, attempted manslaughter, unlawful threats, theft, infliction of damage, and gross infliction of damage. He was sentenced to forensic psychiatric care with special discharge review and ordered to pay damages exceeding one million SEK. The court concluded that Karlsson had committed the crimes while suffering from a severe mental disorder and that his recollection of the events remained highly fragmented.

== Hospitalization, leave, and gradual release ==
Following his conviction, Roger Karlsson was sentenced to compulsory forensic psychiatric care with special discharge review at Karsudden Hospital in Södermanland. The sentence was based on the conclusion that he had committed the murders while suffering from a severe psychotic disorder. Under this form of care, any decisions regarding leave or discharge required judicial approval, with the prosecutor participating in the review process. Beginning in July 2001, Karlsson underwent continuous psychiatric treatment consisting of regular psychotherapy sessions and psychopharmacological medication. Over a period of approximately 15 months, his condition gradually stabilized. During this time, he also pursued distance studies in behavioral science. According to treating physicians, his mental health improved significantly, and his medication was eventually reduced to antidepressants only.

In November 2002, the County Administrative Court of Appeal in Södermanland County granted Karlsson ground privileges (frigång) within the hospital grounds at Karsudden Hospital. This decision allowed him to move freely within the secured hospital area. In its ruling, the court cited medical assessments stating that Karlsson's mental condition was very good and that his treatment had been highly successful. In January 2003, the County Administrative Court further approved Karlsson's first temporary leave outside the hospital: a two-hour unescorted permission in Katrineholm. The decision was immediately appealed by chief prosecutor Carl Bergström, who argued that there was a risk of relapse and questioned whether the long-term effects of Karlsson's treatment had been sufficiently documented. Bergström also warned that while Karlsson appeared stable within the hospital environment, the risks associated with granting leave in the community were more difficult to assess.

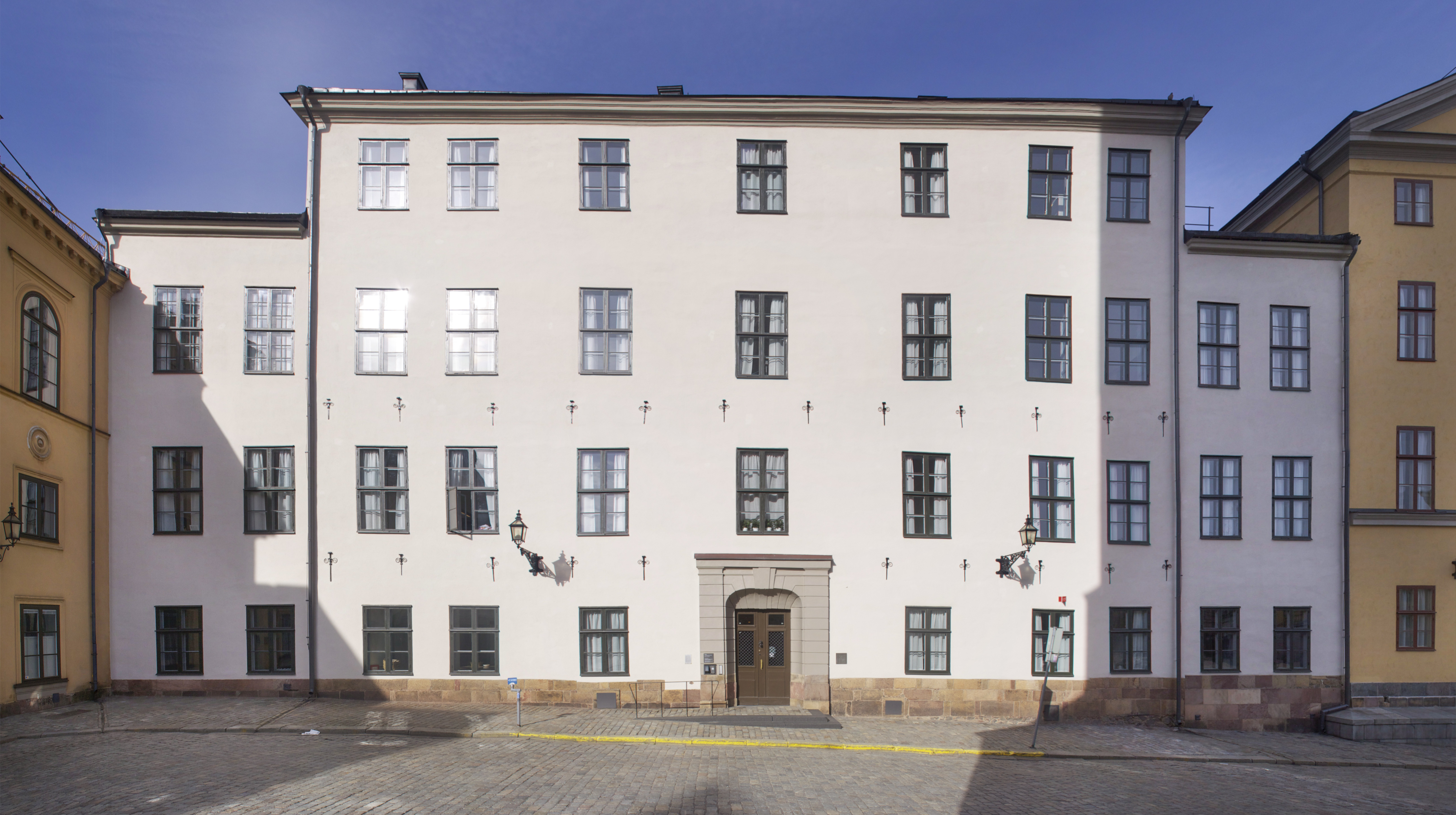
The Administrative Court of Appeal in Stockholm decided to release Karlsson

On 9 April 2003, the Administrative Court of Appeal in Stockholm upheld the lower court's decision and confirmed Karlsson's right to temporary leave. The ruling was not unanimous; one lay judge dissented, expressing doubts as to whether Karlsson's psychological stability had been sufficiently established. In its reasoning, the court emphasized that Karlsson had demonstrated strong motivation for treatment, that the therapy had been very successful, and that he had shown good insight into his condition. The court also noted that he had been granted freedom of movement within the hospital area for several months without incident and that expert medical assessments considered the risk of reoffending during the short leave to be negligible.

Following the appellate ruling, Prosecutor Bergström stated that he was unlikely to pursue further appeals. While he maintained that the issue of leave may have been raised prematurely, he acknowledged that the appellate court's decision was more thoroughly reasoned than that of the lower court and expressed understanding for its conclusions. In September 2003, Karlsson was granted his first additional short-term leave. By November 2003, he was effectively living under continuous unescorted leave, residing in the community while remaining formally under psychiatric care. His permissions were subject to strict conditions, including mandatory availability by telephone, residence requirements, regular urine and blood tests, unannounced checks, and an obligation to report any changes in his circumstances.

In July 2004, Karlsson gave a telephone interview to Aftonbladet while on leave in the city where he was then residing. He stated that he was studying toward an engineering degree and emphasized that he did not consider himself free, noting that his psychiatric care could continue for another 10 to 12 years. He described the level of supervision as extensive and characterized his life as closely monitored despite living outside the hospital. In the same interview, Karlsson addressed the concerns expressed by relatives of the victims regarding his release into the community. He stated that he understood their fear and described the events as an unparalleled tragedy. He acknowledged that his situation could be perceived as deeply unjust by those affected but emphasized that the decisions regarding his leave were made by the courts, not by himself. He explained that only a small number of people in his social circle were aware of his past and that he avoided disclosing it to new acquaintances. He described his life as solitary and focused on education, stating that he hoped to eventually live an ordinary life and reintegrate into society. He also stated that he would never return to Gothenburg.

Medical assessments indicated that Karlsson had suffered a psychotic break on the morning of the murders in February 2001. His long-term substance abuse was considered a contributing factor, as was his fixation on perceived betrayals by the restaurateur he killed. Court documents from the County Administrative Court also referenced underlying psychological issues, including indications of incest-related trauma, as part of the broader evaluation of his mental state.

== Victims ==
- Maria Graciete Martins Domingues (born 13 January 1972), former girlfriend, was murdered at Albatross Golf Club on Hisingen. She was buried on 1 March 2001 at the Eastern Cemetery in Gothenburg.
- Cecilia Berglund (born 1 Maj 1968), former girlfriend, was murdered in an apartment in Olskroken in Gothenburg. She was buried on 26 April 2001 at Kikås Cemetery in Kikås, Mölndal Municipality.
- Lars Hansson (born 5 January 1945), restaurateur, was murdered on a public street at the intersection of Sten Sturegatan and Skånegatan in the Heden district of Gothenburg. He was buried on 23 September at the Eastern Cemetery in Gothenburg.

== See also ==
- Matija Sovdat – triple murderer released after two years
- Sten Fransson – triple murderer released after nine months
