= Mikael Jonsson =

Swedish chef

- Born: 1966 (age 59–60); Sweden
- Culinary career
- Cooking style: French cuisine
- Rating: Michelin stars
- Current restaurant: Hedone
- Website: www.hedonerestaurant.com

Mikael Jonsson (born 1966) is a Swedish chef and former solicitor who is head chef at the restaurant Hedone in Chiswick, West London. Prior to becoming a chef he was also a food blogger. His restaurant was awarded a Michelin star in the 2013 edition of the Michelin Guide.

== Career ==
Jonsson was diagnosed as a teenager as having food allergies to shellfish and raw meat. In order to cook, he was required to take cortisone injections in order to prevent the asthma attacks and the onset of eczema. He initially trained as a chef in Sweden, and subsequently trained as a solicitor. Whilst working as a solicitor started writing a food blog at gastroville.com which documented his reviews of restaurants he visited as he travelled.

At the age of 44, he changed his diet and found it gave him a new-found control over his allergies. He chose to pursue his dream of becoming a chef and opened the restaurant Hedone in Chiswick, West London in 2011. He had never previously worked in a professional kitchen. In October 2011, he chased off a man who was urinating on the delivery door to the restaurant. About ten minutes later a group of people entered the restaurant and attacked Jonsson, who was stabbed in the arm and had to have broken glass removed from his forehead. He received sixteen stitches. The gang were later apprehended by police. Hedone was awarded a Michelin star in the 2013 Michelin Guide, published in October 2012; news of the award was accidentally made public a week early.

== Personal life ==
Jonsson follows a Paleolithic diet to control his allergies, and is also gluten intolerant. Jonsson's favourite restaurant is Kojyu in Japan.
