= Isakin Drabbad =

Swedish murderer and cannibal (born 1978)

- Born: Jimmy Daniel Isaksson; 1978 (age 47–48); Köping, Sweden
- Other names: Skara Cannibal; Isakin Jonsson
- Children: 1
- Status: Released
- Penalty: Forensic psychiatric care
- Capture status: Released (2020)

Details
- Victims: Helle Christensen

Isakin Drabbad (born Jimmy Daniel Isaksson; born 1978), also known as the Skara Cannibal (Swedish: Skarakannibalen), is a convicted Swedish murderer. In November 2010, in Skara, he murdered his girlfriend Helle Christensen and ate parts of her body. He was subsequently committed to a mental health institution.

During his time at the institution, Drabbad has sparked several controversies that made headlines both in Sweden and internationally. In December 2011, he became engaged to Michelle Gustafsson, known in the media as the "Vampire Woman", who is also a murderer and an inmate at the same psychiatric hospital. Together, they mockingly blogged about their crimes from the hospital's computer, which led to a motion in the Swedish parliament to prohibit internet use for patients in Swedish psychiatric institutions.

In 2017, Drabbad made headlines again after selling voodoo dolls and other art containing blood and bodily fluids online from inside the hospital. He also posted several clips of himself on YouTube, filmed on the hospital grounds and during his furloughs. That same year, he garnered significant attention when it was reported that he had been involved with caregivers at Karsudden Regional Hospital in Katrineholm. Drabbad was denied furlough to marry one of the women, who subsequently resigned and was placed under a restraining order due to being considered a security risk. Drabbad continues to receive care in forensic psychiatric care, but since 2020, he has been registered at an address in Katrineholm.

== Background ==
Isakin Jonsson was born Jimmy Daniel Isaksson in 1978 in Köping, Sweden. He moved to Västerås at the age of two. He was in and out of institutions throughout his upbringing and has been convicted of drug offenses and theft several times in various locations in southern and central Sweden. When Jonsson committed the murder in 2010, he had a nine-year-old daughter. The daughter, Jamie-Lee, later wrote the book Skarakannibalens dotter ("The Skara Cannibal's Daughter") about her upbringing.

Jonsson met Helle Christensen in 2009 when they were both patients at a psychiatric clinic in Borås. They each had troubled pasts, with mental health issues and criminal convictions, and limited connections to the labour market. Christensen had five children, all of whom lived with their fathers. In the fall of 2010, Christensen and Jonsson moved from Borås to Skara. The three-bedroom apartment located at Valhallagatan 13 D in Skara was rented by Jonsson's mother. The apartment was sparsely furnished, and contact was made with social services in Skara regarding grants for home equipment. Jonsson and Christensen planned to live together in the future and possibly start a tattoo and piercing shop in the apartment.

Christensen's sister told the media that Jonsson had a violent temper and that she often had to pick up her sister after they argued. Christensen reportedly said that he never hurt her, even though she showed up with bruises and, on one occasion, broke her leg in three places. During the preliminary police investigation following the murder, the police discovered Christensen's diary, which painted a different picture of Jonsson. Written shortly before the murder, it described how scared Christensen was and that she did not dare to tell her loved ones. She wrote that Jonsson was a different person, noting "he talks about punishments, about all the evil". She also detailed his bad moods, personality changes, and aggressiveness, but added, "I can handle it because I love him".

Shortly before the murder, she contacted a woman at a local library near her home, asking for help finding a hostel where she could feel safe, but the librarian had to promise not to call the police. In his statement during the trial, public prosecutor Lars Johansson mentioned that Christensen had planned to start a new life in Skara, including opening a tattoo and piercing shop.

== Murder of Helle Christensen ==
Jonsson murdered Christensen in Skara on 12 November 2010. On the day of the murder, the couple got up at noon and dressed before going out shopping. Jonsson bought four beers and Jägermeister at Systembolaget, while Christensen purchased food at the local Ica store, Munken.

They were alone in the apartment until the murder, which occurred between 17:00 and 19:00. At one point, Christensen went to lie down on a mattress to rest or read. Jonsson then allegedly took a knife, cut the mattress, sat over Christensen's shoulders, and slit her throat. He then dampened the blood flow with a pillow. Christensen did not have time to resist, and death occurred rather immediately.

Jonsson then cut Christensen's pants, panties, shirt, and bra. He had an erection and penetrated Christensen but did not ejaculate. Using a knife, saw, and axe, Jonsson severed Christensen's head from her body. He also cut off pieces of flesh from one of her arms and legs, which he carried into the kitchen to cook. In a frying pan, he prepared the pieces of flesh with salt and homegrown cannabis leaves. Jonsson also took Christensen's head to the kitchen counter and processed it with an axe and knife, possibly with the intention of eating it.

After the murder, Jonsson called the police and confessed. In the emergency call, he said, "When you get here, you don't have to jump on me, I'm as calm as can be." Furthermore, he stated in the call, "I want to do the right thing for myself. What I have done now, I have no idea that I have actually done it, but I have woken up".

== Investigation ==
During the first police interrogation, Jonsson stated that he was most dangerous when he did not take his medication. He also mentioned that there was a bit of a fight on the day of the murder but could not explain what triggered his rage against his girlfriend. In the interrogation held the day after the murder, he tried to clarify, saying, "I can be perceived as unaffected, but when it happened yesterday I was in someone else's guise. Someone else acted in me."

When asked why he cut off his partner's head, dragged it into the kitchen, and placed it in the sink, Jonsson explained, "Why I have no idea. It felt like there were several people in the room. It's almost like a movie is playing."

Jonsson was arrested on 14 November 2010 during a hearing at Skövde police station, on probable grounds for suspicion of murder. The following day, the Skaraborg District Court decided that he would undergo a comprehensive examination conducted by a forensic psychiatrist. An analysis of the blood sample taken at the time of his arrest, carried out by the Swedish National Board of Forensic Medicine, showed that Jonsson had 1.35 per mille ethanol in his blood and 4.1 micrograms of tramadol per gram of blood. Tramadol is classified as a narcotic in Sweden.

During a search of the apartment, several items connected to the murder were found, including a frying pan from the kitchen and several horror movies on DVD. Among a large number of titles were films such as Green River Killer (2005) and The Wonderland Murders.

Large parts of the investigation were classified.

== Trial and verdict ==
On 11 March 2011, the trial against Jonsson began in Skaraborg District Court. By that time, Jonsson had already confessed to the murder, and the comprehensive forensic psychiatric examination he underwent indicated that he suffered from a serious mental disorder, including hallucinations. He was brought into the courtroom with his hands cuffed, accompanied by guards and his lawyer, Tore Brandtler. The hearing was held in the district court's special security room, Room 5, with a glass pane separating Jonsson from the audience and journalists.

Lawyer Tore Brandtler stated that Jonsson was psychotic when the police arrived at the apartment but was able to explain what had happened. He claimed that the substances in his body had been taken after the murder and that he had only consumed a few beers beforehand. Furthermore, Brandtler noted that there was no motive beyond Jonsson's serious mental disorder, asserting that voices had compelled him to commit the act. When the prosecutor reviewed the photos from the crime scene and the autopsy, the proceedings took place behind closed doors, and journalists and other audience members were asked to leave the courtroom. When the emergency call was played in court, Jonsson did not move a muscle.

Jonsson was convicted of murder and sentenced to forensic psychiatric care with a special discharge review at the Karsudden Regional Hospital in Katrineholm. He was also ordered to pay SEK 75,000 in damages to Christensen's parents and SEK 75,000 in damages to each of her five children.

== Time in psychiatric care ==
=== Initial hospital time ===
In the autumn of 2011, it was reported that Jonsson refused to take his medication for several months. This was evident from a medical report by Chief Physician Jan Golebiowski submitted to the Administrative Court in Linköping. The report also indicated that during his initial stay at the psychiatric hospital, Jonsson mostly kept to himself; however, he later began to move around the ward and socialize with other inmates. He engaged in strength training and was regularly allowed to go for walks around the hospital with caregivers.

=== New girlfriend ===
At Karsudden Regional Hospital, he met Michelle Gustafsson, known in the media as the Vampire Woman. Gustafsson was convicted of slitting the throat of 24-year-old father Daniel Stenman in Jakobsberg in 2010. Before the murder, she had written threatening posts on her blog about how she was going to cut the throats of people in the Stockholm Metro. She also posed for pictures like a vampire, with bloody lips, knives, and a chainsaw.

Jonsson and Gustafsson became a couple on 13 November 2011 after Jonsson asked in a chat on Windows Live Messenger "Will you be my girl?". They got engaged on 9 December. The relationship with Gustafsson, who, according to a judgment from the administrative court in March 2017, has non-institutional psychiatric care, ended in 2017.

=== Blogging, YouTube and art selling ===
On 23 February 2012, Borås Tidning reported that Jonsson and Gustafsson mockingly blogged about their committed crimes from a hospital computer. The newspaper also highlighted how offensive the victim's little sister found this behaviour. A chief medical officer can only decide to restrict internet use for an individual inmate under very specific circumstances, and the decision may apply for a maximum of two months at a time. A motion to prevent this (2016/17:855) was submitted to the Swedish parliament by Sweden Democrats Kent Ekeroth and Per Ramhorn in October 2016. On the blog, Jonsson answered questions from readers and expressed his indifference to what society thinks of him and his crime: "Most people say at some point in their life that they would never take someone else's life, but have you done it it's not a big deal anymore."

In April and May 2016, Jonsson published several video clips on YouTube in which he filmed himself speaking into the camera in broken English. He discussed how he is "fighting for survival" and stated that "the meaning of life is survival, nothing more. Because if you don't survive, you're dead. I'd rather have that philosophy because it means I never have to doubt what's right and what's wrong in life. As long as I know I'm fighting for my survival. I have been in such a mental state in my life because of drugs and so that I've been sure I've seen devils and angels and aliens and everything. But even then, when I look back at the most "fucked up trip" you can imagine, I gave up."

In one of the clips, he said, "I'm not a racist. Or I am a racist. I hate everyone, except a few people in the world. So I'm a racist against the human species, if you want to label me. I see me myself as anti-human. There's nothing about humans that I like. The only people in history who have any sense as I see it are the Vikings, the Spartans and people like that."

In another video recorded outside an Ica store, he spoke at length about his great interest in art, which he reportedly developed during his time in forensic psychiatric care.

In 2017, Katrineholms-Kuriren and Aftonbladet reported that Jonsson sold his own Voodoo dolls and macabre works of art directly from the hospital. The voodoo dolls were made from toilet paper, toothpicks, and sewing thread, with blood, hair, and semen from Jonsson himself used in the heads of the dolls. He also created masks that were displayed on various sites, along with several different works of art and paintings. Many of these pieces were made from his own blood and were signed in English with the phrase, "They call me Skara Cannibal."

=== Furloughs and name change ===
In 2015, it was reported that Jonsson had a four-hour furlough in Katrineholm each week.

In May 2016, it was reported that Jonsson had been granted a three-day furlough from the Karsudden Regional Hospital. He was partly going to help a relative move and partly to attend a summer wedding. The chief medical officer, who applied to the administrative court for Jonsson to receive more furloughs, stated in a submission that "the care has been unproblematic. He has had a stable mental status without relapse into drug abuse. All furloughs have gone without complications. The goal is that he will gradually receive increased furloughs to his apartment and when the period involves several overnight stays, during the furlough he will have contact with a non-institutional psychiatric care clinic."

During his time in care, Jonsson had been provided with his own apartment, where he had previously been granted furloughs. He was now set to receive additional freedoms through a three-day furlough in June. However, the administrative court denied the chief medical officer's request for Jonsson to be granted two additional days of furlough. The prosecutor opposed Jonsson's extended freedom outside the hospital, stating that "In light of the risk of recidivism in very serious crime, there is no reason to grant additional furloughs. Even the plaintiffs for the crime that Isakin Jonsson committed have partially opposed more furloughs."

In June 2016, Jonsson was granted a three-day furlough, during which he helped a relative move and attended a wedding, but he was denied two additional days of furlough at the same time.

In the fall of 2016, Jonsson changed his surname to Drabbad (which means 'hit, struck, affected' in Swedish). This name change was prompted by significant anger directed at the administrator at the National Swedish Patent and Registration Office (PRV). In a handwritten letter dated October 2016, Jonsson began with, "Hey you fucking idiot." He expressed that his primary wish was to change his surname to Isaksson. A few days before he wrote the letter, PRV had decided that this request could not be approved based on an order.

Isakin wrote, "I have paid money for you to do your job. I, Isakin Jonsson, want to change my surname from Jonsson to the newly formed surname Drabbad," emphasizing the latter in capital letters. He continued, "Make sure and do your damn job because I won't give in and let this go until I get my way. You're messing with the wrong guy."

The name change was ultimately approved, but the angry letter influenced a situation in early 2017 when Drabbad's doctor applied for a three-day furlough for him along with a relative. The prosecutor objected to the application, stating in a submission to the administrative court that "In connection with an examination at the National Swedish Patent and Registration Office, he has acted very inappropriately and threateningly towards an administrator". The prosecutor further noted that Drabbad "still exhibits an aggressive and abnormal behavior when someone goes against him."

Both the administrative court and the Administrative Court of Appeal in Jönköping rejected Drabbad's furlough application. The chief medical officer at the Karsudden Regional Hospital near Katrineholm had considered him to have completed treatment, stating that he no longer had a psychotic diagnosis and was in the process of being discharged. However, in the administrative court, the chief doctor was supported by an expert who testified that Drabbad had been treated and had already received many "exempt benefits." This expert also believed that the risk of recidivism for serious crime was low and that the prosecutor placed "too much emphasis on historical matters". However, both courts ultimately rejected the furlough application.

In the spring of 2017, a decision was made for Drabbad to continue receiving care, and he was denied non-institutional psychiatric treatment. Drabbad believed he had completed his medical treatment and wanted it to end. His request was first rejected by the administrative court and then, in April 2017, by the administrative court of appeals. According to both the chief medical officer and the prosecutor, Drabbad still suffered from a mental disorder, and there was a risk he might relapse into criminal behaviour.

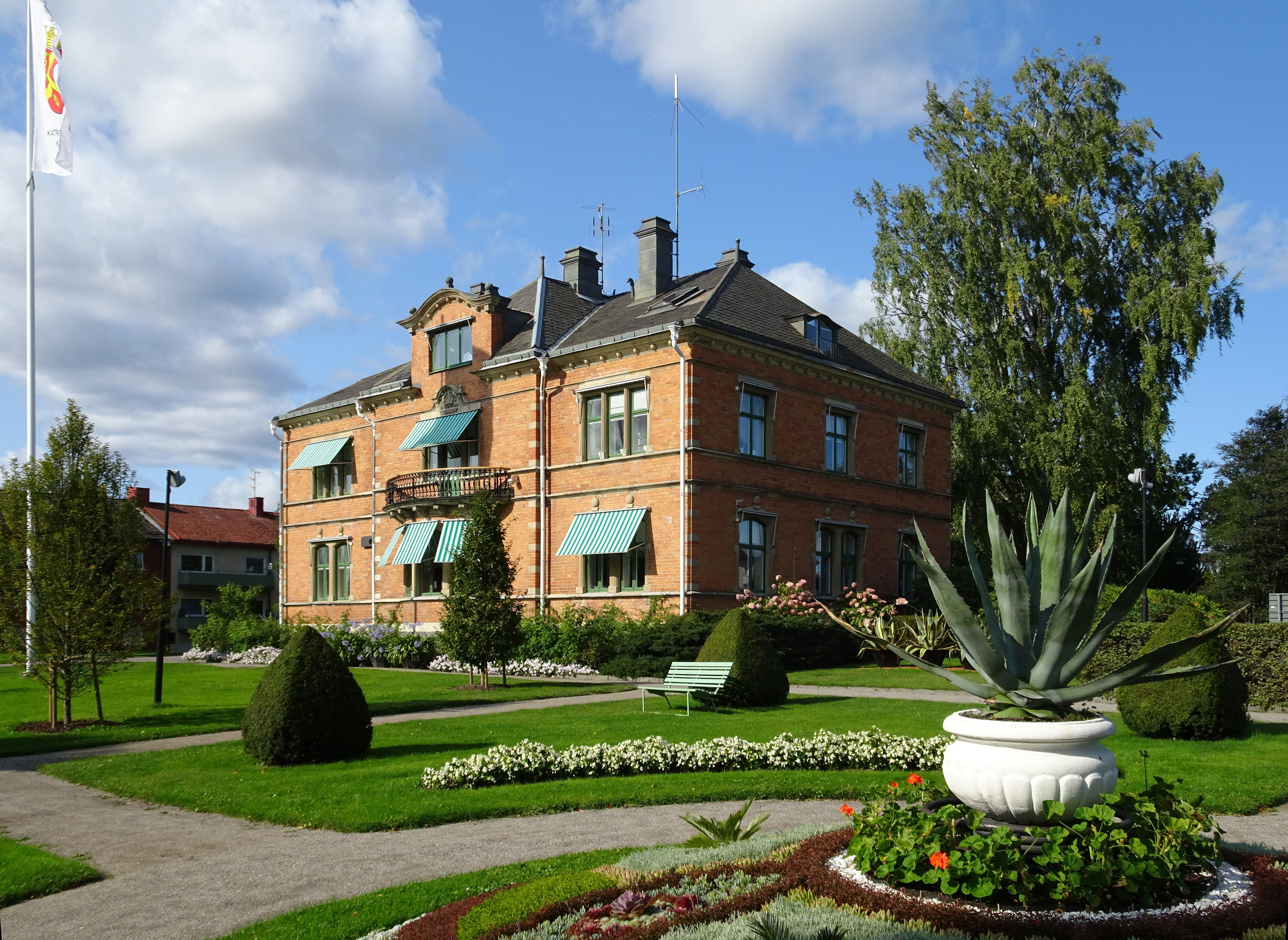
Katrineholm City Hall where Drabbad wanted to marry his former caretaker

In the summer of 2017, Drabbad applied for a supervised furlough to the Katrineholm City Hall in order to marry his new girlfriend. In the decision made by the Administrative Court in Linköping, it was stipulated that, apart from himself, hospital staff, two witnesses, and the girlfriend would be present. The girlfriend had worked as a carer at the Karsudden Regional Hospital, and the hospital management became aware of their relationship after receiving repeated reports that her connection with Drabbad was more intense and closer than what constituted a professional relationship.

After the hospital management began to suspect the relationship, the woman chose to resign and was subsequently classified as a "security risk." In mid-July 2017, she was called to a meeting with management, during which she claimed that her relationship with Drabbad was purely professional. However, a few days later, she decided to terminate her employment. Following her resignation, she and Drabbad maintained close telephone contact, and she expressed a desire to visit him. According to the judgment, another meeting was held with her, during which she acknowledged having a friendly relationship with Drabbad but did not confirm any romantic involvement. Nonetheless, she did state that she could potentially serve as a future furlough destination address for him.

The Södermanland County Council chose to impose visiting restrictions on the woman. Had she not voluntarily decided to end her employment, she would have been suspended from work during the ongoing investigation. According to the hospital management, she posed a security risk if allowed to meet Drabbad.

In its judgment, the administrative court deemed the restrictions justified due to "her knowledge of the hospital's routines and the risk that she participates in the introduction of unauthorized objects or in another way can conceivably assist the patient in the event of a release or escape." The fact that she possessed confidential information about other patients also influenced the county council's decision, which she subsequently chose to appeal.

In her appeal, she disclosed that her relationship with Drabbad was more than just friendship, stating that he was her boyfriend/fiancé and that she had not received any explanation for his refusal to allow her to visit him. The Administrative Court of Linköping opted to uphold the county council's position, and the visiting restrictions remained in place.

In addition, the court rejected Drabbad's request to go to Katrineholm to get married. In its decision, the administrative court noted that the chief medical officer had rejected the application, stating, among other things, the following: The application concerned an accompanied trip and was therefore not interpreted as a request to be examined by the administrative court. The Karsudden Regional Hospital did not object to Drabbad's desire to marry; however, the activity was not considered a care activity, and personnel resources were not allocated for that purpose. The woman Drabbad intended to marry, according to the administrative court's decision, "has recently received a decision to restrict access to Isakin Drabbad."

In October 2017, a document was submitted to the Administrative Court of Linköping. In it, Drabbad's doctor stated that the girlfriend had not been allowed to visit him since July 2017, which, according to the doctor, he reacted to strongly. In his notes, the chief doctor indicated that this situation had led to "further frustration for the patient." Drabbad's furloughs to his own apartment had previously ended, and in connection with that, he allegedly used illegal substances and interrupted a drug treatment program. The doctor noted that "the patient today denies these drug-related activities and does not participate in constructive conversations in the spirit of relapse prevention." The risk that Drabbad would relapse into using illegal substances was deemed to have increased, which "would increase the risk of aggressive impulse breakthroughs." Furthermore, the doctor wrote in his notes that "due to the circumstances described above, release or furloughs are deemed not to be appropriate at the moment."

== Release ==
In 2020, Drabbad was transferred to outpatient care and given an apartment in Katrineholm in August the same year. In March 2024, he moved to another apartment.

== Media ==
Drabbad is featured in the episode "My Father the Cannibal" in the American TV series Evil Lives Here: The Killer Speaks (2025) on Investigation Discovery. In 2026, his daughter, Jamie Lee Arrow, discussed her experience of him as a father in an interview with LADBible, describing the psychological manipulation he put her through growing up.

== See also ==
- List of incidents of cannibalism
