= Jónsdóttir =

Jónsdóttir is a surname of Icelandic origin, meaning daughter of Jón. In Icelandic names, the name is not strictly a surname, but a patronymic (see Icelandic name).

Notable people with the name include:

- Ágústína Jónsdóttir (b. 1949), Icelandic writer, artist and educator
- Anna G. Jónasdóttir (b. 1942), Icelandic political scientist and academic
- Arna Lára Jónsdóttir (b. 1976), Icelandic politician
- Áslaug Jónsdóttir (b. 1963), Icelandic children's writer
- Auður Jónsdóttir (b. 1973), Icelandic author and freelance journalist
- Birgitta Jónsdóttir a member of parliament in Iceland and a former volunteer with WikiLeaks
- Gunnfríður Jónsdóttir (1889–1968), Icelandic sculptor
- Íeda Jónasdóttir Herman, Icelandic author and adventurer
- Jóhanna Guðrún Jónsdóttir, Icelandic singer
- Jóhanna Vala Jónsdóttir (b. 1986), Icelandic beauty queen; 2007 Miss Iceland
- Laufey Lín Jónsdóttir (b. 1999), Icelandic singer-songwriter
- Ragnheiður Jónsdóttir (1646–1715), Icelandic woman whose face is on the 5000 kronur note
- Ragnhildur Steinunn Jónsdóttir (b. 1981), Icelandic television personality; former Miss Iceland
- Sveindís Jane Jónsdóttir (b. 2001), Icelandic footballer
- Þórunn Helga Jónsdóttir (born 1984), Icelandic footballer
