= Magnús Jónsson (disambiguation) =

Magnús Jónsson (or Magnús prúði, 1530–1591), Icelandic official and poet.

Magnus Jonsson or Magnús Jónsson may also refer to:

- Magnús Jónsson (actor) (born 1965), Icelandic actor, in The Viking Sagas
- Magnus Jonsson (biathlete) (born 1982), Swedish biathlete
- Magnús Jónsson, Earl of Orkney c. 1300–1321
- Magnús Jónsson (law professor), Icelandic law professor and minister of finance (1922–1923)
- Magnús Jónsson (Minister for Employment), Icelandic politician and Minister for Employment (1942)
- Magnús Jónsson (Minister of Finance), Icelandic politician and minister of finance (1965–1971)
- Megas (Magnús Þór Jónsson, born 1945), Icelandic rock and roll singer and songwriter
