= Kverneland (surname) =

Kverneland is a surname used in Norway. Notable people with the surname are as follows:

- Kristin Kverneland Lønningdal (1923–2010), Norwegian politician
- Ole Gabriel Kverneland (1854–1941), Norwegian businessman
- Steffen Kverneland (born 1963), Norwegian illustrator and comics writer
