= Oscar Jonsson =

Oscar Jonsson may refer to:

- Oscar Jonsson (bandy) (born 1977), Swedish bandy player
- Oscar Jonsson (footballer) (born 1997), Swedish footballer
