= Hjálmar Jónsson (priest) =

Icelandic politician

Hjálmar Jónsson (born 17 April 1950) is a clergyman of the Evangelical Lutheran Church of Iceland. He is currently the pastor of the parish of Reykjavík Cathedral. He was a member of the Alþingi (Parliament of Iceland) 1995–2001.
