= Skiöld =

Skiöld is a Swedish surname that refer to

- Birgit Skiöld (1923–1982), Swedish printmaker and modernist artist
- Lars-Erik Skiöld (1952–2017), Swedish wrestler
- Leif Skiöld (1935–2014), Swedish football and ice hockey player
- Ossian Skiöld (1889–1961), Swedish hammer thrower

== See also ==
- Skjöldr
