= Näsnaren =

Lake in Katrineholm Municipality, Sweden

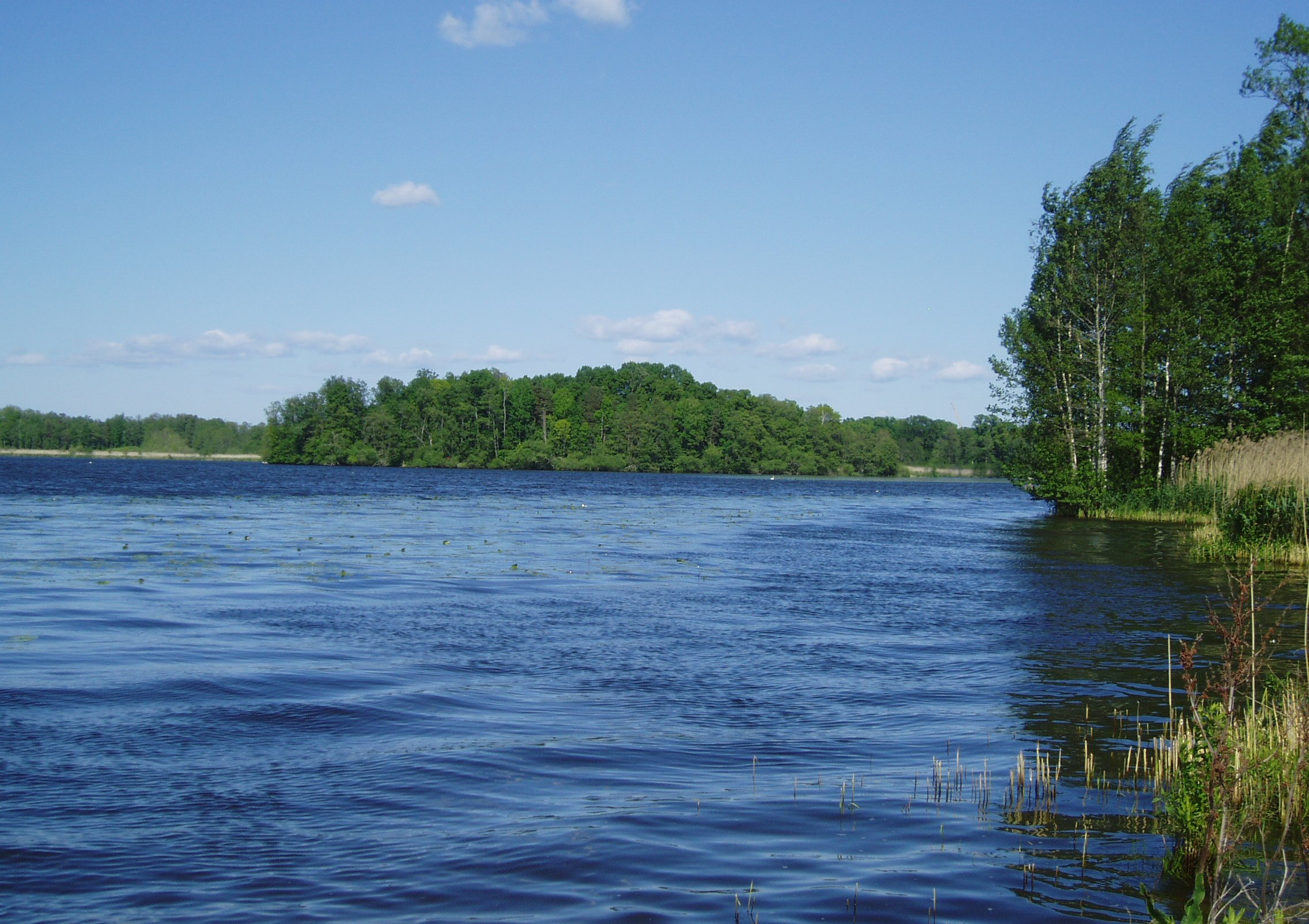

- Location within Södermanland
- Coordinates: 59.0166667°N 16.1666667°E
- Basin countries: Sweden

Näsnaren is a lake in Södermanland, Sweden. It is close to the city of Katrineholm, southwest of Stockholm.
