= Brandbergen =

Area in Southern Stockholm, Sweden

Coordinates: 59°10′20″N 18°10′15″E

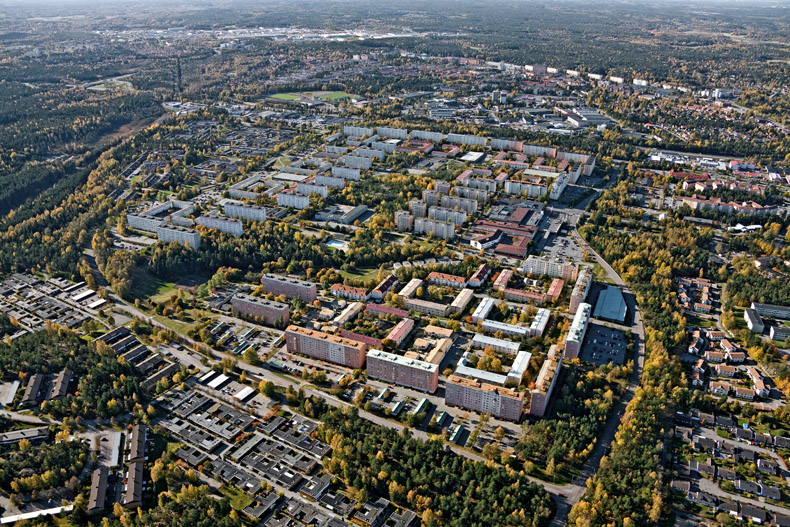
Overhead view of Brandbergen. October, 2010

Brandbergen is a suburb in Haninge Municipality, Stockholm County, Sweden. It is a residential area located about 18 km (11 mi) south of Stockholm. As of September 2017, the population is estimated to be around 10,000.

Most of the buildings are dense apartment blocks that were built during the 1960s and 1970s. Some of the nearby amenities include supermarkets, restaurants, a post office, a shopping center, and Tyresta National Park. The commute to central Stockholm is generally facilitated via bus and commuter rail services, with options for walking, biking, and driving.
