= Jöns =

Jöns is a Swedish given name and a surname.

Notable people with the given name include:

- Jöns Jacob Berzelius (1779–1848), Swedish chemist
- Jöns Budde (1435–1495), Franciscan friar from the Brigittine monastery in NaantaliVallis Gratiae - near Turku, Finland
- Jöns Gerekesson (died 1433), controversial Archbishop of Uppsala, Sweden 1408–1421, and Iceland 1426–1433 until he was drowned
- Jöns Peter Hemberg (1763–1834), Swedish banker and member of parliament
- Jöns Bengtsson Oxenstierna (1417–1467), Swedish archbishop of Uppsala (1448–1467) and regent of Sweden
- Jöns Svanberg (1771–1851), Swedish clergyman and natural scientist

Notable people with the surname include:

- Christer Jöns (born 1987), German racing driver
- Karin Jöns (born 1953), German politician and Member of the European Parliament with the Social Democratic Party of Germany

== See also ==
- Jönssi
- Jönsson
