= Peter Jonsson =

Peter Jonsson can refer to:

- Peter Jönsson (born 1965), Swedish footballer
- Peter Jonsson (cyclist) (born 1958), Swedish cyclist
- Peter Jonsson (politician) (born 1962), Swedish politician, member of the Riksdag since 2002
