= List of disasters in Sweden by death toll =

This is a list of disasters and in modern Sweden sorted by death toll.

== 100 or more ==
Disaster	Location	Deaths	Date	Notes
Pandemic	Sweden-wide	225,000–500,000	1350	The first wave of the Black Death in Sweden killed 30-40% to two-thirds of the then Swedish population.
Famine	Sweden-wide	100,000	1770s	Famine due to crop failure.
Pandemic	Sweden-wide	37,573 (probably more)	1918–1920	In Sweden, 37,573 people died from the Spanish flu pandemic according to official statistics.
Pandemic	Sweden-wide	37,000	1834–1874	Between 1834 and 1874, 37,000 people died in Sweden of cholera.
Pandemic	Sweden-wide	23,563	2020, January 24 – present	The COVID-19 pandemic is reported to have killed 23,563 people in Sweden as of February 11, 2023.
Famine	Sweden-wide	10,000	1867–1869	During the famine of 1867–69 which hit Finland and northern Sweden, poor harvests and uneven distribution of food led to the poor population, mainly in the North, dying in thousands.
Snowstorm	Öjfjället	3,000+	1718	During a disastrous retreat from Tydalsfjällen by a Swedish Carolean army around New Year 1719, about 3,000 men froze to death.
Massacre	Ronneby	2,000	1564, September 4	Up to 2,000 people (men, women and children) were killed in the Ronneby Bloodbath when Swedish troops entered Ronneby and executed people after a couple of Swedish soldiers had been assaulted and hanged there for a time before.
Sea battle	near Öland	810	1676, June 1	The warship Kronan was sunk during the battle of Öland. The sinking was caused by the ship capsizing in a too sharp turn. During the capsizing, the gunpowder storeroom ignited and the main part of the bow was blown away on the starboard side.
Sea battle	near Öland	700	1676, June 1	The warship Svärdet was sunk during the battle of Öland after being ignited by a Dutch fire ship.
Sea battle	near Öland	500	1564, May 31	The warship Mars was sunk during the first battle of Öland after gunpowder storeroom was ignited. A total of 800 men, of which 300 were enemy crews, died in the ensuing explosion.
Execution	Stockholm	circa 100	1520, November 8–9	During Stockholm Bloodbath, approximately 100 Swedes were executed in Stortorget, Gamla stan in conjunction with Christian II's coronation as Swedish king.
Snowstorm	Götaland and Svealand	>100	1850, January 29	Sudden and very intense snowstorms caused roughly a hundred deaths, mainly in northeastern Götaland and Svealand. The incident is called The Blizzard Tuesday Yrväderstisdagen.

== 50 to 99 deaths ==
Disaster	Location	Deaths	Date	Notes
Shipwreck	Baltic Sea	84	1944, November 24	Hansa was hit by a Russian torpedo and sank about 44 kilometers north of Visby. Of the 86 people on board, 84 perished.
Murder	Käpplingen	70	1392, June 17	Seventy Swedes were incarcerated in a barn after which the building was set on fire.
Fire	Gothenburg	63	1998, October 30	In the Gothenburg discothèque fire, 63 people died and about 214 were injured.

== 10 to 49 deaths ==
Disaster	Location	Deaths	Date	Notes
Shipwreck	Armasjärvi	46	1940, October 24	The accident occurred on Lake Armasjärvi when a ferry sank and 46 men were killed.
Fire	Tidaholm	44–46	1875, February 25	Vulcan Match Plant in Tidaholm catches fire where 44 or 46 people are reported to have been killed; almost all girls between 18 and 20 years.
Shipwreck	Kattegat	33	1943, April 16	The submarine HSwMS Ulven, during a training mission, hit a German naval mine off Gothenburg and 33 men were killed.
Explosion	Hårsfjärden	33	1941, September 17	A powerful explosion occurred in Hårsfjärden where the destroyer Klas Uggla, Klas Horn and Göteborg were destroyed.
Air disaster	Ängelholm	31	1964, November 20	Linjeflyg Flight 277 crashed during approach to Ängelholm Airport. 31 people died.
Shipwreck	Beckholmen	30	1628, August 10	The warship Vasa sank on her maiden voyage after capsizing. The water began to gush in through the open gun hatches and the ship sank. At least 30 men were killed, but perhaps as many as 50.
Murder	Malmö	27	1978–79	An 18-year-old worker poisoned the elderly in Malmö Östra Hospital with corrosive cleaning agents Gevisol and Ivisol. 27 patients were affected in what has been known as Malmö Östra hospital murders.
Shipwreck	Lilla Bommen	26	1908, April 15	The steamship Göta Elf capsized almost immediately after leaving the dock. 26 people died.
Shipwreck	Stora Hammarsundet	25	1828, April 28	A heavily laden ferry departed on his way home from the traditional spring market in Askersund. When the ferry reached halfway a line burst and an ox fell into the water. Several people hurried to try to pull up the animal. Oblique load meant that the ferry capsized and sank. 25 people drowned.
Shipwreck	Vättern	24	1918, November 19–20	The passenger ship Per Brahe sank in a storm on Lake Vättern outside Hästholmen, probably caused by the cargo had shifted. All on board were killed, including artist John Bauer and his family.
Air disaster	Kälvesta	22	1977, January 15	Linjeflyg Flight 618 crashed in a parking lot at Ängsullsvägen in Kälvesta in western Stockholm during an approach to Bromma Airport. 22 people were killed, including table tennis world champion Hans Alsér.
Fire	Börstil Parish	22	1882, May 31	A fire in Börstil poorhouse on the night of 31 May 1882 in Börstil Parish outside Östhammar after being struck by lightning and the building was ignited. 22 people died.
Shipwreck	Kattegatt	21	1935, November 2	The steamship Gerd collided with the Åland barque Lingard, the entire crew of the Gerd perished.
Fire	Borås	20	1978, June 10	The city hotel catches fire during a graduation party. 20 people died in the fire and some 50 were injured.
Explosion	Vaxholm	19	1887, August 11	In connection with gunpowder handling at Vaxholm Fortress, a large explosion occurred which killed 19 gunners, 16 from Svea Artillery Regiment and three from Göta Artillery Regiment.
Shipwreck	Eggegrund	17	1954, January 19	The steamship Nedjan av Simrishamn was lost on 19 January 1954 in the Eggegrund area, where 17 people perished.
Air disaster	Oskarshamn	16	1989, May 8	16 people, including several members of parliament, were killed when a domestic flight crashed shortly before landing.
Shipwreck	Varpen	15	22 August 1896	The steamboat Ydale sank on Lake Varpen in Bollnäs Municipality. 13 children and two adults drowned.
Shipwreck	Baltic Sea	15	17 December 1956	Höken of Gothenburg disappeared, possibly after hitting a naval mine, while traveling from Klaipėda, Lithuania to Gävle. The ship had 15 crew.
Shipwreck	Baltic Sea	14	29 October 1944	The steamboat Bengt Sture was sunk by the Soviet submarine SC 406. 14 Swedes and one Norwegian disappeared. The submarine picked up seven Swedish crewmen. According to a Russian historian, they were shot by the NKVD security police in a prison camp, something that has not been officially confirmed by the Russians.
Shipwreck	Dorotea Municipality	14	12 May 1936	In connection with log driving, an overloaded boat capsized into the cold water and 14 people drowned.
Explosion	Palovaara	14	3 July 1944	Fourteen servicemen were killed when tank mines exploded at Palovaara, just west of Haparanda.
Air disaster	Hållö	13	22 October 1943	13 people were killed when Swedish AB Aerotransport's DC3 "Gripen" was shot down by German fighters at Hållö outside the coast of Bohuslän.
Tram accident	Gothenburg	13	12 March 1992	A powerless tram rolled backwards down Aschebergsgatan in Gothenburg without being able to brake. It derailed at Vasaplatsen and hit the waiting people at a stop. 13 people died and 29 were injured.
Fire	Svärdsjö	12	29 February 1932	Twelve elderly people were killed in a fire at a retirement home in Svärdsjö.
Shipwreck	Bössviken	11	23 July 1896	The boat Freja af Fryken sank in at Bössviken, Östra Ämtervik. Eleven people drowned.
Shipwreck	Böttö	11	29 August 1950	The tugboat Barbara rolled over and sank in bad weather at Böttö in the Archipelago of Gothenburg. 11 people were killed.
Fire	Rödebyholm	11	27 March 1944	Rödebyholm orphanage was destroyed by fire and eleven children aged three to eight years died.
Explosion	Björkborn	11	17 December 1940	An explosion occurred at AB Bofors Nobelkrut in Björkborn, Karlskoga Municipality after a fire started in the TNT casting foundry. 11 people were killed and around 100 buildings were completely destroyed and as many were damaged in an area of about 15 hectares.
Air disaster	Karlstad	10	23 September 1950	Svenska Aero's plane on its way to Stockholm had just taken off from Karlstad Airport when it reared up and fell to the ground. All ten on board were killed.
Air disaster	Huvudskär	10	6 September 1968	A Hkp 4 crashed at Huvudskär in the Stockholm archipelago when a rotor blade snapped. Ten people were killed.
Murder	Skåne	9+1	29 April 1939	The police officer Tore Hedin killed a man in the village of Tjörnarp. A year later, during a nighttime murder tour he killed another nine people before drowning himself in Lake Bosarpa.
Shipwreck	Vållö	10	29 April 1939	10 men from the torpedo cruiser Jacob Bagge drowned at Vållö when an overcrowded boat capsized.
Shipwreck	off Bergkvara	10	26 July 1925	Off Bergkvara in southern Kalmarsund, a group of ten young people aged 14–21 years drowned during a sailing trip from Garpen lighthouse to Bergkvara harbor. The boat was surprised by a gust and was overturned, with all ten ended up in the water and drowned.
Explosion	Baltic Sea	10	17 July 1940	During an exercise west of Gotland, one of the boilers in fire room number four exploded on the coastal defence ship HSwMS Gustav V. Eight men were killed immediately, and the two men on the deck and passed the boiler's air intake were severely injured. These were taken by a minesweeper to Visby Hospital, where they later died.
Explosion	Ränneslätt	10	6 March 1943	An accident occurred during an exercise with explosives at Ränneslätt. 31 men were injured and ten died of the explosion.
Explosion	Gräsgård	10	22 November 1941	Ten men were killed on Hjvb 282 Libanon when a naval mine exploded outside Gräsgård in Öland. A defused mine was lifted on board one of the boats, but had not noticed that a second mine was hanging on.
Explosion	Västervik	10	6 May 1918	Ten men were killed in a naval mine blast at the glass factory in Västervik after a fisherman found the mine floating in the water 400–500 meters outside Cape Gränsö and brought it to shore.

== Significant incidents resulting in fewer than 10 deaths ==
Disaster	Location	Deaths	Date	Notes
Air disaster	Umeå	9	14 July 2019	9 people were killed in the Skydive Umeå Gippsland GA8 Airvan crash.
Explosion	Järflotta	9	18 August 1948	An accident occurred at the second artillery piece in which nine people died. It was at a technical shooting when the pendulum pressure arose, probably due to great of a charge that blew up the mechanism and the artillery piece's rear parts.
Explosion	off Lysekil	8	12 October 1944	Eight men were killed when the patrol boat Hjvb 256 Condor hit a naval mine off Lysekil.
Shipwreck	Lower Vättern	8	28 August 1961	In conjunction with a major fishing competition on Lake Lower Vättern in Skinnskatteberg, a small boat capsized in heavy weather and eight people drowned.
Explosion	Gyttorp	8	29 October 1964	Eight men died and 21 have to be taken to hospital after a double explosion in the explosives factory Nitroglycerin AB.
Air disaster	Lunde	8	9 December 1999	Eight people were killed when a two-engine Piper PA-31 Navajo propeller plane crashed shortly after 12:00 after take-off from Midlanda Airport.
Shipwreck	Hävringe	7	24 March 1944	The patrol boat Hjvb 232 Isbjörn capsized and sank in a storm on the road to Hävringe lighthouse. The pilot boat from Hävringe went out to the site and was able to save three of the ten occupants.
Murder	Falun	7	11 June 1994	Mattias Flink shot and killed five women and two men in Falun.
Fire	Rinkeby	7	25 July 2009	Shortly after 10.00 pm on 25 July 2009, a fire destroyed an apartment on the ground floor of Kuddbygränd in Rinkeby. A mother and her five daughters were killed immediately. Later a relative of the family died in the hospital. The fire had started in a lamp.
Fire	Stockholm	7	March 1975	Seven patients were killed and 15 injured in a fire at S:t Eriks Hospital in Stockholm.
Lightning	Hamneda	7	1 July 1895	The lightning struck in a barn and killed seven people.
Explosion	Grundfors	7	14 March 1956	During work in an open lowering channel, an explosion occurred at the building of Grundfors Power Station, killing seven people and injuring three.
Fire	Eksjö	6	February 1954	Six people died in a fire at a retirement home in Eksjö.
Explosion	Karlberg Palace	6	29 July 1942	The Reserve Officer Course practiced mine-laying and demining at Karlberg Palace when some mines were triggered. Six cadets from Bohuslän Regiment died.
Explosion	Grängesberg	6	27 May 1926	At AB Expressdynamit's facilities in Grängesberg a building exploded and the six people inside, six workers, were killed. The accident was considered to be caused by a metal that accidentally came with the pressing of a dynamite mass of 160 kg, wherein by the heat of friction generated, the dynamite was ignited.
Explosion	Gothenburg	6	3 April 1943	During work on a naval mine in a shed building within the mine workshop at Nya Varvet in Gothenburg, six men were killed.
Explosion	Gothenburg archipelago	6	13 December 1939	Six men were killed aboard the coastal defence ship HSwMS Manligheten in the Gothenburg archipelago during the salvage of a German paravane. Another 14 men received varying injuries.
Gas leak	Borlänge	5	6 April 1953	Five men in the hot blast cabin at Domnarvet Iron Works were killed when toxic gas leaked in after a leak in a water trap.
Terrorism	Stockholm	5	7 April 2017	2017 Stockholm truck attack. An Uzbek asylum seeker hijacked a truck and deliberately drove it into crowds of people in central Stockholm killing 5 and seriously wounding 14.
Explosion	Perstorp	5	29 May 1954	Five people were killed when a two-story building belonging to Skånska vinegar factory in Perstorp exploded. In the building there were machines for grinding down wood for use in plastic pulp.
Explosion	Luleå	5	3 March 1940	Five people (including two children) died in an arson attack when an explosive charge placed in the printing press of the communist newspaper Norrskensflamman exploded.
Explosion	Heleneborg	5	3 September 1864	Five people died when the Nobel family's factory for the production of nitroglycerin exploded, including Alfred Nobel's brother Emil Oskar Nobel. The accident was a major incentive for Alfred Nobel's development of explosive dynamite.
Murder	Mälaren	5	17 May 1900	The 25-year-old John Filip Nordlund robbed and murdered five people on the steamer Prins Carl.
Murder	Stockholm, Uppsala	5	7 March 1932	In the Von Sydow murders, the 23-year-old law student Fredrik von Sydow kills his father Hjalmar von Sydow in Norr Mälarstrand in Stockholm and two of his father's maidservants. Later that evening in Uppsala, he shoot his young wife and then himself.
Fire	Sundsvall	5	25 October 1982	Five people are killed in a fire at Sundsvall nursing home.
Fire	Sundsvall	5	25 June 1888	Five people are killed and 9,000 become homeless when the city of Sundsvall burns down.
Fire	Malmköping	5	June 1971	Five people are killed in a fire in a rehabilitation ward in Malmköping.
Fire	Staffanstorp	5	2 September 2009	Four children and a 27-year-old woman died in a house fire in Staffanstorp. According to the Swedish National Forensics Centre, the fire was probably caused by an overheated battery in a laptop lying on a sofa.
Murder	Uppsala	5	8 April 1966	A theologian in Uppsala murdered his wife and four children with an ax.
Murder	Hörja	4	31 March 1900	Teacher Frans Oscar Bergstrand poisoned four of his children and then took his own life.
Murder	Östersund	4	21 January 1954	50-year-old taxi owner Valdemar Näslund murdered his wife and three children with an ax in his apartment in Östersund. The motive was that he embezzled money from a taxi owner's cash register.
Murder	Stockholm	4	4 December 1994	Tommy Zethraeus shot dead four and injured six people outside the entrance to the nightclub Sturecompagniet in Stockholm after having been in disarray with the nightclub bouncers earlier in the evening.
Murder	Söderhamn	4	1 March 1971	The 61-year-old Gunnar Bengtsson shot four people dead during a preparatory hearing in a dispute in Söderhamn Courthouse in Söderhamn.
Murder	Östra Broby	4	12 January 1886	Nils Peter Hagström murdered during the night between 11 and 12 January 1886 four people at Gliminge Gård in Östra Broby.
Murder	Brandbergen	4	8 September 1980	A 22-year-old kills three men and a woman in an apartment on Jungfruns gata in Brandbergen, Stockholm.
Murder	Bällsta	4	4 November 1945	Repairman John Lundvall from Bällsta murdered his wife and three children with an ax.
Fire	Stockholm	4	15 March 1977	Four people were killed in a fire at the restaurant and nightclub Monte Carlo on Sveavägen in Stockholm. Around 200 people were in the room.
Explosion	Västgöta Wing	4	30 May 1940	Five men were killed when a weapons storage room, which adjoined a hangar at Västgöta Wing (F 6) in Karlsborg, exploded.
Explosion	Stockholm archipelago	4	29 May 1949	Four men were killed in an explosion in a battery room on the coastal submarine HSwMS U4 in Solofjärden at Oskar-Fredriksborg fortress.
Shipwreck	Hunnebostrand	3	March 1945	The patrol boat Hjvb 383 Ocean was towing two German motor boats outside Hunnebostrand. A hawser broke and three men drowned when a motor boats drifted onto a skerry.
Murder	Handen	3	9 January 1967	28-year-old Leif Peters shot dead two police officers and a security guard in Handen, Stockholm.
Murder	Vattnäs	3	24 December 1975	The non-commissioned officer Sten Fransson shot dead his fiancée and her parents and injured the fiancée's daughter with his service pistol.
Murder	Åmsele	3	3 July 1988	Juha Valjakkala shot a man, his son and later also his wife at the cemetery in Åmsele after being caught having stolen their bicycle.
Murder	Härnösand	3	11 May 2010	A 49-year-old man and his two children, a 15-year-old boy and a 12-year-old girl were murdered in their home by 21-year-old Ragnar Nilsson who was half-brother with the two children.
Murder	Sorunda	3	2 January 1956	Count Gustaf-Fredrik von Rosen shot his wife and two children and then shot himself.
Murder	Gothenburg	3	29 Jan-1 Feb 2001	Roger Karlsson murdered three close people within a few days.
Explosion	Off Nynäshamn	3	28 October 1948	An explosion on the cruiser HSwMS Gotland killed three men and ten were injured.
Explosion	Moheda	3	23 July 1958	At the Army's distribution center for fuel an explosion occurred that claimed three people's lives of a total of eleven people who worked at the facility.
Explosion	Björkborn	3	29 April 1941	A gas explosion occurred in one of the buildings of the new TNT factory in Björkborn. Three workers were killed.
Fire	off Lysekil	3	7 April 1990	159 people are killed, including three Swedes in a fire on the ferry MS Scandinavian Star, on its way from Oslo to Frederikshavn.
Fire	Gothenburg	3	9 August 1931	Three firefighters were killed in a major fire at Hanssons Pyrotechnics (Hanssons Pyrotekniska).
Explosion	Basareholmen	2	1949	A blasting accident during the mixing of a primer occurred where two people died.
Shipwreck	Vindö	2	13 June 2004	Close to Sollenkroka on Vindö, after completion of an exercise and on the way to the base at Vaxholm Amphibian Regiment (Amf 1) at Rindö, a CB90-class fast assault craft ran into another assault craft and two servicemen were killed.

== Significant incidents of Swedes being killed overseas ==
Excludes deaths attributable to war.

Disaster	Location	Deaths	Date	Notes
Tsunami	Thailand	543	26 December 2004	The 2004 Indian Ocean earthquake and tsunami caused the deaths of 227,898 people, 543 of whom were Swedish.
Shipwreck	Baltic Sea	501	28 September 1994	The sinking of the MS Estonia in bad weather during its journey from Tallinn to Stockholm with 989 people on board resulted in the death of 852 people. Of 552 Swedes on board, 501 died.
Shipwreck	West Indies	117	30 April 1846	The corvette Carlskrona lost in the West Indies and 117 people were killed.
Shipwreck	Atlantic Ocean	89	15 April 1912	RMS Titanic steamed on her maiden voyage from Southampton, England towards New York City, United States and hit an iceberg and damaged its hull. She sankt within three hours. 1,517 people died. 123 Swedes were on board – 89 of them died.
Air disaster	Madrid–Barajas Airport, Spain	22	27 November 1983	Early on the morning of Sunday, 27 November 1983, Avianca Flight 011 crashed on approach to Madrid–Barajas Airport. On board were 192 people. 11 people survived the crash. Among those killed were 27 Scandinavians, thereof 22 Swedes. Most Scandinavian citizens were young people on their way to South America to bring home adopted children.
Shipwreck	North Sea	22	2 February 1953	During the North Sea flood of 1953, Aspö of Stockholm was reported missing on 2 February after getting the deck load flushed overboard and a leaking in the front of the ship. Aspö disappeared without a trace with 22 crew.
Air disaster	west of Salerno, Italy	21	18 November 1947	A transport aircraft of the type Bristol 170 Freighter had been chartered by the Swedish Air Force to carry home 21 flight officers and flight engineers, who had supplied bombers sold to the Ethiopian government. On a stage from Catania to Rome, the plane came for unknown reason off course and crashed against Monte Carro. On board were 21 passengers in addition to the three members of the crew. The accident killed 21 people, including one who survived the impact but died later from his injuries.
Fire	Rhodes, Greece	20	23 September 1972	32 Scandinavians, of which 20 Swedish tourists, died in a restaurant fire.
Air disaster	2001 Linate Airport runway collision, Italy	20	8 October 2001	The Linate Airport disaster occurred when a SAS McDonnell Douglas MD-87 would take-off from Linate Airport but collided with a German-registered Cessna aircraft with four people on board. 114 people on board the SAS plane, including 20 Swedes, were killed along with four people in a baggage handling building that was hit by the SAS plane.
Air disaster	Kalba, United Arab Emirates	20	14 March 1972	Sterling Airways Flight 296 crashed during a flight from Colombo, Sri Lanka to Copenhagen, Denmark, with a stopover in Dubai. After two hours' flight, the plane crashed into a mountain ridge at about 550 meters. All 112 on board were killed, including 20 Swedes.
Fire	Amsterdam, Netherlands	17	9 May 1977	17 Swedes died in a fire at the Hotel Polen. Another 18 people were killed.
Air disaster	Northwood, United Kingdom	16	4 July 1948	16 Swedes, including 7 crew were killed in the 1948 Northwood mid-air collision.
Bus accident	Måbødalen, Norway	16	15 August 1988	Måbødalen bus accident occurred when a bus with children and parents from Kvarnbacka School in Kista crashed against a rock wall in Måbødalen, 180 km from Bergen. 16 people died, including 12 children, and 19 were injured.
Shipwreck	German Bight, Germany	15	22 June 1950	The Viking ship Ormen Friske, a modern copy of the Gokstad ship was wrecked in a midsummer storm in 1950. All on board were killed.
Bus accident	Obertauern, Austria	12	2 March 1965	12 Swedish schoolchildren and 2 Finnish girls on a winter sports holiday were killed when the bus they were traveling in was swept away in an avalanche.
Shipwreck	North Sea	11	8 March 1952	Rossö of Härnösand was lost on the Scottish coast with a crew of 22 men, 11 of whom were Swedes.
Shipwreck	South China Sea	8	8 January 1953	The Swedish tanker Avanti was steaming from New Guinea to Iwakuni in southern Japan when it was split in two parts in the South China Sea. 32 people were rescued and 8 died.
Shipwreck	Cape Arcona, Germany	7	14 January 1993	MS Jan Heweliusz sank in high winds on the night of 14 January 1993, on her way from Świnoujście to Ystad. A total of 55 people died, including seven Swedes.
Air disaster	Istanbul, Turkey	6	19 January 1960	Scandinavian Airlines Flight 871 from Copenhagen on the approach towards Ankara in Turkey crashed and 42 people died, including six Swedes.
Terrorism	Bali, Indonesia	6	12 October 2002	2002 Bali bombings occurred in the tourist district of Kuta on the Indonesian island of Bali. The attack killed 202 people, including 6 Swedes.
Ship fire	English Channel	6	9 June 1955	The 16,000 ton MT Johannishus of Trelleborg collided with a Pananma-registered ship in the English Channel and caught fire. Eighteen crewmen, including six Swedes, were killed in the fire.
Ship fire	Rio de Janeiro, Brazil	5	6 March 1953	Svenska Orient Linien's Sunnanland caught fire in Rio de Janeiro, Brazil were five Swedes were killed.
Shipwreck	Atlantic Ocean	5	25 July 1956	MS Stockholm and SS Andrea Doria collided in fog. A total of 52 people were killed, of which 5 were Swedes who belonged to the crew of Stockholm.
Fire	Palma de Mallorca, Spain	4	18 March 1988	Five people, including four Swedes, died in a hotel fire in Palma de Mallorca.
Air disaster	Los Angeles, United States	4	13 January 1969	Scandinavian Airlines Flight 933 crashed into Santa Monica Bay, approximately 6 nautical miles (11 km) west of Los Angeles International Airport. 15 people died, including four Swedes.
Air disaster	Kastrup Airport, Denmark	4	26 January 1947	1947 KLM Douglas DC-3 Copenhagen accident was the crash of a KLM Royal Dutch Airlines flight from Copenhagen to Stockholm on 26 January 1947.
Traffic accident	Phuket, Thailand	4	3 February 2012	Four Swedish youths died when they were on the road in minibus between Patong in Phuket and Koh Tao in Thailand and collided with a truck that came over on the wrong side of the road.
Terrorism	Lockerbie, Scotland	3	21 December 1988	A bomb explodes aboard Pan Am Flight 103 over the Scottish village of Lockerbie. 270 people died, including the three Swedes Bernt Carlsson, Siv Ulla Engström and Elisabeth Svensson-Mulroy.
Terrorism	Belgium	3	16 October 2023	Two Swedish men were killed and one was injured in the 2023 Brussels shooting when the 45-year old Abdesalem Lassoued opened fire on Swedish football supporters who were on their way to a football match in the King Baudouin Stadium during the UEFA Euro 2024 qualifiers. The victims were 60-year-old Patrick Lundström and 70-year-old Kent Persson. Another man in his 70s was injured.
Terrorism	Brussels, Belgium	2	22 March 2016	The 2016 Brussels bombings was three coordinated nail bombings that occurred in Belgium: two at Brussels Airport in Zaventem, and one at Maalbeek/Maelbeek metro station in Brussels. Two Swedish women died in the attacks.
Terrorism	New York City, United States	1	11 September 2001	The September 11 attacks were a series of coordinated terrorist attacks against civilians and military buildings. One Swede, who worked in one of the Twin Towers, was killed.
Terrorism	Paris, France	1	13 November 2015	The November 2015 Paris attacks was a series of coordinated terrorist attacks occurred in Paris. One Swede was killed in the attacks.

== See also ==
- List of disasters in Antarctica by death toll
- List of disasters in Australia by death toll
- List of disasters in Canada by death toll
- List of disasters in Croatia by death toll
- List of disasters in Great Britain and Ireland by death toll
- List of disasters in New Zealand by death toll
- List of disasters in Poland by death toll
- List of disasters in Ukraine by death toll
- List of disasters in the United States by death toll
