= Tommy Alexandersson =

Swedish serial killer (born 1948)

- Born: Stig Tommy Alexandersson; 1 March 1948 (age 78); Rytterne, Sweden
- Other name: Butcher from Enköping
- Conviction: Life imprisonment
- Penalty: Murder (5 counts)
- Capture status: Incarcerated

Details
- Victims: 5
- Span of crimes: 31 May 1988 – 23 September 1988
- Country: Sweden
- Location: Stockholm County
- Imprisoned at: Västervik Norra Prison

Stig Tommy Alexandersson (born 1 March 1948) is a Swedish serial killer convicted to life imprisonment for five murders in 1988. He is known as the Butcher from Enköping (Swedish: Slaktaren från Enköping) – a nickname that comes from the fact that he killed his victims with a cleaver and butcher knife.

== Early life ==
Alexandersson was born on 1 March 1948 in Rytterne Parish in Västerås Municipality, Sweden. He grew up in the countryside outside Enköping, Sweden, together with three brothers and three sisters. Alexandersson has said in various interviews how his father controlled the family with violence. For instance, the father lifted him up against a wall, hit him in the face with his fists and whipped him with an inner tube. He also said that when he was five years old, his father chased his mother with a large axe so that she had to climb out the window in her underwear. At the age of 14, Alexandersson left home. He drank alcohol and took drugs – and before he turned 20, he was known as a violent man and drunk in Enköping.

== Murders ==
On 31 May 1988, Alexandersson broke into an apartment on Bjurholmsgatan on Södermalm in Stockholm, where his former fiancée and a 53-year-old man were. He hit them in the head with a clothes iron and then slit their throats with a "knife-like object". Then he placed the bodies in the beds in the bedroom, poured out petrol – and set them on fire. Alexandersson was arrested and charged – but the evidence was not enough and therefore, he was released. The public prosecutor (kammaråklagare) Bo Josephson appealed the verdict to the Svea Court of Appeal.

On 22 September of the same year, the same day as the acquittal, Alexandersson was at the home of a couple on Odlingsvägen 34 in Tumba outside Stockholm. At the kitchen table, they drank a bottle of the drink mixer Rosita and a bottle of brännvin (Brännvin special). For unclear reasons, he disagreed with the man. He got hold of a cleaver and a butcher knife. The man had his throat slit. When his 74-year-old father came home he was killed with several stab wounds to the neck. A woman who came to visit was killed with the cleaver. Alexandersson then poured denatured alcohol into the apartment – and set the place on fire. The throats of the three half-burned bodies were so severely slit that the two men and the woman were nearly beheaded.

== Trials ==
Despite the fact that a witness saw Alexanderson completely covered in blood buying petrol at a filling station some distance from the murder scene in Tumba, and despite the fact that the police secured his fingerprints in the apartment, Alexandersson denied any wrongdoing. Huddinge City Court sentenced Alexanderson to life imprisonment. Attorney Peter Althin appealed the verdict. The murder charges in Stockholm District Court and Huddinge District Court were merged in the Svea Court of Appeal. On 17 October 1989, Alexandersson was sentenced in Svea Court of Appeal to life imprisonment for five murders and two counts of arson. At the beginning of December 1989, it was reported that the Supreme Court of Sweden had decided not to review the verdict against Alexandersson.

== Time in prison ==
During his time behind bars, Alexandersson has not had any visits or phone calls from outside. He applied for a fixed life sentence by Örebro City Court in 2008, 2013 and 2018, but was rejected all three times.

In February 1995, it was reported that the cat "Murre" belonging to Norrtälje Prison, had been kidnapped by a woman, but escaped prosecution. Alexandersson, who considered himself to be closest to Murre, intended to appeal the prosecutor's decision.

On 28 April 2014, he applied for a conjugal visit from Hällby Prison outside Eskilstuna, where he was incarcerated at the time. On 28 July, he was allowed to specify what he wanted to do during a conjugal visit. Alexandersson had specified that he wanted to buy toothbrushes, dental floss, a deck of cards, calculators, coloured pencils, postcards, stamps, reading glasses, sneakers, a battery for a wristwatch and submit a lottery system. Following a decision by the Swedish Prison and Probation Service, dated 5 August 2014, Alexandersson (then 66 years old) was released on a guarded conjugal visit. When the conjugal visit took place was kept secret.

In 2017, Alexandersson made news again as he got into a fight with the Swedish Prison and Probation Service – which he believed had thrown away his red Adidas shoes and did not return his stamps. The shoes were one of the five pairs he brought with him to prison. Adidas, Asics, Nike and Mc One. According to the Swedish Prison and Probation Service, the red Adidas shoes were discarded because there were holes in their heels. Alexandersson wanted compensation for this – which the Swedish Prison and Probation Service refused as it was not their responsibility.

As of 2026, Alexandersson remains incarcerated.

== See also ==
- Juha Valjakkala
- Mattias Flink
- Tommy Zethraeus
