= Mattias Flink =

Swedish spree killer

- Born: Mattias Erik Flink; 8 March 1970 (age 56); Falun, Sweden
- Occupation: Military officer
- Years active: May 1993 – 11 June 1994
- Employer: Dalarna Regiment
- Status: Paroled in 2014
- Criminal charges: Murder, attempted murder
- Penalty: Life imprisonment

Details
- Date: 11 June 1994; 02.37 a.m – 03.25 a.m
- Country: Sweden
- Locations: Falun, Dalarna County
- Killed: 7
- Injured: 3
- Weapon: Automatkarbin 5 (Ak 5)

Mattias Flink (born 8 March 1970) is a Swedish spree killer who killed seven people on 11 June 1994, in Falun, Sweden. At the time, he was a second lieutenant in the Swedish Army. He was released from prison on 11 June 2014, exactly twenty years after the murders.

== Early years ==
Flink was born and raised in Falun, Sweden. His mother was a housewife and his father and grandfather worked as gunsmiths with their own shop. At the age of seven Flink joined the Scout Movement. His parents divorced when he was nine years old and the divorce is described as having been calm and sensible. Flink chose to stay with his father in the family house while his mother moved to an apartment just a couple of hundred meters from the house. According to psychological evaluations his mother's departure left deep scars within Flink. It is said that Flink developed some kind of alienation towards women.

Flink attended high school with a focus on Electric Mechanical studies. After his graduation Flink enlisted as a conscript with Dalarna Regiment. He committed himself to become an officer of the Swedish Army and was employed at Dalarna Regiment in 1993.

== Mental health ==
During the spring of 1994 Flink had severe problems with his mental health, resulting in aggression, severe jealousy, sleeping disorders and paranoia. This led to a total mental breakdown. He was reported as having been "thrown out of a bar for being violent against his ex girlfriend".

== Killing spree ==
On 11 June 1994, Flink consumed a large amount of alcohol, then he went home to change his clothes. Dressed in his field uniform he walked to his regiment. He equipped himself with his Ak 5 assault rifle and 150 rounds of ammunition, 5.56×45mm NATO caliber. Flink then set out for a park in downtown Falun where he shot 6 members of the Women's Voluntary Defence Organization at random. Shortly thereafter, he shot two men, a cyclist and a security officer, at a nearby road crossing. Six of the victims died immediately, while another woman died in the hospital (see below). One victim survived the attack.

=== Victims ===
- Karin Alkstål, 22
- Thérèse Danielsson, 20
- Helle Jürgensen, 21
- Lena Mårdner-Nilsson, 29
- Jenny Österman, 22
- Maths Bragstedt, 35
- Johan Tollsten, 26

== History ==
=== Arrest ===
After the shootings Flink sought refuge in a nearby crane. He remained there for some time before he made his way down to walk home along an abandoned railway. It was at this time that two policemen discovered him. Flink fired two rounds at the policemen who then returned fire. Flink was hit in the hip and collapsed. At 03:25 Flink was apprehended and brought to Falun Hospital.

=== Trial ===
In the district court the defense never questioned the prosecutor's description of the crime. The question for the defense was whether or not Flink was mentally ill at the time of the shooting. According to experts, Flink was in a self-inflicted temporary psychotic condition, triggered by alcohol, on the evening of the crime. If Flink was found to be mentally ill he would not be able to be sentenced to prison. The final verdict came in the Swedish Supreme Court; Mattias Flink was sentenced to life imprisonment. This precedent verdict made it possible for the courts in Sweden to sentence people to prison for crimes stemming from and committed during an alcohol-induced psychosis.

=== Time in prison ===
Flink was placed in the Norrköping Prison in Norrköping but was subsequently moved to Beateberg Prison in Skogås outside of Stockholm. When the prisoners of Beateberg learned of Flink's move they arranged a meeting to show their disgust towards his actions of killing innocent women. Flink has been allotted protected identity by Swedish authorities. He has refused to give any interviews. During his years in prison he has been described as a calm and well-behaved prisoner. During the spring of 2008, Flink applied for parole to the Örebro District Court. On 9 June, the court ruled that Flink must go through a psychiatric examination to determine whether he is likely to be dangerous to others before a decision on parole can be made. The examination by the Swedish National Board of Forensic Medicine was finished by 7 July. The victims' families strongly opposed Flink's possible release. Flink was given several monitored short-term leaves from prison, and in May 2007 he was granted unmonitored leaves as he had behaved well during his other leaves. Relatives and families of the victims strongly opposed these leaves and expressed worries about a recurrence of Flink's violence.

=== Conversion of life sentence to a set time sentence ===
In January, 2008, Flink requested that his life sentence be limited to 24 years imprisonment. However, on 3 September 2008, Örebro District Court rejected the request due to the circumstances regarding the case that were "exceptionally difficult" and that a set time punishment has to greatly exceed 24 years.

On 7 July 2010, Flink's request to convert his sentence was approved by Örebro District Court. His punishment was set to 32 years imprisonment, which would have made him eligible for parole sometime in 2015 as prisoners are in Sweden normally released after serving two thirds of their set time sentences. The decision was appealed by the prosecutor. On 21 December 2010, Flink's punishment was adjusted to 36 years by Göta Court of Appeal, pushing his potential parole date to the summer of 2018. After yet another appeal, Flink's punishment was adjusted to 30 years by the Supreme Court making his parole date to the summer of 2014, after serving 20 years in prison. On 11 June 2014, Flink was released from jail on the 20th anniversary of his shooting spree.

== See also ==
- Mika Muranen, a Finnish Army deserter who killed two of his neighbours with a crossbow and one man with an assault rifle.
- Tommy Alexandersson, another Swedish mass murderer
- Tommy Zethraeus, another Swedish mass murderer
- Rickard Andersson, another Swedish mass murderer who carried out the Örebro school shooting
- Sten Fransson, another Swedish officer who committed mass murder in Dalarna
- Second Lieutenant Sanurip, another inlisted mass murderer, committed the massacre a year after Flink
