= List of nightclubs in Sweden =

This is a list of notable nightclubs in Sweden:

== Stockholm ==
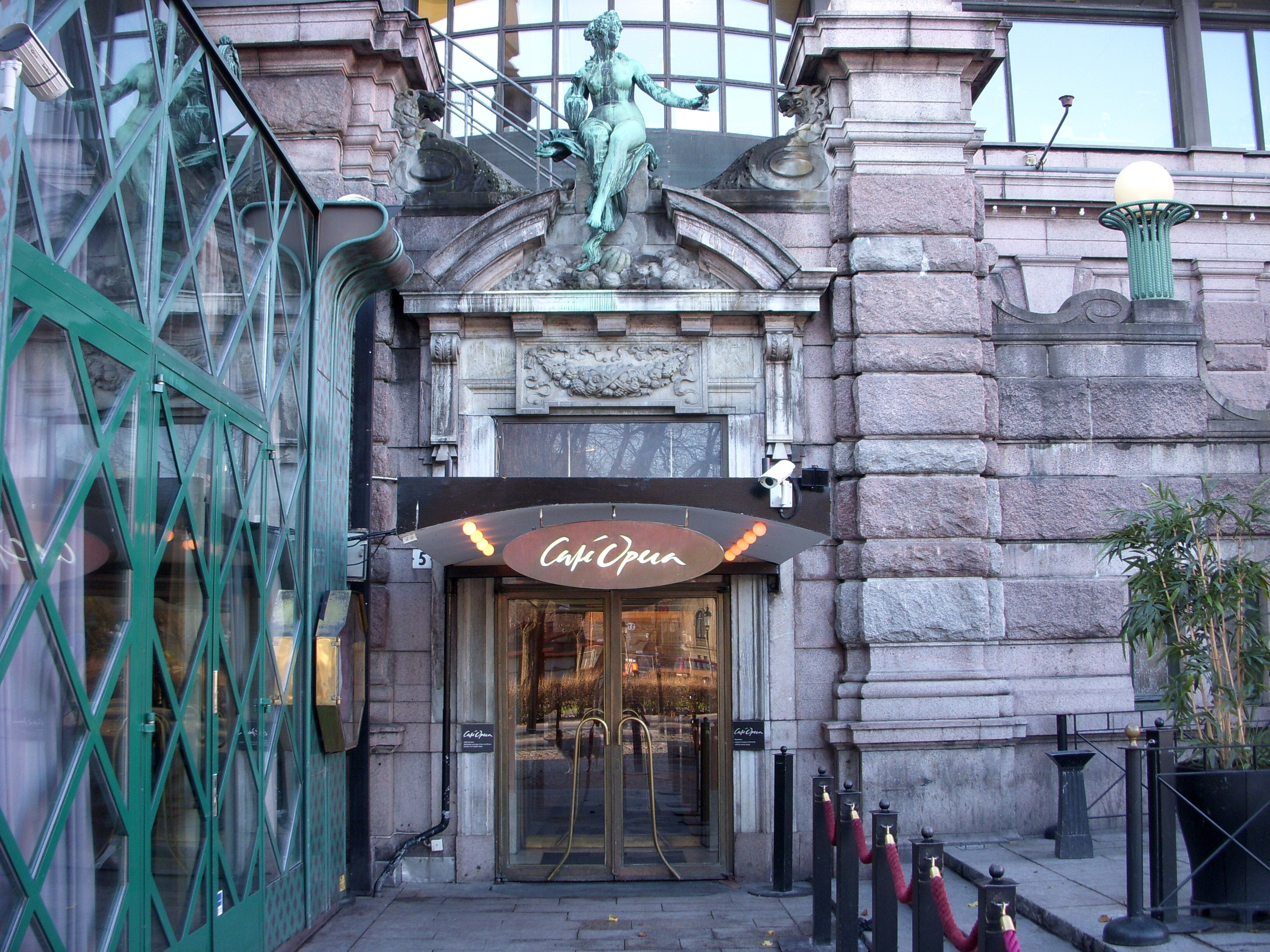
Café Opera

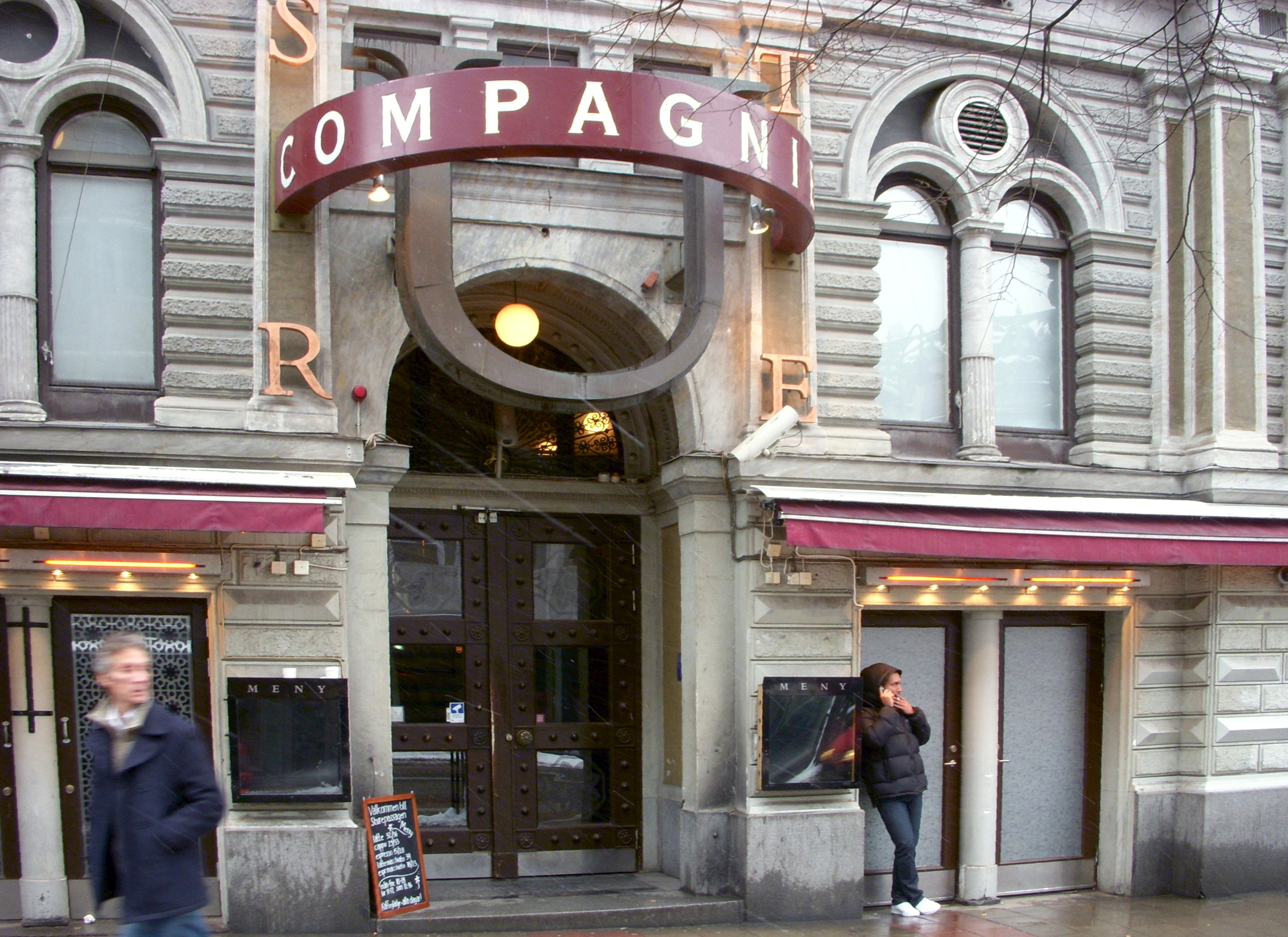
Sturecompagniet

- Alexandra (nightclub) (defunct)
- Bacchi Wapen (defunct)
- Bobbadilla Club
- Café Opera, a nightclub located in the Opera Building. It was formerly a football club.
- City Club (Stockholm nightclub) (defunct)
- Corps Elite (defunct)
- Crazy Horse, Stockholm (defunct)
- Daily News Café, Stockholm (defunct)
- Docklands (nightclub) (defunct)
- Golden Hits (nightclub)
- Grotta Azurra (nightclub) (defunct)
- Kharma (nightclub) (defunct)
- Kolingsborg (defunct)
- M/S Patricia
- Monday Bar
- Mosebacke Etablissement
- Spy Bar
- Sturecompagniet, one of Sweden's biggest and best known nightclubs. Site of a mass-murder in 1994, see Stureplan murders.
- Tech Noir (nightclub)
- Tritnaha (defunct)

== Elsewhere ==
- Barbarella, Växjö (defunct)
- Grand Garbo, Sundbyberg
- Gretas, Gothenburg
- Gutekällaren, Visby
- Palladium (nightclub), Västervik
- Plasticity (nightclub), Gothenburg
- Trädgården, Gothenburg
