= Kisch =

Kisch is a surname. Notable people with the surname include:

- Egon Kisch (1885–1948), Austrian and Czechoslovak writer and journalist
- Enoch Heinrich Kisch (1841–1918), Austrian balneologist and gynecologist
- Frederick Kisch (1888–1943), British Army officer and Zionist leader
- Gabriel Kisch (1917–1998), Romanian murder victim
- Royalton Kisch (1920–1995), British conductor
