= Dan Park =

Swedish street artist

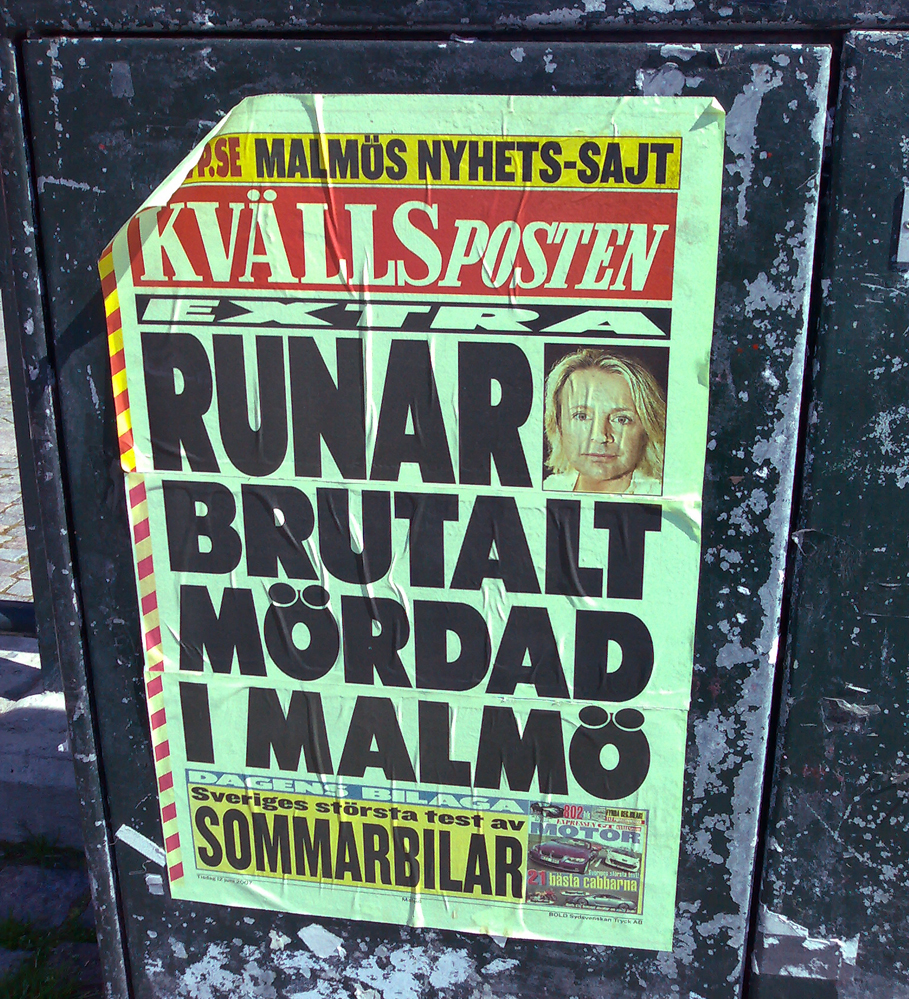
False leaflet by Dan Park in Malmö 2007.

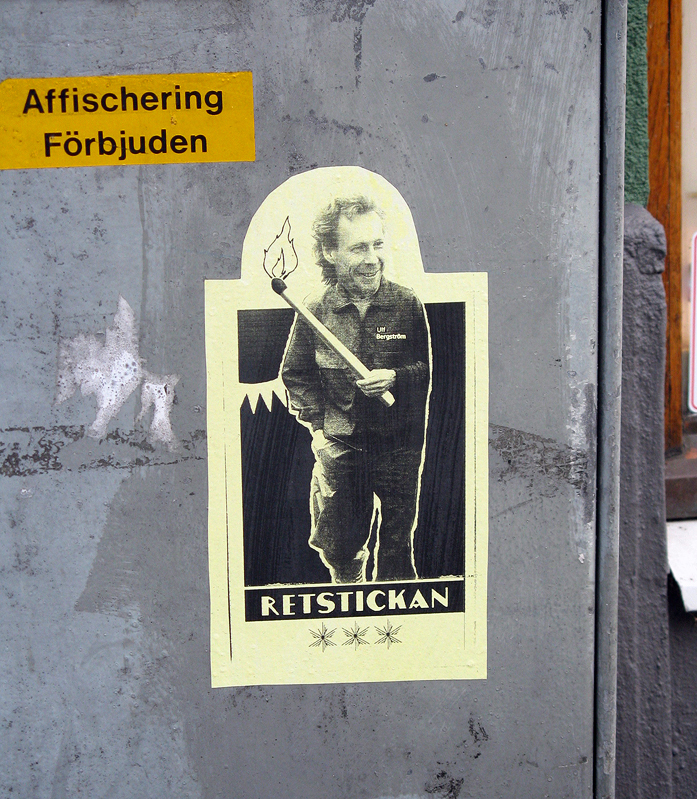
Poster by Dan Park in Ystad 2011.

Dan Fredrik Park (born 4 May 1968) is a Swedish street artist who has been arrested, fined, and sentenced to prison several times by Swedish courts for works and public statements found to constitute incitement against ethnic groups, defamation, and related offences.

== Early life and career ==
Dan Park grew up in Umeå, in northern Sweden. He has stated that he spent his childhood in foster care on a farm, an experience that contributed to his interest in animal rights and his eventual adoption of veganism. As a young adult, he worked at a slaughterhouse, where he sometimes wore clothing bearing animal-rights slogans, including "Meat Is Murder". Park has described opposition to the exploitation of animals as an influence on his artistic outlook.

Park began producing street art in 1988, while living in Umeå. His first known poster depicted Juha Valjakkala, the perpetrator of the Åmsele murders, holding a shotgun, accompanied by the phrase "A man's got to do, what a man's got to do". In 1991, following Valjakkala's attempted escape from custody, Park produced another poster referring to the incident and inviting contributions towards his release, which attracted attention in the local press.

His early work consisted primarily of photocopied posters commenting on contemporary news events, public figures and political controversies. He subsequently developed a practice of attaching posters to electrical cabinets and other public surfaces, particularly in Malmö. Park has explained that he preferred public spaces to conventional galleries because his work could reach passers-by, who were free to respond by removing or altering the posters.

In 2009, a collection of his posters was published under the title Sieg by the Swedish publishing house Bokbål, with the material compiled by artist Magdalena Nordin. Park has stated that he had no particular ambition to achieve recognition through conventional art institutions or gallery exhibitions.

== Controversies and convictions ==
In 2009, Park placed a heart made of pegboard with a swastika, together with a tin can marked “Zyklon B” — the name of the gas used by Nazi Germany in extermination camp gas chambers — outside the Jewish community centre in Malmö. He was tried for incitement to racial hatred but was acquitted.

Park was later convicted of similar offences. Between 2012 and 2026, Swedish courts handed down several convictions against him for incitement to racial hatred and defamation.

In 2011, Park was arrested over a collage poster depicting an Afro-Swedish student activist naked and in chains, alongside the text “Our negro slave has run away” and the activist’s personal contact information. Park had targeted the activist after the activist reported a student party at which people appeared in blackface. In 2012, Park was convicted of incitement to racial hatred and defamation, received a suspended sentence, was fined, and was ordered to pay damages.

In 2014, Park was arrested at the opening of an exhibition of his collage posters. He was sentenced to six months in prison for incitement to racial hatred and defamation, and was ordered to pay a total of 60,000 kronor ($8,700) in damages to four people depicted in his works. The court also ordered nine of his works to be destroyed.

In 2018, Park was sentenced to three months in prison for publicly using racial slurs on social media and alleging that rape culture was common among immigrants. The court rejected his claim that someone else had used his social media account without his knowledge, describing it as “far-fetched”. The sentence was later increased to four months by an appeals court.

In 2021, Park was included in an exhibition at the Centre for Contemporary Art Ujazdowski Castle in Warsaw, Poland. His appearance at the museum drew protests from activists outside the venue. In video footage from the event, one protester is seen holding a mirror with the words “I hope you are not looking at a fascist”. Park was asked whether he was a Nazi, to which he replied, “No, I am a street artist”, and said that he supported freedom of speech for everyone, including “Nazis and Muslims”. He also told protesters that he had visited Auschwitz and showed them a fake Auschwitz tattoo, prompting criticism from those present. When asked whether he sympathised with victims of the Holocaust, Park replied that he “was not born back then” and said that he felt sympathy for people living today. He also compared the Holocaust to the treatment of animals, saying that a Holocaust was taking place in the present because people eat meat and drink milk; Park is known to be vegan.

In 2022, Park again placed a tin can marked “Zyklon B” outside a Jewish community centre, this time in Gothenburg. A few months later, he attached a pegboard in the shape of a swastika to the façade of the Jewish Museum in Gothenburg. He was convicted of incitement to racial hatred and unlawful threats.

In 2026, Park was convicted of several counts of incitement to racial hatred over posts published on the social networking platform X.

In October 2026, Park sparked controversy after placing a sign reading "Jude Free Zone" on the entrance of a shoe store in Stockholm. The sign featured the German word Jude ("Jew") inside a Star of David, reproducing a distinctive element of the Nazi-era yellow badges that Jews were forced to wear during the Holocaust, which similarly displayed the word Jude within a six-pointed star. Park placed the sign in response to an existing "Apartheid Free Zone" sign featuring a map of Israel, claiming that his intervention was intended to expose what he considered the antisemitic implications of the original message. The incident attracted widespread criticism, including condemnation from Sacha Roytman, CEO of the Combat Antisemitism Movement, who drew parallels with the Nazi term Judenfrei ("free of Jews"). Israel's ambassador to Sweden, Tammy Rahamimoff-Honig, also condemned the incident, regardless of Park's stated intentions. Following the controversy, the store owner removed both signs.

== Views ==
Park has been associated with far-right circles. In a 2015 interview with the Nordic Resistance Movement (NMR), a neo-Nazi organisation, he described himself as a “nationalist”, a term used by parts of the Swedish white-supremacist movement. In 2016 and 2017, he took part in demonstrations organised by the Nordic Resistance Movement. In 2018, he posted a photo on Twitter of a ballot paper on which he had ticked Vera Oredsson, a candidate for the Nordic Resistance Movement. He has also been a member of the National Democrats, a far-right party formed in 2001 after a split within the Sweden Democrats.

Park has denied that his works are racist, describing them instead as satirical commentaries on current events and criticism of political correctness in Sweden. He is also known for the debate about freedom of speech generated by his cases and works, particularly in Denmark, where his works have been exhibited in the Parliament building.

== Critical reception ==
In an opinion piece published by Konstnärernas Riksorganisation (The National Organization of Artists), Swedish art critic Robert Stasinski argued that Park’s images do not qualify as art because they are not “open to multiple possibilities of interpretation”, and because neither Park nor his exhibitors have attempted to provide a broader artistic context for them. Stasinski concluded that this was “not a sign that Dan Park is a bad or undeveloped artist, it is probably a sign that he never wanted to be one.”

Artist Lars Vilks, who became known for the controversy surrounding his drawings of Muhammad, has described Park as a defender of freedom of expression. Art journalist Øyvind Strømmen has said that Park’s street art often conveys a message of far-right extremism, and that Park is, at best, a poser and provocateur, but likely worse than that.
