= Murder of Gabriel Kisch =

1998 crime in Sweden

- Scene of murder and body discovered
- Location: 59°16′01″N 18°02′24″E; Sjösavägen 24, Bandhagen, Stockholm Municipality, Sweden
- Date: November 1998 (CET)
- Target: Gabriel Kisch
- Attack type: Dismemberment
- Weapons: Bone saw, bread knife
- Deaths: 1
- Victim: 1
- Perpetrator: Maria Kisch
- Verdict: Guilty
- Convictions: Murder
- Sentence: Life imprisonment (paroled after 11 years)

The Murder of Gabriel Kisch took place in Stockholm in November 1998. The case became one of Sweden's most widely reported and extensively examined homicide investigations. It began when dismembered body parts were discovered in the waters around central Stockholm, initially leaving the victim unidentified. The body had been cut into multiple sections, and forensic analysis later revealed that the head had been exposed to extreme heat, which drew particular attention and added a striking and unusual aspect to the investigation. The careful dismemberment, combined with the method of disposal, indicated deliberate planning and a familiarity with tools.

The deceased was soon identified as 81-year-old Gabriel Kisch, a Romanian-born widower living in Bandhagen, Stockholm. Suspicion quickly focused on his wife, Maria Kisch, who had moved to Sweden from Romania after their marriage. The investigation revealed that the killing and dismemberment had taken place inside the couple's apartment, where evidence included traces of the victim's blood, a saw matching marks on the bones, and plastic bags corresponding to those used to transport body parts to the water. The extreme condition of the head, which had been heated in an oven, became one of the most discussed elements of the case, both in the media and during court proceedings.

The legal process was complex and extended over multiple trials. Initially, Maria Kisch denied involvement and left the country temporarily, and the district court acquitted her despite the forensic evidence and inconsistencies in her statements. However, the Court of Appeal later re-examined the totality of evidence, including expert forensic analyses, and concluded that she had committed the killing and dismemberment. She was convicted of murder, sentenced to life imprisonment, and became the first woman in Sweden to receive a life sentence for a dismemberment homicide.

The case attracted extensive media attention, not only for the unusual and severe nature of the injuries, including the heating of the head, but also for the broader legal and forensic questions it raised. These included the reliability and interpretation of circumstantial evidence, the assessment of injury patterns, and the difficulties of prosecuting a case without eyewitness testimony. Following her conviction, Maria Kisch served part of her sentence in Sweden before being transferred to Romania, where she was released early. This decision prompted criticism from members of the victim's family.

== Background ==
Maria Kisch was born on 13 February 1953 in Romania and had grown up in poverty in a rural village outside Timișoara under the dictatorship of Nicolae Ceaușescu. She was trained as an electrical engineer. She married and had a child, and worked in an industrial plant in Timișoara. After the fall of communism life remained difficult, and her desire to escape repression and hardship drove her toward Western Europe.

In autumn 1995 she was introduced to Gabriel Kisch, then a 78-year-old widower (Note: Gabriel Kisch was born 14 June 1917 in Hungary.); she was 42 and divorced, her daughter already grown. Gabriel, a wealthy Romanian immigrant in Sweden, seemed stable, reliable and financially secure. He promised to secure her livelihood and housing. They corresponded extensively and visited each other over about a year before they married on 30 January 1997. After another year, all documents and permits were ready, and in April 1998 Maria moved to Sweden to live with Gabriel in his two-room apartment at Sjösavägen 24 in Bandhagen, Stockholm.

Gabriel had moved to Sweden with his first wife in 1975 at age 58, drawn by their adult son who had emigrated earlier. They settled into the apartment in Bandhagen and spent much of their free time tending a small allotment garden within cycling distance. In the early 1990s, after his wife died, Gabriel lived solely off his pension; his only interest was the garden and occasional visits with his son's family. He kept some contact with relatives and old friends in Romania, and was invited to return to Timișoara to be cheered up—perhaps even introduced to a hopeful woman. It was under these circumstances that he met Maria. On paper and initially in practice theirs appeared to be a mutually beneficial arrangement. Maria began studying Swedish and proved to be an exemplary student.

Although Maria later claimed in interrogations that their relationship was harmonious, domestic acquaintances reported a very different reality. According to statements from former schoolmates and a teacher, Gabriel was strict and miserly; they recalled that he became furious when he discovered how much money she sent to her daughter, and forbade her from making expensive calls abroad. In private conversations she told a few trusted friends that Gabriel controlled her constantly and, at times, stalked her. He was extremely jealous, and Maria said she disliked sexual intimacy with him. While she was generally shy and reserved, there were also reports of a bold flirtation with selected schoolmates.

== Body discovered and investigation ==
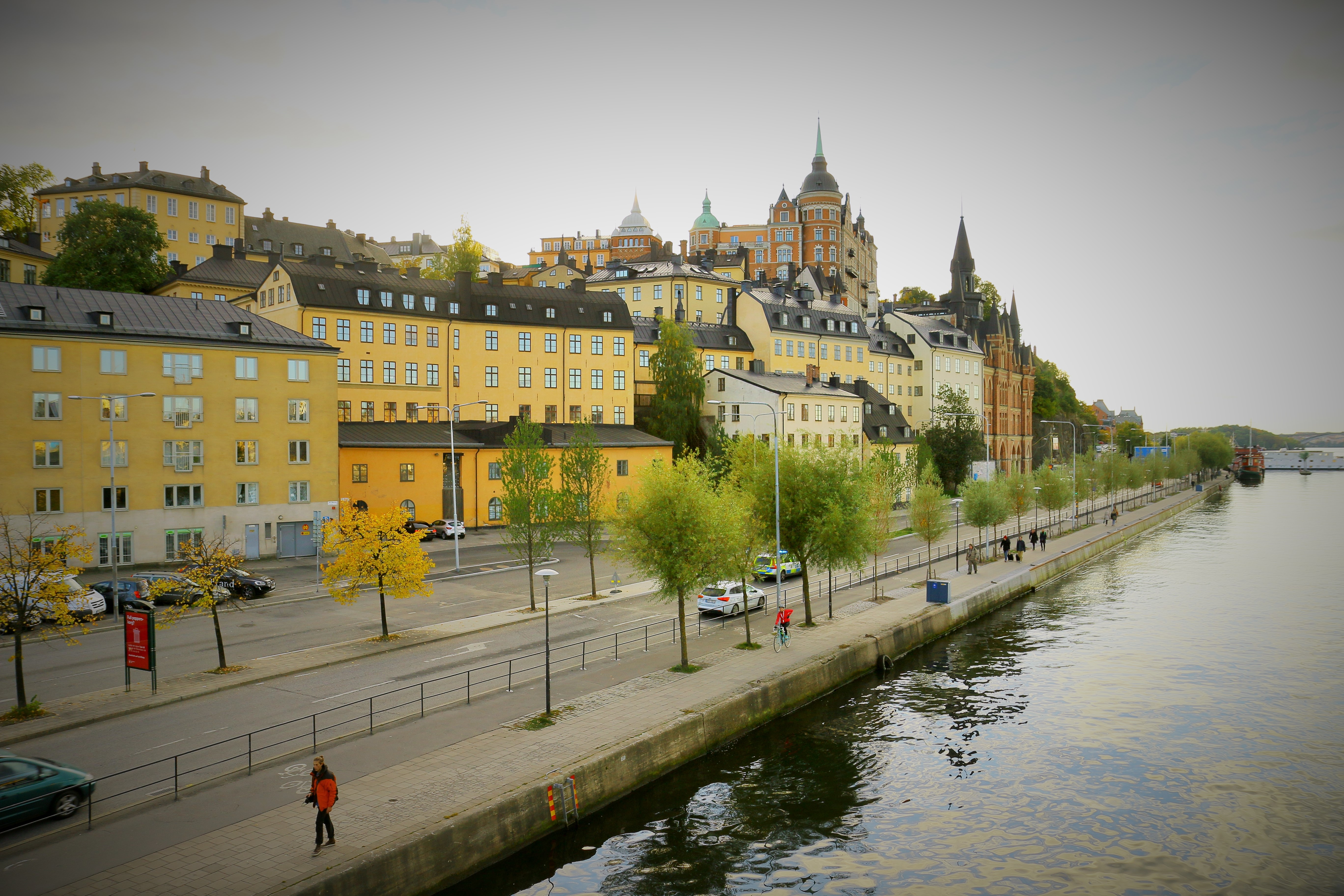
Here in the water off Söder Mälarstrand, the body parts were found

On Monday 30 November 1998 at 23:45, divers responded to a tip from the owner of a houseboat at Söder Mälarstrand in central Stockholm and retrieved a package that had been attacked by birds and fish. The package contained the torso of an older male body; autopsy later confirmed it as human. Over the following week, more informants contacted police — among them a woman had been seen throwing plastic-wrapped packages into the water from a quay in Riddarfjärden. During the search 14 separate body-parts packages were recovered.

One of the packages held the man's genitals and part of his lower abdomen; another package eventually held the skull, which autopsy revealed had been exposed to extreme heat. Subsequent investigation showed that the severed head and brain had been "cooked" in a high-temperature oven in the Kisch apartment. The body had been meticulously cut into 14 sections. Forensic examination showed severe external trauma: three rib fractures near the heart, massive bleeding at the base of the throat inconsistent with strangulation — likely caused by knife or blunt force. In total, 17 serious injuries were found on the torso and head; there were deep bruises under both facial halves, neck, throat, chest, shoulders, back, as well as extensive lesions near the anus caused by blunt force and foreign-object intrusion. According to the pathologists, all these injuries had occurred while the victim was still alive, most within 20 to 30 minutes before death.

At first the victim remained unidentified. Police released a retouched photograph of the heat-treated skull in newspapers. Shortly thereafter, a man contacted authorities claiming the image resembled his father, who had been missing for some time. Dental records confirmed the victim was an 81-year-old Gabriel Kisch living in Bandhagen in southern Stockholm. Suspicion quickly landed on his wife, Maria Kisch, who had moved from Romania to Sweden and married the victim after his first wife's death in 1993.

That same evening the apartment was searched. At that point Maria had fled the country. The bathroom had been scrubbed and disinfected thoroughly — the bathtub drain and a long stretch of waste pipe cleaned with chemical agents in a manner no experienced plumber had ever seen before. A kitchen knife with a 195 mm blade was found; the victim's blood had been detected under the fixed plastic handle. On the balcony authorities found plastic bags of the exact type used to wrap the body parts. Gabriel's son recalled giving his father a "meat-saw" from a hardware store as a Christmas gift, to cut meat at home. Investigators ordered an identical saw blade from Germany and determined its tooth pattern matched precisely the bone-cut surfaces on the spine and other bones of the victim. A round imprint was found in a roasting pan — analysis showed the imprint matched the severed neck bone to the millimeter.

On 21 December 1998 Maria Kisch was remanded in her absence. On 24 January 1999 she returned voluntarily from a trip abroad after reading in a local newspaper that the Romanian-born husband had been murdered and that his wife was wanted by Swedish police. She claimed she only wanted to clear things up and insisted she had no knowledge of her husband's fate. She was arrested that evening in Högdalen, near the couple's apartment in Bandhagen, following a tip, and taken to Kronoberg remand prison at Kungsholmen. Findings found in the couple's apartment were sent for analysis to the genetics department at Uppsala University. Early in the investigation there had been speculation about a possible accomplice — but just before the trial began in August 1999 the prosecution declared that only Maria was suspected.

During the initial interrogations Maria maintained that on the day the first body parts were found she had travelled to Åland, withdrawn money from a bank, and then planned to travel to Budapest, Hungary, to purchase an apartment. When she heard nothing from her husband she claimed she set out to find him. She even returned with 70 kg of belongings — furniture, clothes, the husband's suits, underwear, as well as paintings and jewelry that had belonged to his deceased first wife; some items she left with her ex-husband, some with her daughter.

On 15 April 1999 the Stockholm District Court renewed her remand for the fourth time since her January arrest, as new evidence emerged and investigators disclosed further macabre details. The prosecution alleged that she had killed and dismembered her husband in their apartment, then driven his body parts to Söder Mälarstrand to dump them in Riddarfjärden. The prosecutor stated there was no indication she had acted with an accomplice. It also emerged that after the murder she had given away several of the husband's possessions abroad. Maria continued to deny any involvement.

== Trials and verdict ==
=== First trial ===
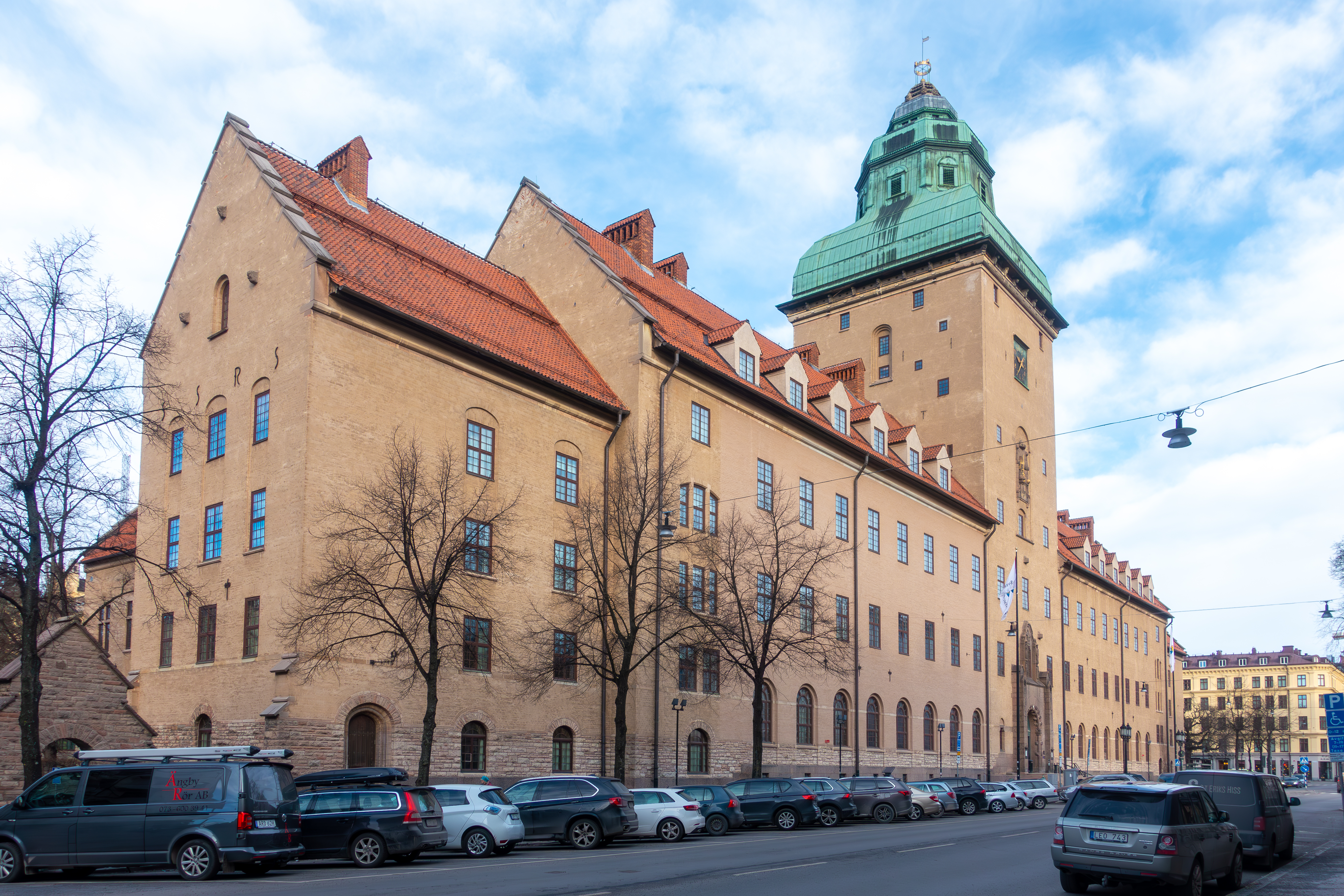
The first trial was held at Stockholm District Court.

The first trial was held in the Stockholm District Court. Despite many inconsistencies in Maria's story, she was unexpectedly acquitted. The court found that although the physical evidence was strong, each piece viewed separately was insufficient to convict. The court also emphasized that the dismemberment had been carried out with such skill — involving precise cuts to remove internal organs and the opening of major joints — that only a trained professional such as a doctor, butcher or master chef could have managed it. Investigators even travelled to Romania to interview relatives, coworkers and acquaintances of Maria, but the court remained unconvinced.

The trial concluded in mid-September 1999. Chief prosecutor Birgitta Cronier demanded a conviction for murder and a forensic psychiatric evaluation prior to sentencing. On 28 September 1999, the court ruled that the evidence was inadequate and ordered Maria's immediate release. On 4 October 1999 the acquittal was formalized. On 7 October 1999 the prosecutor filed an appeal, unusually soon given the usual three-week window before a deadline. The appeal argued that the court had failed to evaluate the totality of evidence, and had omitted important findings.

=== Events between the trials ===
In January 2000 the Legal Council of the National Board of Health and Welfare (Socialstyrelsens rättsliga råd) suggested that the victim might not necessarily have been murdered — seeking to soften the verdict delivered by their own expert. The prosecutor, however, maintained that the district court had dismissed the evidence too lightly and drawn conclusions not addressed during trial.

One controversial point was the expectation that some of the 20 neighbours in the building should have heard the killing, which the court had highlighted. It was never considered whether the building was echoing or whether many of the neighbours were elderly or had impaired hearing. Maria herself claimed the husband had left the apartment at 06:00 that morning to travel to Åland — the same day the body parts were discovered that night.

The court had also ignored evidence that the victim's head had been exposed to intense heat and that nuclear DNA from him had been found in the apartment's oven. Experts hired by the appellate court included forensic medic Göran Sköld from the National Board of Forensic Medicine in Lund, who stated that while specialized knowledge was normally required to dismember a body so precisely, a practically skilled person — especially one trained in engineering and familiar with tools — could have done the job after reading instructions.

He concluded that blunt trauma had caused the death and argued that the fact the corpse had been dismembered suggested deliberate killing rather than concealment. The legal council accepted his conclusions — but especially emphasised that dismemberment alone did not legally prove murder. At this time the prosecutor tried unsuccessfully to have the appellant court impose a travel ban on Maria.

=== Second trial and verdict ===
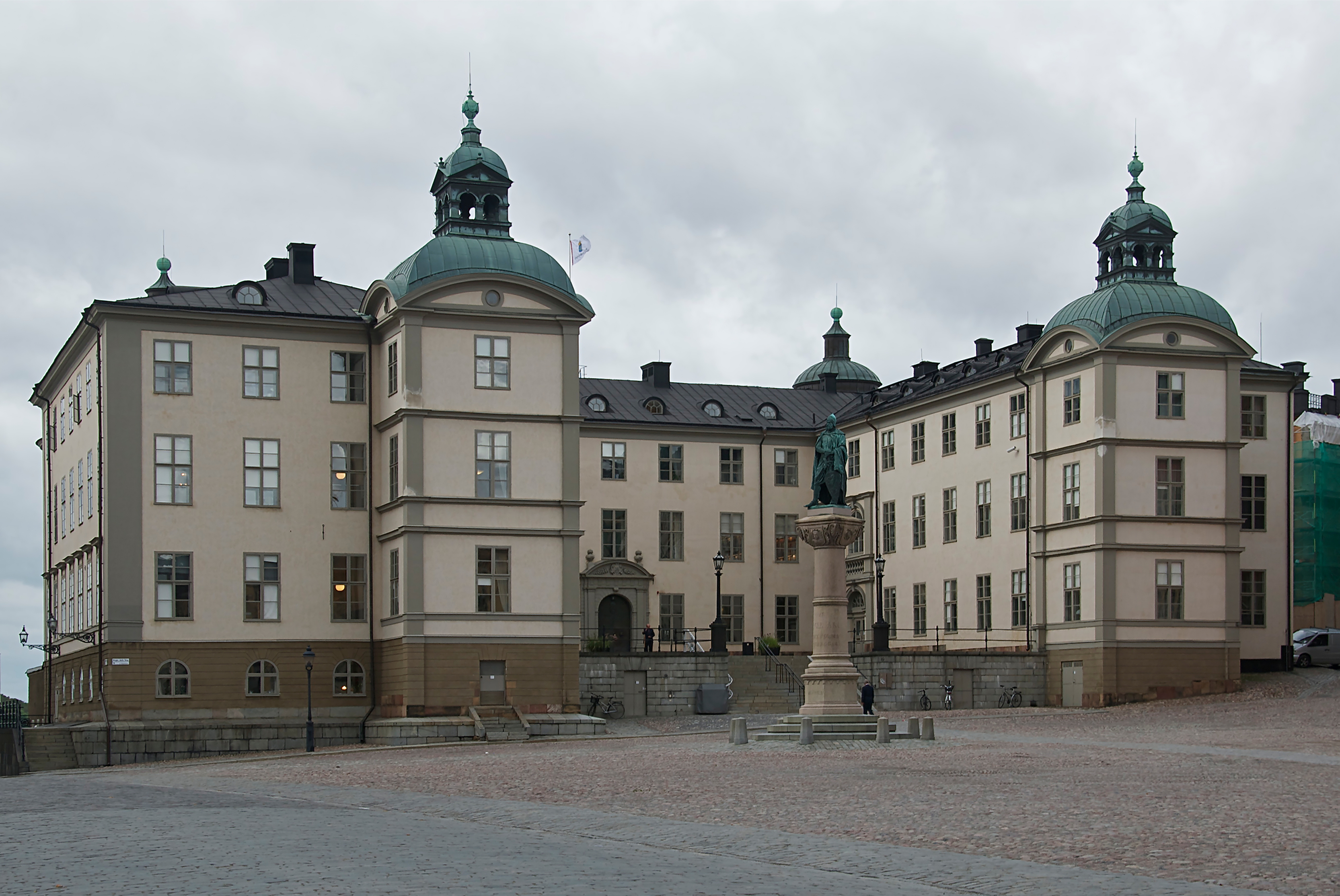
The second trial was held in the Svea Court of Appeal

On 4 February 2000 Maria was remanded by the Svea Court of Appeal on probable cause for murder. On 7 February 2000 the court ordered a full forensic psychiatric evaluation (Rättspsykiatrisk undersökning, RPU), given the compelling evidence against her. The examination took about four weeks. The result showed she was not seriously mentally disturbed under the law, and hence could be sentenced to prison.

On 22 March 2000 both sides delivered their closing arguments. The prosecutor requested a life sentence and permanent expulsion from Sweden. According to forensic and technical investigations, Gabriel had been murdered and dismembered in their Stockholm apartment. The prosecution alleged Maria had killed him with a blunt object to the neck, then dismembered him and removed his genitals — an act characterised as sexually aggressive. The motive was believed to be financial: the 81-year-old man had secretly saved 230,000 kronor in a foreign bank account, money thought to be the reason for the crime. After his death the 47-year-old Maria reportedly travelled abroad carrying his bank papers and several valuable belongings. Maria denied all accusations and insisted the prosecutor had concocted the entire story.

The appellate court concluded on 23 March 2000, and on 29 March 2000 formally sentenced her to life imprisonment for murder and permanent expulsion from Sweden. It was the fourth life sentence ever imposed on a woman in modern Swedish criminal history. The verdict contradicted the district court's acquittal. The court found that the brutal violence before death, the victim's vulnerable condition, the violence's sadistic sexual elements and the heating of the head all pointed unmistakably to murder by Maria. The extreme cleanliness of the bathroom drain, the DNA traces in the oven, and witness testimony of a woman throwing something into Riddarfjärden — matching Maria's description — reinforced the conclusion that the murder and dismemberment had occurred in their apartment.

Despite Maria's claim that her husband had left on the morning of the murder, the court regarded the hypothesis that a random violent stranger had killed and dismembered him — sexually sadistically — as utterly implausible. The totality of evidence, including the precise match between saw blade and bone cuts, plastic bags, heated skull, disposal in the water, and Maria's flight abroad immediately after the murder, convinced the court unanimously.

== Prison time and release ==
After the appellate court's verdict, her lawyer Lars Engstrand announced intentions to apply for a new trial, but no hearing was granted by the Supreme Court. Maria was imprisoned in the women's prison Hinseberg. Less than six years later (Note: Another source says four years.) she was transferred to Romania to serve the remainder of her life sentence. She was released in 2011 — after only five years in Romanian prison — a fact her former stepson and his family viewed as a travesty and a fundamental failure of coordination within the European justice system.

In 2020 it was reported that Maria was living a quiet, well-adjusted life in her native village in southwestern Romania, married, and in regular contact with her daughter and two grandchildren in Switzerland.

== In the media ==
On 13 July 2011, the case was revisited in episode 2 of the Aftonbladet podcast Historien om ett brott.

On 7 April 2015, the case was revisited in episode 12 of the 10th season of the Sveriges Television program Veckans brott.

On 3 June 2015, the case was revisited in episode 7 of the podcast Fallen jag aldrig glömmer.

On 11 September 2017, the case was revisited in episode 4 of the 2nd season of the TV4 program GW:s mord.

On 21 February 2019, the case was revisited in episode 4 of the 2nd season of the Viaplay program Svenska fall.

On 3 March 2020, the case was revisited in episode 9 of the 4th season of the TV4 program Brottsjournalen.

On 28 October 2024, the case was revisited in episode 9 of the 3rd season of the podcast Scandinavian Crimes.
