= Murder of Tove Tönnies =

2022 murder in Sweden

The murder of Tove Tönnies, on the night of 16 October 2022, became a highly publicized case in Sweden. The female suspects were arrested and later found guilty at trial at their first trial. The case became historic as both women became the first females under the age of 21 to be sentenced to life imprisonment. On appeal to the higher Court of Appeal Johanna Jansson received 16 years imprisonment, and Maja Hellman was released.

== Murder ==
Tove Tönnies, a 21-year-old Swedish woman disappeared after a night out at the local nightclub "Nöjet" in Vetlanda, on 15 October 2022. Tönnies had followed friends named Johanna Leshem Jansson, 20, and Maja Hellman home to Jansson's apartment. Jansson and Tönnies had been having a long running feud with each other but had no contact. On the night of the murder, they ran into each other at "Nöjet", and the two women had a physical fight. When Tove was leaving the club, she supposedly met Jansson and Hellman outside, and they decided to reconcile. Tönnies agreed to join Hellman and Jansson as they left the nightclub.

To solve the dispute, the three women went home to Jansson's apartment. At the apartment, Tove Tönnies and Johanna Jansson got into another argument which ended with Jansson beating and strangling Tove Tönnies, with the help of Maja Hellman, who allegedly held a grip around Tönnies arms as Jansson was strangling her.

Several neighbours heard a loud noise after midnight, and rang on Jansson's door. She explained it away, and one neighbour drove Johanna Jansson to Mcdonalds where she bought a cheeseburger. Later, on the night of 16 October, the two women drove Tove Tönnies' body to a wooded area where they later set Tove Tönnies' body on fire. Her body was discovered by police on 3 November. Maja Hellman and Johanna Jansson were remanded into custody the day after Tove disappeared as they had become the main suspects. Tove Tönnies had called and texted her boyfriend about the situation; he had also told her not to go home with the two friends. Tönnies made her last call to her boyfriend at 01:48 on 16 October.

In the year before the murder, Johanna Jansson expressed hate toward Tove Tönnies, writing a hateful song about her and her twin sister.

Jansson allegedly tried to murder Tove Tönnies by setting fire to the house that Tove, her father, and twin sister lived in. She had also told several friends that she wanted to see Tove Tönnies dead. During interrogations, Johanna Jansson admitted to strangling Tönnies, while Hellman only admitted to helping with moving her body after the fact.

== Trial ==
On 27 March the trial for murder started against the two suspects. The prosecutors case stated that both women co-operated with killing Tove Tönnies. On 29 March, the trial ended, the prosecutor asked for life imprisonment sentences for both accused, while the defence asked for both to be released or get short sentences if convicted. Both women were remanded to remain in custody until sentence. On 19 April, both Johanna Jansson and Maja Hellman were sentenced to life imprisonment by Eksjö court. During the trial, Hellman claimed to have slept through the entire murder, while Jansson claimed that Hellman helped her by holding Tönnies arms while Jansson strangled Tove Tönnies to death.

This meant that both Jansson and Hellman became the first women in Swedish history under the age of 21 to be sentenced to life imprisonment.

Together both women were also ordered to pay a total of 1 million (SEK) to Tove Tönnies family and her boyfriend. Both convicted women stated that they would appeal their sentences to the Court of Appeals (Hovrätten).

On appeal to the Court of Appeal (Hovrätten), Johanna Jansson was sentenced to 16 years imprisonment, and Maja Hellman was released for time served.
