= Anders Eklund (murderer) =

Swedish murderer and rapist

- Born: 6 August 1965 (age 61); Torsåker, Sweden
- Occupation: Truck driver
- Status: Incarcerated
- Motive: Sexual
- Conviction: Life imprisonment
- Criminal charges: Murder; Rape; Child pornography charges

Details
- Killed: 2+

Per Anders Eklund, real name Gustavsson, (born 6 August 1965) is a Swedish murderer and rapist convicted of killing a 31-year-old woman in 2000 and a 10-year-old girl in 2008. Eklund is also a suspect in other murder cases currently under investigation, including the unsolved 1994 murder of Malin Olsson in Gothenburg. On 6 October 2008, he was sentenced to life imprisonment for the two murders, one rape in Sandviken 2006 and on child pornography charges.

In September 2014, the Swedish tabloid Aftonbladet revealed that Eklund was a suspect in yet another murder, this time the murder of six-year-old Jasmina Jasharaj who went missing without a trace in 1997. Even though the police have not found her body, they are treating the case as a homicide.

== Early life ==
Eklund was born on 6 August 1965 in Torsåker, Gävleborg County, Sweden.

== Höglund murder ==
On 5 April 2008, 10-year-old Engla Juncosa Höglund went missing on her way home from soccer practice in Stjärnsund, Sweden. When she did not answer her mobile phone, Engla's mother, Carina Höglund, went looking for her and found her daughter's abandoned bicycle in the woods. The mother quickly suspected foul play and stated that her daughter did not have the physical strength to dispose of the bicycle in that way. By coincidence, a man was out testing his new digital camera around the time of Höglund's disappearance and he took photos of his surroundings, including one photo of 10-year-old Engla Höglund riding her bike. The man also took a photo of a red Saab 900 following the young girl. The driver of the red car was later revealed to be Eklund. After the photographer stepped forward and showed police his photos, Eklund was identified and consequently arrested. On 13 April 2008, after days of interrogations by experts from Rikskriminalpolisen, Eklund confessed to the murder and disclosed the location of Höglund's body. During these interrogations Eklund also confessed to the murder of Pernilla Hellgren.

Höglund's death became headline news, as most people had high hopes of finding the girl alive. Höglund's funeral on 10 May 2008 was broadcast live on television on SVT1, the first time in Swedish television history any such broadcast had been made. The decision to broadcast the funeral was questioned and it sparked a debate about whether it was ethical or not.

== Hellgren murder ==
On 4 June 2000 in Falun, 31-year-old Pernilla Hellgren was found murdered. She had been strangled and sexually assaulted. A young girl on her way home had witnessed the attack, and told investigators that she saw a man following Hellgren on her way home from a party in central Falun. DNA found on Hellgren's body was a match to Eklund, who confessed to the murder when investigators in the Engla case presented the DNA evidence that implicated him.

== Trial and imprisonment ==
On 18 July 2008, Eklund was tried on two counts of murder and two counts of rape. In addition to these charges he was also accused of several counts of illegal possession of child pornography. In August 2008, after a relatively swift trial, he was found guilty of all charges and declared mentally fit to stand trial. On 6 October 2008, Eklund was sentenced to life imprisonment for the two murders, one rape in Sandviken 2006 and for the child pornography crimes.

Following the sentencing, Eklund was transferred to the Norrtälje Correctional Facility, a high-security prison north of Stockholm. The Norrtälje Correctional Facility provides a special wing for sex offenders, commonly known as "the sex bunker", in which Eklund was incarcerated.

In June 2014, Eklund was assaulted by other inmates and had to be hospitalized. He was released from hospital and returned to prison the same day.

== See also ==
- Disappearance of Helena Andersson
