= Anders Eklund =

Anders Eklund may refer to:

- Anders Eklund (boxer)
- Anders Eklund (murderer)
