= Handen murders =

1967 murder of two police officers in Sweden

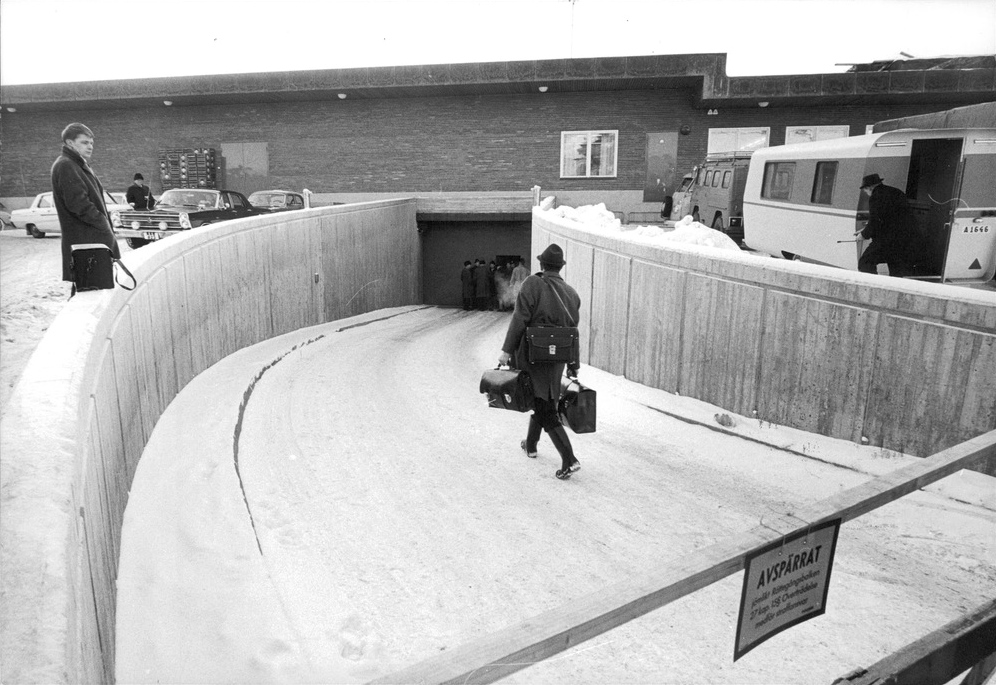
- Cordoned off garage descent to the police crime scene.
- Location: 59.17028°N 18.14082°E; Handen, Haninge Municipality, Stockholm County, Sweden
- Date: 9 January 1967 (CET)
- Target: Police officers, security guard
- Attack type: Shooting
- Weapons: Submachine gun, pistol
- Deaths: 3
- Victims: 3
- Perpetrator: Leif Peters
- Verdict: Guilty
- Convictions: Murder

The Handen murders (Swedish: Handenmorden) occurred on 9 January 1967 in Handen, Sweden, when police officers Uno Helderud and Lars Birger Wikander and security guard Nils Bertil Nilsson were killed. Leif Peters was convicted of the murders. The officers had been monitoring a loading bay near a new shopping mall, suspecting criminal activity. They encountered three men who initially claimed to be security guards but then opened fire with a submachine gun and a pistol, killing all three victims. Peters later confessed and was linked to a wider criminal network.

Peters, born in 1938 in Gothenburg, grew up in a troubled family and had a history of theft and firearms offenses. By the mid-1960s, he had committed multiple burglaries and stolen weapons, including submachine guns, often working with accomplices. The trial of the so-called Handen Gang began in May 1967, involving twelve individuals. Peters' accomplices, Gustav Torver and Leif Wahlkvist, were convicted of theft-related charges but acquitted of complicity in murder. A psychiatric evaluation concluded Peters was not mentally ill. In March 1968, Peters was sentenced to a minimum of twelve years’ detention for the murders and other crimes.

Peters later spent time in a psychiatric ward. In 1972, he was suspected in a separate 1960 murder case that remained unsolved and was eventually closed due to the statute of limitations. He died in 2006 at the age of 68.

== Murders ==
Police officers Uno Helderud and Lars Birger Wikander were assigned to monitor a loading bay next to a newly constructed business center in Handen, south of Stockholm, as it was suspected that a gang of thieves might appear. Near the loading bay, the two officers encountered three men who aroused their suspicions. At first, the men claimed to be security guards responsible for the stores in Handen Centrum, but then they pulled out a submachine gun and a pistol, killing the two police officers along with security guard Nils Bertil Nilsson. In total, they fired 34 shots.

== Investigation ==
The forensic examination determined that the victims had sustained multiple gunshot wounds. Security guard Nils Bertil Nilsson was struck eleven times, police officer Uno Helderud sustained the same number of wounds, and officer Lars Birger Wikander was hit twelve times. Wikander died instantly, while Helderud, although severely injured, managed to drag himself onto the loading dock. There, Peters, after firing at Nilsson a second time, killed Helderud with another burst from a submachine gun. Due to technical reasons, the victims’ bodies remained at the scene for several days during the investigation.

On 9 February 1967, police conducted raids on the homes of sixteen individuals across Sweden suspected of being connected to 28-year-old Leif Peters. The operation uncovered a large criminal network led by Peters.

Peters was arrested without incident on 11 February 1967 on Klostergatan in Strängnäs. He was initially taken to the local police station before being transferred to police headquarters on Kungsholmen in Stockholm, where he confessed during his first interrogation.

Peters had previously been employed by a security company in Stockholm in 1965, but after leaving that position he supported himself through criminal activity. Weapons became involved in late 1966, when he stole, among other items, six submachine guns from an armory on Orust.

He was formally remanded in custody on 16 February 1967. The night before, he attempted suicide by tearing the lining from his jacket and tying it to the bars of his cell window, but was stopped by guards.

== Perpetrator ==
Leif Peters (4 September 1938 – 7 July 2006) was born in Annedal Parish, Gothenburg, and grew up in a troubled family with a father who was periodically alcoholic. He spent two years at Vidkärr Orphanage in Gothenburg and from the age of eleven to fifteen lived at Sundsgården on Svartsjölandet outside Stockholm, a youth home operated by the Salvation Army. (Note: Another source mentions the Salvation Army boys' home Sundskär on the Mälaren Islands.) In 1960, he began working as a waiter at Hotel Apollonia on Nybrogatan 53 in Stockholm, where his father was employed as a head waiter. He carried out his military service with the Svea Life Guards but was discharged after stealing weapons and ammunition to practice shooting in his spare time, reflecting his strong fascination with firearms.

As an adult, Peters studied at Saint Sigfrid Seminary in Uppsala. In the early 1960s, he worked for a security company while residing at Skeppstavägen 18 in Bandhagen. During this period, he was convicted several times for theft and firearms offenses. In 1964, he was arrested after a minor theft at Operakällaren in Stockholm, and a subsequent search of his residence uncovered a pistol linked to a large-scale weapons theft on Orust. Although he received relatively lenient sentences, he continued along the same path. Together with his brother Bo, he became involved in further weapons thefts, and in the autumn of 1966 participated in another burglary of a military depot, during which large quantities of submachine guns and ammunition were stolen.

== Trials ==
=== Trials ===
The trial of twelve individuals connected to the so-called Handen Gang (Handenligan) began at the Assize Court of the Södertörn Judicial District (Södertörns domsagas häradsrätt) in Stockholm, on 29 May 1967. Six of the defendants were women, among them Leif Peters' wife and a female acquaintance, both charged in connection with the crimes. The group had begun operating in 1966, when its three central figures—Leif Peters (1938–2006), Gustav Torver (1940–2024), and Leif Wahlkvist (1941–2024)—were all employed by a security company. Using the knowledge of premises gained from their work as night guards, they carried out a series of burglaries in the southern parts of Stockholm. In total, the group committed around twenty major break-ins, stealing goods valued at approximately 600,000 kronor.

The main trial, referred to as the Handen Case (Handenmålet), formally opened on 7 June 1967 in the Assize Court. On 26 June 1967, the proceedings concerning the Handen murders began. Closing arguments were delivered on 12 July 1967, during which Chief Prosecutor Otto Meijer requested that Peters undergo a psychiatric evaluation or be sentenced to life imprisonment. For Leif Wahlkvist and Gustav Torver, he sought convictions for complicity in murder and prison terms of ten years. On 13 July 1967, the court decided to suspend the case against Peters pending the results of his psychiatric assessment.

=== Verdict and convictions ===
On 14 August 1967, the Assize Court of the Södertörn Judicial District (Södertörns domsagas häradsrätt) sentenced Leif Wahlkvist and Gustav Torver to five years’ imprisonment for aggravated theft, receiving stolen goods, aggravated embezzlement, and harboring criminals. The charges of complicity in murder were dismissed. Of the remaining nine defendants, a 29-year-old man was sentenced to one year and six months in prison for aggravated theft, attempted aggravated theft, receiving stolen goods, and harboring criminals. A 26-year-old man received probation and 100 day-fines for aggravated theft and receiving stolen goods. Peters' female companion was sentenced to probation for receiving stolen goods, complicity in aggravated embezzlement, and harboring criminals. Another woman received a suspended sentence for receiving stolen goods. Charges against one man and four women were dismissed. Wahlkvist and the man sentenced to one year and six months were jointly ordered to pay damages of 1,200 kronor, while Torver was ordered to pay 700 kronor to one complainant. In addition, the 26-year-old man sentenced to probation and day-fines was ordered to pay damages of 5,438 kronor to the state.

The court held that neither of the police officers, Lars Birger Wikander and Uno Helderud, had been killed by the pistol fire in the stairwell of the business center during the night of 9 January. It was considered virtually certain that the fatal injuries sustained by security guard Nils Bertil Nilsson had not been caused by pistol fire. The court concluded that all three victims had been killed by Peters with his submachine gun. With regard to Torver and Wahlkvist, the court found no evidence of an explicit agreement with Peters to bring weapons to the Handen Centrum for use in the manner that occurred. Although they must have understood the risk that the submachine gun could be used, it could not be established that they realized or had reason to suspect that Peters would use it in the way he did. Since it was also not demonstrated that either Torver or Wahlkvist had acted in any way that directly facilitated Peters' attack, the charges of complicity in murder against them were dismissed.

=== Resumed trial of Peters ===
At the end of December 1967, the results of a comprehensive psychiatric evaluation of Peters, carried out at the forensic psychiatric clinic at Långholmen, were submitted. The evaluation concluded that Peters could not be regarded as mentally ill. The trial against Peters resumed on 5 February 1968. In addition to Peters, three other individuals—among them the man who had driven Peters, then the subject of a nationwide search, from Stockholm to Södertälje—were tried for offenses related to receiving stolen goods. All three were in various ways involved in the activities of the so-called Nattvaktsligan ("Night Watchman Gang").

On 29 March 1968, Peters was sentenced to a minimum of twelve years’ detention (internering) for the Handen murders. The court concluded that Peters had deliberately used a submachine gun to kill police officers Lars-Birger Wikander and Uno Helderud, as well as security guard Nils Bertil Nilsson, in Handen Centrum on the night of 9 January 1967. The court was unable to determine who had fired the initial pistol shots, but since the forensic examination had established that those shots were not fatal, the court held that the murder charges against Peters had been proven. He was also convicted of a series of additional crimes. Peters was not granted credit for the more than one year he had spent in pre-trial detention.

== Aftermath ==
Peters was sentenced to life imprisonment but was transferred to a psychiatric ward a few years later.

In May 1972, Peters was formally suspected of the 1960 murder of taxi driver Berit Lundqvist in Huddinge. The case was never solved and the statute of limitations expired in 1985.

Peters died at the age of 68 on 7 July 2006.
