= RMV =

The initials RMV can refer to:

- Rättsmedicinalverket, the Swedish National Board of Forensic Medicine
- Registry of Motor Vehicles in Massachusetts, similar to Department of Motor Vehicles (DMV) in other states of the U.S.
- Results May Vary, the fourth studio album by American rap rock band Limp Bizkit
- Rhein-Main-Verkehrsverbund, a German rail transit association
- Rijksmuseum voor Volkenkunde, the National Museum of Ethnology in Leiden, Netherlands
- Royal Mail Vessel, a mail ship prefix
- R. M. Veerappan (1926–2024), Indian film producer, screenwriter and politician
