= Disappearance of Helena Andersson =

1992 missing person case in Sweden

Helena Andersson
- Born: 1970; Sweden
- Disappeared: 14 June 1992 (aged 21–22); Mariestad, Sweden
- Status: Missing for 33 years, 7 months and 30 days
- Known for: Mysterious disappearance

22-year-old Helena Andersson disappeared on 14 June 1992 in Mariestad, Sweden. Since then, several suspects in her disappearance have been arrested and later released without charge. The disappearance has received extensive media attention since 1992.

== Disappearance ==
Helena Andersson had been at a friend’s housewarming party in Töreboda; later in the evening, she and a few friends decided to continue partying at the Stadshotellet nightclub in central Mariestad. At 2 in the morning, she headed home by foot; an hour later, several witnesses heard a woman screaming. About 100 m (330 ft) from her parents' home, Andersson's rings and sandals were later found. Also found were drips of blood. She has not been heard from since. The first man to be a suspect was a Danish man who witnesses had seen driving a white car, allegedly picking up Helena Andersson and driving away from the Stadshotellet. He was arrested and later released.

== Investigation and arrests ==
In August 2019, DNA tests found traces of three different people on her sandals. In August 2021, a man in his 60s was arrested in connection with Helena Andersson's disappearance.

He was later released but remains a suspect in her disappearance. In 2020, the Swedish police special cold case group in Gothenburg started investigating the case. During the evening, Helena had called her sister to ask her if she had seen her wallet; her sister told her she would pay for a taxi home. Helena decided to walk home anyway.

Two rings and the sandals she had been wearing were found the day after her disappearance. Several witnesses told police they saw a white or possibly light coloured car near the place where Helena Andersson's belongings were found. The 60-year-old suspect had a white car at the time of Helena Andersson's disappearance; since then, the car had been scrapped. This information was revealed to the public in 2021. Witnesses heard a loud scream identified by them as that of a woman.

In 2017, another man was arrested in suspicion of the disappearance but he was also released later. He was known in media as "the man with the pilot glasses".

In 2010, a white Volvo 744 was examined for evidence by investigators, due to tips from the public. It formerly belonged to an 80-year-old man who had died in a house fire. The car was deemed to not have anything to do with her disappearance. In September 2021, investigators revealed that the 60-year-old suspect's DNA had been sent for analysis to the National Forensic Centre, to be matched to the blood traces found on her sandals.

After his arrest, police also searched his home and the area where Helena disappeared, without revealing any results to media.

Her disappearance has also been linked to murderer Anders Eklund, but no charges have been brought.

On 20 June 2022, Swedish prosecutors handling the case decided to close all investigations on the case. It will only be re-opened if new evidence emerges.

== In media ==
The disappearance has been extensively mentioned in Swedish media, and Efterlyst, Veckans Brott, and Sveriges Radio have produced documentaries about the case.

In April 2021, Danish author Lotte Dalgaard published the book Mardrömmen i Mariestad — Historien om Helena Anderssons försvinnande (Nightmare in Mariestad — Story of Helena Andersson's disappearance).

Criminologist Leif GW Persson states that he is certain he knows who kidnapped and murdered Helena Andersson, and has claimed to have spent over 1000 hours investigating the case.

== See also ==
- List of people who disappeared mysteriously (2000–present)
