= John Ausonius =

Swedish criminal (born 1953)

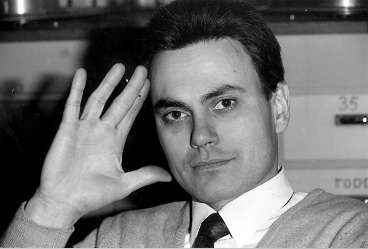
- John Ausonius in the projection booth of the Astoria cinema in Stockholm, 1986
- Born: Wolfgang Alexander Zaugg; 12 July 1953 (age 73); Lidingö, Sweden
- Other names: Lasermannen ("the Laser Man"); Cykelrånaren ("the Bicycle Robber")
- Status: Incarcerated at Österåker Prison
- Motive: Racism
- Convictions: Two counts of murder, ten counts of attempted murder, nine counts of robbery
- Penalty: Life imprisonment

Details
- Date: August 3, 1991 – February 23, 1992
- Locations: Stockholm, Uppsala, Frankfurt
- Killed: 2
- Injured: 10

John Wolfgang Alexander Ausonius (born Wolfgang Alexander Zaugg, 12 July 1953), known in the media as Lasermannen ("the Laser Man"), is a Swedish far-right criminal; he was convicted of murder and 10 bank robberies. Between August 1991 to January 1992, he shot eleven people in the Stockholm and Uppsala area, most of whom were immigrants, killing one and seriously injuring the others. He first used a rifle equipped with a laser sight (hence his nickname), and later switched to a revolver. He was arrested in June 1992, and sentenced to life imprisonment in January 1994. Additionally, in February 2018, he was sentenced to life imprisonment in Germany for the 1992 murder of Holocaust survivor Blanka Zmigrod.

== Early life ==
Ausonius was born Wolfgang Alexander Zaugg in Lidingö, northeast of Stockholm. He is the son of a Swiss father and a German mother, both of whom had emigrated to Sweden. He grew up in Vällingby, a working-class suburb of Stockholm. According to newspaper reports, he was bullied as a child because of his non-Swedish background, which manifested in him being teased for having very black hair and brown eyes. As an adult, he bleached his hair blonde, used blue contact lenses and legally changed his name. Initially, he changed his name to John Wolfgang Alexander Stannerman, and later to John Wolfgang Alexander Ausonius. He went to the German School in Stockholm, an international school, but dropped out before graduating. He later completed his secondary school education in an adult education programme. Ausonius was accepted into the Royal Institute of Technology, but dropped out after a couple of years of unsuccessful study.

In 1986, following the Olof Palme assassination, Ausonius, then named John Stannerman, was one of the police's initial suspects. However, Stannerman could not be linked to the murder as he was incarcerated at the time, serving a sentence for multiple counts of assault. In prison, he became an acquaintance of Miro Barešić, a member of Croatian National Resistance, a Croatian émigré anti-communist organization created by members of the fascist Ustaše movement. Barešić was imprisoned for the 1971 murder of Vladimir Rolović, the Yugoslav ambassador to Sweden.

Ausonius developed a hatred for Communists, Social Democrats, and immigrants, while also craving wealth. He worked a low-paying job as a taxi driver, but later started trading in stocks and bonds. His talent for the market quickly earned him a fairly large fortune, resulting in him adopting the yuppie lifestyle. By the late 1980s, he owned a luxurious apartment, a Toyota Supra (rather than owning a Porsche, which many other yuppies drove at that time, as he despised the company), and a mobile phone (before the 1990s, such a device was a luxury item usually associated with a jet-set lifestyle). However, poorly chosen investments depleted his fortune. This was further aggravated by an addiction to gambling. As a result of the latter, during a trip to Germany, he found himself in dire economic circumstances. With funds running out, Ausonius turned to bank robbing to maintain his lifestyle. He performed more than eighteen robberies, largely in an identical fashion.

== Shooting spree ==
In 1979, Ausonius became a Swedish citizen. He had a strong hatred for immigrants and foreigners. These beliefs led him to start looking for immigrant criminals to kill. Eventually, he was tired of this and decided to simply kill any immigrant. He hoped that this way, he would scare all immigrants out of Sweden.

Between 1981 and 1982, Ausonius served in the Swedish army and thus learnt how to use weapons. But his personal weapons were of poor quality, very likely because Ausonius had modified them. He sawed off the barrel and the stock of his first rifle to make it shorter, and he fitted the Smith & Wesson revolver with a silencer. This modification may have been the key to his failure in killing most of his victims as it deviated the bullet's trajectory and consequently caused him to miss his victims. It was amateurishly done and damaged the weapon's performance.

- 3 August 1991: Ausonius shot David Gebremariam, a 21-year-old immigrant from Eritrea. Gebremariam was shot in the back, but survived. Two of the victim's friends said they saw a circle of red light on his body before they heard the shot.
- 21 October 1991: Shahram Khosravi, a 25-year-old student of Iranian origin, was shot in the face outside the Stockholm University. Khosravi survived the attack.
- 27 October 1991: Dimitrios Karamalegos, a homeless man of Greek origin, was shot twice in the stomach. Although wounded, he survived. Karamalegos reported seeing a bright red light prior to hearing the shots.
- 1 November 1991: During the middle of the day, Ausonius entered a restaurant kitchen in Stockholm and shot Heberson Vieira Da Costa, a musician from Brazil. Da Costa was shot once in the head and several times in the stomach. Despite these injuries, Da Costa survived. He reported to police that he saw a red light before he was shot. Da Costa was also able to provide a good description of Ausonius.
- 8 November 1991: Ausonius mortally wounded Jimmy Ranjbar, another Iranian student, who died the following day.

Ausonius took a trip to the United States between the first and second waves of shooting. He visited Las Vegas to gamble and also journeyed to the Grand Canyon. He then returned to Sweden.

- 22 January 1992: In Uppsala, Ausonius approached a couple in a café outside the Linnaeus Garden, and shot Erik Bongcam-Rudloff, a PhD student in medical sciences, in the head. Bongcam-Rudloff survived, and is now a scientist representing Sweden in several international scientific networks.
- 23 January 1992: Having returned to Stockholm, Ausonius shot Charles Dhlakama, a bus driver originally from Zimbabwe, in the middle of the day. Dhlakama was shot in the chest but survived. That evening, Ausonius entered a Somali club and shot two men, both of whom survived.
- 28 January 1992: Ausonius shot Isa Aybar, an immigrant of Assyrian origin, four times in the head and arm. Aybar was seriously wounded, but managed to call the police and survived.
- 30 January 1992: In Hägerstensåsen, Ausonius shot Hasan Zatara, a Palestinian store owner, in the head, paralyzing but not killing him. Zatara's son Imad Zatara is a footballer.

== Capture and trial ==
The police started a massive manhunt (second in size only to the hunt for Olof Palme's killer). On 12 June 1992, during a bank robbery, Ausonius was arrested. He later assaulted his own lawyer in court and spent the rest of his trial in handcuffs. He was convicted of murder and robbery, but could not be linked to all of the shootings (although he confessed to all of them in 2000). He was sentenced to life imprisonment and was later incarcerated at Kumla Prison. In June 2012, he was transferred to Österåker Prison.

Ausonius has applied to have his life sentence commuted to an arranged term on three occasions, in 2008, 2010 and 2012. The court has rejected his application on all occasions. On 2 November 2012, his third appeal was rejected by the Örebro District Court. On all three occasions the National Board of Forensic Medicine determined that there was a risk that Ausonius would re-offend due to his autism and personality disorder, which the court took into consideration when making its decision.

== Trial for German murder ==
In 2016, Ausonius was extradited to Germany to face trial for the 23 February 1992 murder in Frankfurt of Blanka Zmigrod, a 68-year-old Holocaust survivor. While investigating, German police looked into ties to far-right terror group National Socialist Underground. Ausonius did not oppose being extradited under the condition that any sentence received would be served in Sweden.

On 21 February 2018, he was found guilty and sentenced to life imprisonment in Germany. Prosecutors had charged him with stealing her handbag after killing her because he thought she had taken an electronic device that he used to save his bank account numbers. Following his conviction, German prosecutors had to determine if his sentence would be served in Sweden. Ausonius appealed the verdict with the Federal Court of Justice confirming the verdict in November. In January 2019, Ausonius was extradited back to Sweden to serve his sentences.

== Media ==
The journalist Gellert Tamas wrote a book about the case, Lasermannen – en berättelse om Sverige (2002), which became a bestseller. The author links Ausonius and his life story with Sweden in general, speculating that his actions were in part explained by a surge of far-right political and xenophobic sentiments in the country in the early 1990s, including the success of the right-wing New Democracy (Sweden) party in the election. According to Tamas, it could also be one of many attempts by Ausonius to prove his identity as a "true Swedish man" by separating himself from immigrants.

In 2005, the book was adapted into a play, and the same year SVT produced a three-part TV miniseries, which premiered on 23 November. Ausonius was played by David Dencik.

== Engagement ==
In late April 2006, the daily Aftonbladet revealed that John Ausonius had become engaged to an anonymous 23-year-old woman, who had fallen in love with him after having seen a recent television miniseries. According to the paper, a friend of the woman said the couple were planning to move abroad after Ausonius's putative release from prison. The couple are no longer together.
