= Mika Muranen =

Finnish murderer (born 1971)

Mika Kalevi Muranen (born 1971, Kotka, Finland) is a Finnish murderer who shot three people dead with an assault rifle and a crossbow in April 1994 and was subsequently sentenced to life imprisonment. After multiple appeals for parole, he was released in 2014.

== Murders ==
Muranen, a military conscript, returned to his barracks in Hamina from a holiday on Sunday, 17 April 1994, stole an Rk 62 assault rifle from the barracks and fled to his hometown Kotka. The next day, still dressed in his uniform, he entered his neighborhood and fatally shot two of his neighbors, Reino Vulkko, 53, and his wife Sirkka, 54, with a crossbow he had taken from his home. On 19 April, he fatally shot a postman, Matti Olli, aged 45, with the assault rifle. He also shot randomly at nearby houses, escaping into the forest with his dog. During the chase, police shot the dog with a submachine gun, while Muranen returned fire with the assault rifle. The police chased him for a day before slightly wounding him. After he was arrested he expressed regret that his military service would be terminated. Muranen was found to be competent to stand trial. Kotka district court sentenced him to life in prison on three counts of murder, eight counts of attempted murder, and three counts of attempted manslaughter. He was sent to a prison in Mikkeli.

== Parole ==
In 2004, after serving 10 years, Muranen was transferred to an open jail in Laukaa. In 2006, while serving his sentence in Laukaa, he gave his first interview to the Finnish crime magazine Alibi. Muranen applied for parole several times: 2006, 2007, 2010 and 2011. In September 2013 Helsinki court of appeal finally granted parole. Muranen was released from prison in September 2014.

== See also ==
- Mattias Flink

== Literature ==
- Markkula, Hannes: Suomalainen murha 1991–1994.
