= Åmsele =

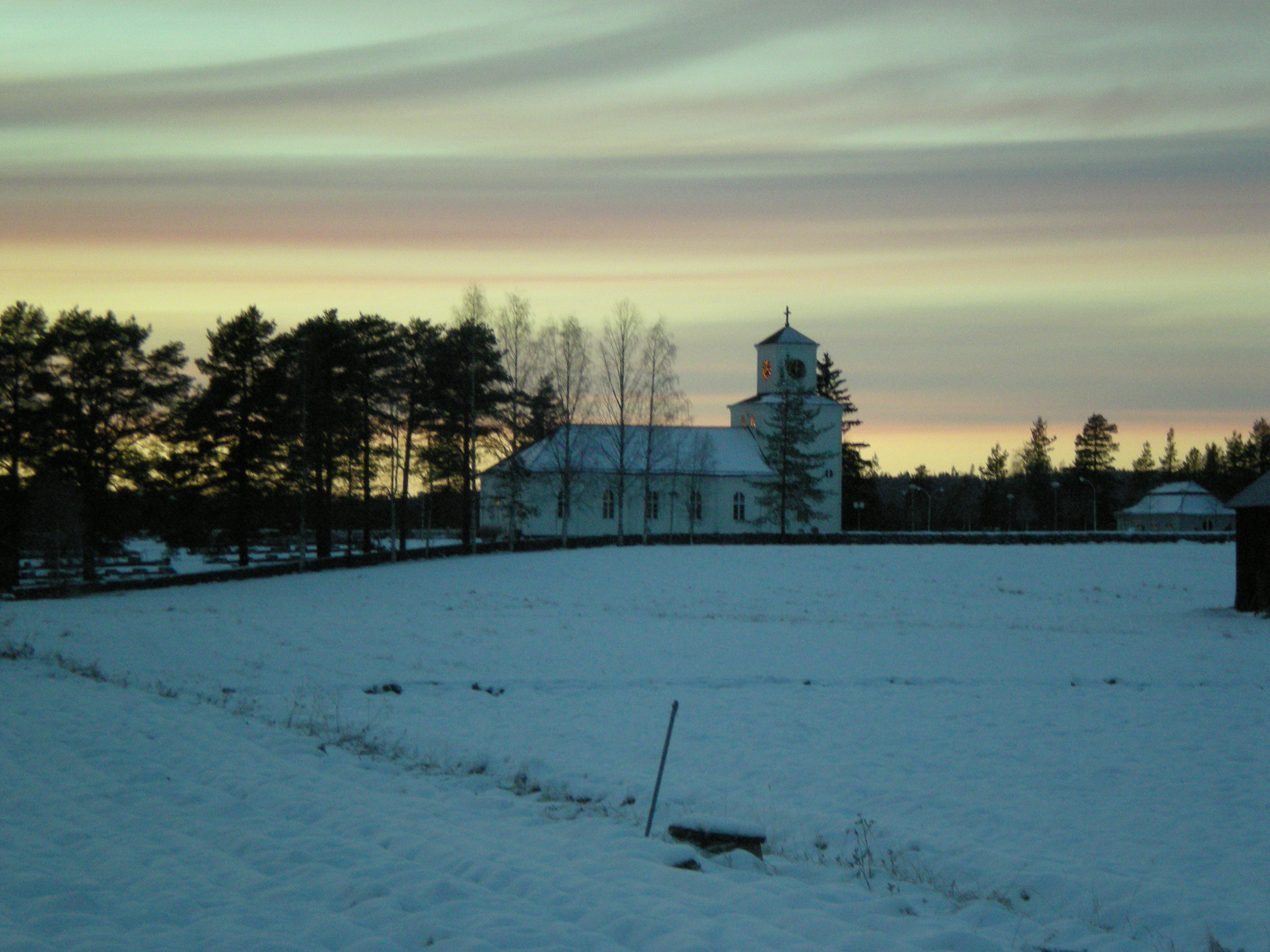
- Åmsele Church

- Location within Västerbotten Location within Sweden
- Coordinates: 64°32′N 19°20′E
- Country: Sweden
- Province: Västerbotten
- County: Västerbotten County
- Municipality: Vindeln Municipality

Area
  - Total: 0.81 km^{2} (0.31 sq mi)

Population (31 December 2010)
  - Total: 209
  - Density: 257/km^{2} (670/sq mi)
- Time zone: UTC+1 (CET)
  - Summer (DST): UTC+2 (CEST)

Åmsele (Swedish pronunciation: [ˈɔ̌mːsɛlɛ]) is a locality situated in Vindeln Municipality, Västerbotten County, Sweden with 209 inhabitants in 2010.

== See also ==
- Åmsele murders
