= Café Opera =

Café and nightclub in Stockholm, Sweden

Coordinates: 59°19′48″N 18°4′15″E

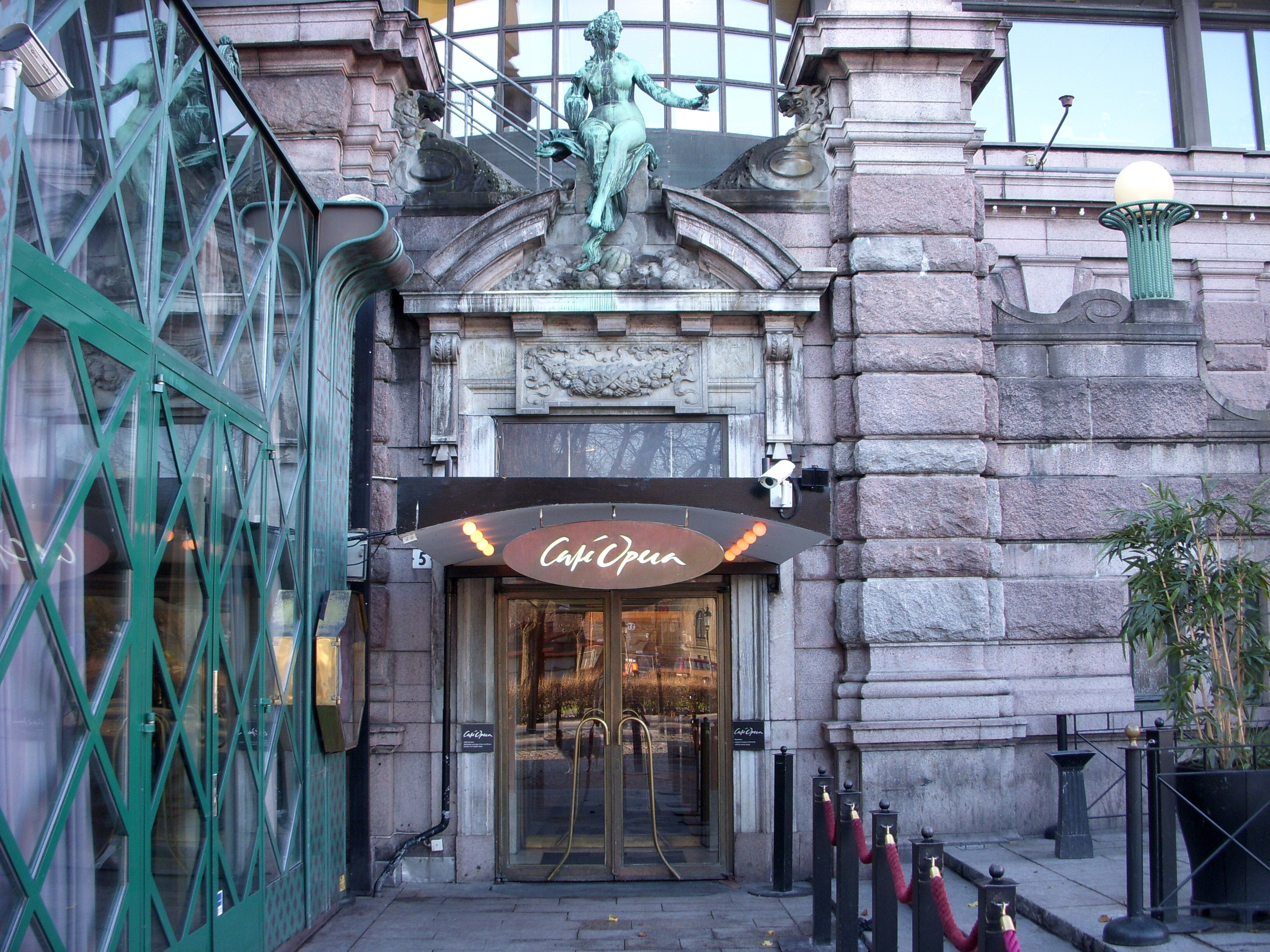
Entrance of Café Opera

Café Opera is a café and nightclub in Stockholm, Sweden in the Royal Swedish Opera building and part of the Opera Cellar (Operakällaren). It serves as a bistro, brasserie and tearoom during the day but becomes one of Sweden's most famous and busiest nightclubs after 10pm. It opened in 1980. On the ceiling are paintings by Vicke Andrén.

In 1991, the owner of Café Opera, Alessandro Catenacci, founded the football club FC Café Opera. The club played in the Swedish Second League until 2005 when it merged with Väsby IK to form FC Väsby United.
