= Stjärnsund =

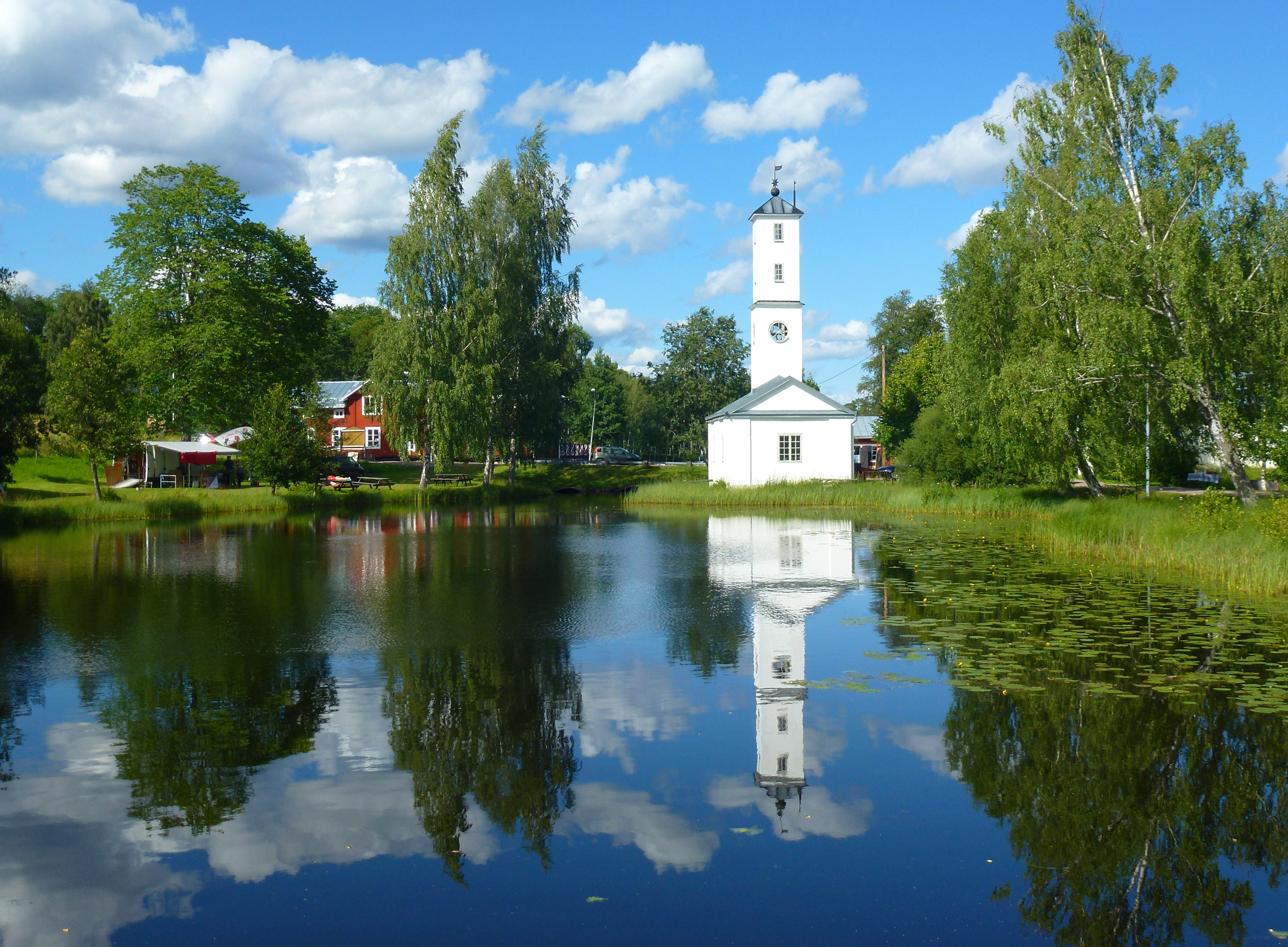

- Location within Dalarna Location within Sweden
- Coordinates: 60°25′56″N 16°12′45″E
- Country: Sweden
- Province: Dalarna
- County: Dalarna County
- Municipality: Hedemora Municipality

Area
  - Total: 0.51 km^{2} (0.20 sq mi)

Population (31 December 2010)
  - Total: 161
- Time zone: UTC+1 (CET)
  - Summer (DST): UTC+2 (CEST)

Stjärnsund (Swedish pronunciation: [ɧæɳˈʂɵnːd]) is a village in Hedemora Municipality, Dalarna County, Sweden, with 161 inhabitants in 2010.

== Etymology ==
The name is derived from the Swedish words "stjärna" (star) and "sund" (strait).
