= Swedish National Forensic Centre =

National forensic laboratory of Sweden

The Swedish National Forensic Centre (Swedish: Nationellt forensiskt centrum, NFC) — previously known as the National Swedish Criminal Police Registry and Forensic Laboratories (1939–1964) (Swedish: Statens kriminaltekniska anstalt, SKA) and the National Swedish Laboratory of Forensic Science (1964–2015) (Swedish: Statens kriminaltekniska laboratorium, SKL) — is a Swedish government agency, organized under the Ministry of Justice as a department of the Swedish Police Authority. It is tasked with assisting the Swedish police in investigating crimes. The agency performs laboratory analyses of samples which have been taken from various types of crime scenes. The laboratory has expertise in most science disciplines and uses technology to find and preserve trace evidence and to establish links between people, places and objects.

== Organisation ==
NFC is run by the head of the lab, under him or her there is a staff and an administrative unit. Below them there are four units:

- the biological unit,
- the drug analysis unit,
- the chemical and technical unit, and
- the document and information technology unit.

Apart from forensic analysis the staff of the lab performs research and development in the field of forensic sciences as well as teaching forensic science. The lab has about 285 employees.

== See also ==
- Swedish National Board of Forensic Medicine
