= Sturecompagniet =

Nightclub in Stockholm, Sweden

Coordinates: 59.3365°N 18.0735°E

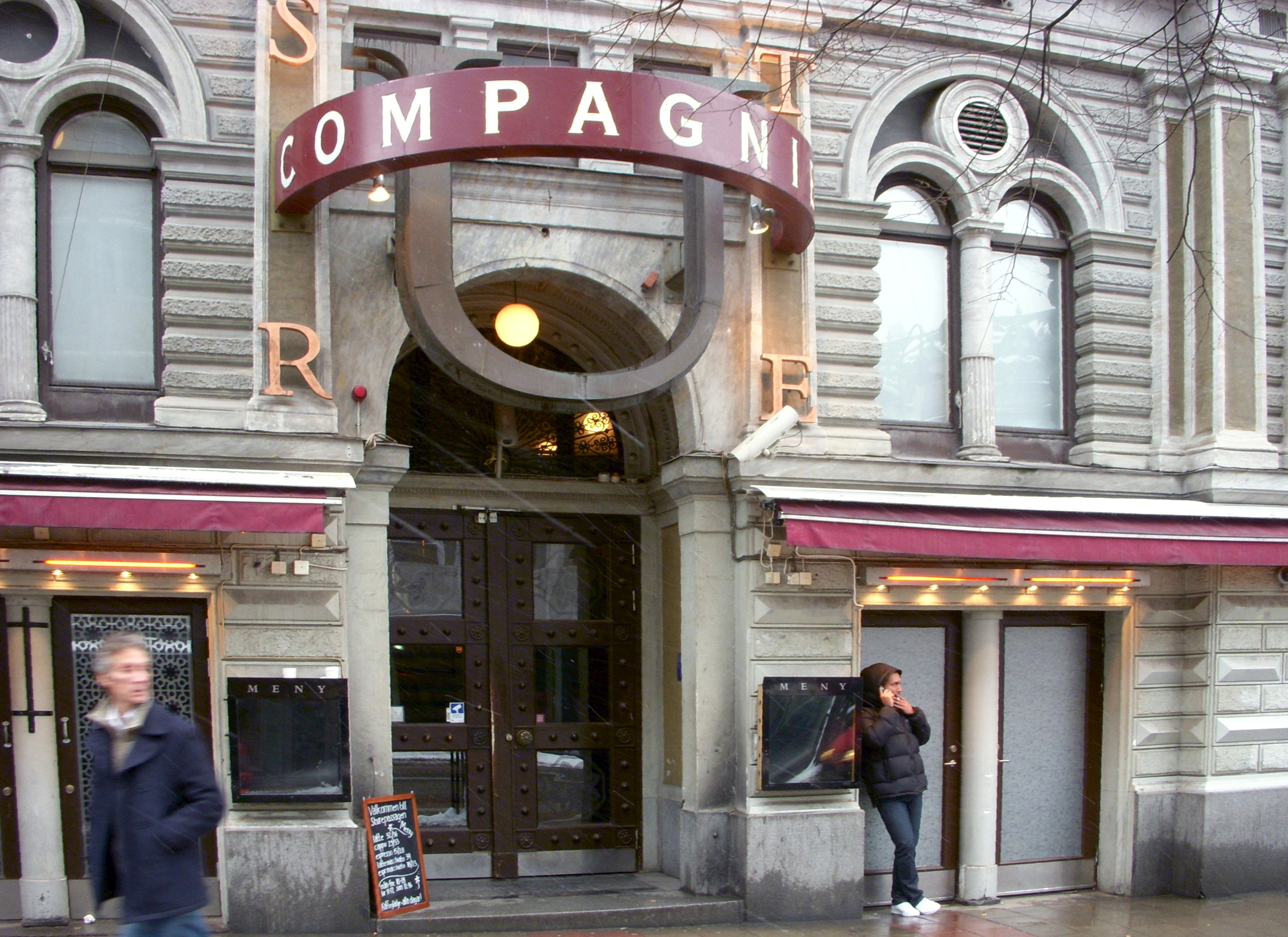
Sturecompagniet in March 2009

Sturecompagniet is one of Sweden's biggest and most known nightclubs and is located at the old Sturebadets 1800-locals at Sturegatan 4 at Stureplan in Stockholm. Close to Sturecompagniet lies nightclubs Hell's Kitchen and IV. Sturecompagniet was in 1994 the scene of the notorious mass murder perpetrated by Tommy Zethraeus.
