= Life imprisonment in Sweden =

Life imprisonment in Sweden is a term of imprisonment for an indeterminate length. It is the most severe punishment available in Sweden. Swedish law states that the longest punishment, other than life imprisonment, is a fixed prison term of 18 years. However, a prisoner convicted to life imprisonment may appeal a partially served life sentence to the District Court of Örebro for "fixing" the sentence. Upon success, the sentence is commuted to a fixed sentence of any number of years considered proportionate to the severity of the crime, after which standard Swedish parole regulations apply. Due to new legislation taking effect in January 2022, any offender aged 18 at the commission of the murder can be sentenced to life imprisonment. Previously, an age limit of 21 applied. Prior to 2006, all life sentences were issued without the possibility of parole, although executive clemency was widely issued to commute life sentences to fixed-time sentences in a similar way now exercised by the judiciary. This procedure is the only way a sentence longer than 18 years may be issued in Sweden.

== Records and statistics ==
In October 2015, 142 inmates served life sentences in Sweden, all excluding one were convicted of murder (including accessory, attempt and incitement to murder). One was convicted of genocide (Stanislas Mbanenande, convicted for the role he played in the Rwandan genocide). Seven of those who served life sentences were females.

In October 2022, 189 inmates served life sentences in Sweden, 10 of which were females. The vast majority were convicted for murder, some for accessory or conspiracy to commit murder, and a few for genocide (e.g. Claver Berinkindi, found guilty for participation in the Rwandan genocide in 1994) or attempted murder (e.g. the would-be killer of Obidkhon Sobitkhony).

=== Longest-serving inmates ===
In 2006, convicted murderer Leif Peters died in psychiatric care after 39 years of confinement. As of 2011, Leif Axmyr, who, in 1982, killed his former girlfriend Ulla-Britt Jacobsson and her new fiancée Tommy Larsson, has spent nearly three decades in prison. He held the longest record of ongoing confinement, during which Axmyr filed eleven appeals for a commutation of the sentence. In 2010 his imprisonment was overturned in favor of a determinate sentence of 46 years, but this appeal was itself overturned and a further appeal to the Supreme Court of Sweden was denied. In 2016, Axmyr was finally released after having his sentence converted to 51 years imprisonment, meaning he could leave on probation after 34 years inside (two thirds of the sentence). In 2022, Axmyr was surpassed by spree killer Tommy Alexandersson, sentenced for a case of both triple and double murder in 1988. There have been psychiatric inmates effectively imprisoned for longer periods than Axmyr and Alexandersson.

== Commutation ==
Increased criticism from prison authorities, prisoners and victims led to a revision of practices and in 2006, a new law was passed which gave prisoners the right to apply to have a sentence commuted to a determined sentence at the Örebro District Court. A prisoner must serve at least 10 years in prison before applying and the set sentence cannot be under 18 years (with 1/3 of the sentence suspended), the longest determined sentence allowed under Swedish law.

When granting a determinate sentence, the court takes into account the crime, the prisoner's behaviour in prison, public safety and the chance of rehabilitation. However, some prisoners may never be released, considered too dangerous to the public. Of those who have been given set sentences under the new law, the sentences have ranged between 25 and 31 years. In 2007, the Swedish Supreme Court ruled that ten years in prison (which at that time was the harshest available prison sentence other than life imprisonment) should overrule life imprisonment as the "general option" for premeditated murder. This was later revised by a number of statutes, specifying a number of conditions for which a life sentence should be issued.

In 2009, judicial discretion and options to sentence people to more than 10 years but less than life became available. Under the new law, anyone convicted of murder will be sentenced to 10 to 18 years' imprisonment or a life sentence in special circumstances. On average, when there are no special circumstances, a sentence of 14 years may be imposed. In mitigating circumstances, the possible sentence ranges from 10-13 years. In aggravating circumstances, the possible sentence is 15-18 years or life. The "average" sentence of murder, forming a starting point, is considered at 16 years' imprisonment by precedent, with a higher or lower sentence requiring aggravating or mitigating circumstances.

In 2020, a new law was passed that increased the likelihood of a person convicted of murder receiving a life sentence. Previously, only 30 % of murder cases with aggravating circumstances resulted in life imprisonment; this new legislation resulted in an increase of 50 % of life sentences imposed the previous year.

In January 2022, the minimum age for someone to be sentenced to lifetime was reduced from 21 to 18, although particularly aggravating factors must be considered; i.e. cases which would result in a life sentence for a person over 21 may still result in a fixed sentence for a younger person. The first 18-19-year-old to be given life imprisonment was Fabian Vidar Cederholm (born 23 December 2003), who at age 18 committed a double axe murder at his school in March 2022. The sentence was the harshest imposed on a teenager for a long time.

== Aggravated murder eligible for life imprisonment ==
According to current law, a life sentence may be imposed for murder if "the act was preceded by careful planning, was characterised by particular cunning, aimed to promote or conceal other offences, involved severe suffering for the victim or was otherwise particularly ruthless." (Chapter 3, Section 1 of the Swedish Criminal Code).

== Examples ==
- Jackie Arklöv – Murderer and also convicted of crimes against humanity
- John Ausonius – Murderer and attempted serial killer
- Stig Bergling – Convicted of espionage
- Fabian Cederholm - School stabber and murderer
- Anders Eklund – Murderer and rapist
- Mattias Flink – Mass murderer
- Carina Frödin - Arson murderer
- Maria Kisch - Murderer
- Martina Kveldstad - Murderer
- Peter Mangs – Murderer and attempted serial killer
- Mijailo Mijailović – Convicted of the murder of Anna Lindh
- Johanna Möller - Found guilty of murdering her father, and the attempted murder of her mother.
- Hamid Nouri - Foreign official convicted of mass murder
- Jennie Olsson - Murderer
- Stig Wennerström – Convicted of treason
- Tommy Zethraeus – Mass murderer
