= Tommy Zethraeus =

Swedish mass murderer (born 1969)

- Born: Tommy Pedro Garcia Belmonte; 28 May 1969 (age 57); Botkyrka, Sweden
- Other names: Tommy Eriksson, Tommy Belmonte
- Convictions: Murder (4 counts); Attempted murder
- Penalty: Life imprisonment
- Capture status: Paroled in December 2020
- Accomplices: Guillermo Márquez Jara; Farshad Doosti

Details
- Date: 4 December 1994
- Country: Sweden
- Locations: Sturecompagniet, Stockholm
- Killed: 4
- Injured: 20
- Weapon: AG-3 battle rifle

Tommy Pedro Garcia Belmonte (born 28 May 1969), now Tommy Eriksson, commonly known as Tommy Zethraeus, is a Swedish mass murderer responsible for the murder of four people outside the restaurant Sturecompagniet at Stureplan, Stockholm on 4 December 1994. After Zethraeus and two of his friends were denied entry at the door to the restaurant, they went home by taxi and returned at about five in the morning. Zethraeus had brought with him a fully automatic Norwegian AG-3 battle rifle and gunned down three women, Katinka Genberg (21), Daniella Josberg (22) and Kristina Oséen (21), and doorman Joakim Jonsson (22). Over twenty other people were injured.

He was tried and later sentenced to life imprisonment. Zethraeus applied in 2009 to seek a time frame set for his life sentence, but his application was denied by the court. However, on 11 February 2014, an Örebro court decided to grant Zethraeus his application setting a conditional parole in 2016. The Örebro District Court's decision was appealed to the Court of Appeal, where it was repealed.

In 2016, Zethraeus applied again for a determinate sentence. The Örebro District Court granted his application, but the decision was appealed. On 26 August 2016, the Göta Court of Appeal denied his application, citing that it was too early to set a determinate sentence because the risk of recidivism in serious crime was too high. He was released from prison in December 2020. after an appeal fixed the sentence to 39 years, or 26 years plus 13 years' parole. He was soon re-arrested and in 2022 sentenced to 18 months' imprisonment on a count of aggravated drug trafficking for assisting the importation of severe amounts of cocaine. In addition to the new sentence, his parole was revoked and he will serve a minimum of three years before eligible again.
