= Swedish National Board of Forensic Medicine =

- Rättsmedicinalverket (RMV)
- The coat of arms of the Swedish National Board of Forensic Medicine

Agency overview
- Formed: 1991
- Jurisdiction: Government of Sweden
- Headquarters: Vasagatan 52; Stockholm
- Employees: 380
- Annual budget: SEK 379M (2014)
- Minister responsible: Gunnar Strömmer, (Ministry of Justice)
- Agency executive: Lars Werkström, (Director-General)
- Parent agency: Ministry of Justice
- Key document: Regleringsbrev
- Website: www.rmv.se

The Swedish National Board of Forensic Medicine (Swedish: Rättsmedicinalverket, abbreviated RMV) is a Swedish government agency organized under the Ministry of Justice, responsible for forensic psychiatry, forensic chemistry, forensic medicine and forensic genetics. The agency headquarters responsible for coordination, planning, regulation and control is located in Stockholm; overseeing a number of forensic departments in Gothenburg, Uppsala, Umeå, Lund and Linköping.

== See also ==
- Ministry of Justice (Sweden)
- Swedish National Forensic Centre
