= Juha Valjakkala =

Finnish murderer (1965–2023)

- Born: Juha Veikko Valjakkala; 13 June 1965; Pori, Finland
- Died: 27 February 2023 (aged 57)
- Other names: Aslak Valdemar Ahonen; Nikita Joakim Fouganthine
- Spouses: Minna-Maria Huttunen (divorced); Alexandra Fouganthine (m. 2002)
- Partner: Marita Routalammi
- Status: Deceased
- Convictions: Murder (3 counts), escape, theft, parole violation
- Penalty: Life sentence with parole eligibility

Details
- Victims: 3
- Date: 3 July 1988
- Country: Sweden
- States: Åmsele, Västerbotten County
- Weapons: Shotgun; Knife
- Date apprehended: July 1988 (for murders); April 1994; 2002; 2004; 30 November 2006; 25 October 2022 (all escapes)

Nikita Bergenström (formerly Juha Veikko Valjakkala, Aslak Valdemar Ahonen, and Nikita Joakim Fouganthine; 13 June 1965 – 27 February 2023) was a Finnish murderer convicted of the triple murder of a family in the northern Swedish community of Åmsele.

== Åmsele murders ==
Valjakkala was born in Pori. The series of events that led to the murders began when the 22-year-old was released from a prison in Turku on 1 May 1988, after which he started wandering through Sweden and Finland with his 21-year-old then-girlfriend Marita Routalammi.

On 3 July, they arrived in Åmsele. After nightfall Valjakkala stole a bicycle. He was pursued by the owners, Sten Nilsson and his 15-year-old son Fredrik. The chase ended at a cemetery where Sten and Fredrik Nilsson were both shot by Valjakkala with a shotgun. Later Sten's wife and Fredrik's mother, Ewa Nilsson, went looking for the two, was chased into the woods and had her throat slit by Valjakkala outside the cemetery. Valjakkala and Routalammi were caught in Odense, Denmark just over a week later.

At the trial the two defendants blamed each other for the murders, but the court believed Routalammi's story. A psychiatric evaluation found both to be mentally competent for trial. However, the statement by a forensic psychiatrist found that Valjakkala suffered from a psychopathic personality and was very aggressive. Conviction for the murders was his 12th criminal conviction.

== Imprisonment and escape attempts ==
Valjakkala was given a life sentence on three counts of murder, while Routalammi received two years for complicity in assault and battery. Routalammi was released after serving half of her time, and Valjakkala was transferred to Finland to serve out the rest of his sentence.

Valjakkala tried to escape from prison in 1991.

In April 1994, Valjakkala fled the Riihimäki Prison in Finland where he was being held. He took a teacher as a hostage, but he was apprehended nearby and the hostage escaped the situation unscathed.

In 2002, he escaped from Pyhäselkä prison and traveled to Sweden with his wife, and was captured after a large police operation in Långträsk. Upon returning to prison after the 2002 escape he tried to commit suicide by hanging himself in his cell. His next escape in 2004 from Sukeva prison lasted only 19 minutes and reached less than 1 km from the prison walls.

Just after midnight on 28 November 2006 Valjakkala escaped for the fourth time, this time from the labor prison in Hamina. He was captured on the evening of 30 November 2006 by police Readiness Unit Karhuryhmä in Maunula, Helsinki. Police raided the apartment which was suspected to be Valjakkala's hideout. Valjakkala was captured without resistance. After the incident Valjakkala went back to closed prison.

Valjakkala changed his name to Nikita Joakim Fouganthine in 2008 and later to Nikita Bergenström in 2013.

On 25 October 2022, he once again escaped from open prison in Kerava, by not returning from a visit to the doctor. He was arrested by the police the same day.

== Parole ==
Having served 19 years in prison, Fouganthine was due to be released on parole on 1 July 2008.

Fouganthine was released on 25 February 2008. He was arrested again on 12 April 2008 for breaking his release terms by, among other things, endangering the traffic, stealing a vehicle and driving a vehicle without a licence and driving an unlicensed taxi. Valjakkala admitted to the offences.

Fouganthine and his wife Alexandra married in May 2008.

In December 2008, the Supreme Court of Finland decided that he would be released with a suspended sentence in February 2009. Fouganthine was paroled again on 2 February, and said he was writing an autobiography.

On 23 November 2011, he escaped from Kerava's parole prison. On 1 December he was found in Vallila, Helsinki. It is not believed that Fouganthine committed any crimes during his escape.

== Death ==
Bergenström died on 27 February 2023, at the age of 57. The place and cause of his death have not been made public.

== Media ==
In 1991, Swedish director Jan Troell directed a film based on the Åmsele murders, Il Capitano, starring Antti Reini.

Nikita Bergenström is credited as Juha Valjakkala in The Girl Who Played with Fire, in a comparison between criminals' profiles.

The eighteenth episode of the Danish television drama Rejseholdet is based on the Åmsele murders.
