= Murder in Swedish law =

Swedish legal policy

In Sweden, the following homicide offenses exist:

- Murder (Swedish: Mord) is defined as an intentional killing and is punishable with imprisonment between 10 and 18 years or life imprisonment. (3-1 § of the Penal Code)
- Manslaughter (Dråp) (roughly corresponds to voluntary manslaughter). It is defined as murder when it is less severe, either due to the circumstances or the crime itself and is punishable by 6 to 10 years. (3-2 §). The law reads: "If, in view of the circumstances that occasioned the act or for some other reason, an offence referred to in Section 1 is considered less serious, the person is guilty of manslaughter and is sentenced [...]"
- Infanticide (Barnadråp) is murder committed by a mother on her child "when, owing to her confinement, she is in a disturbed mental state or in grave distress", punishable with any prison term up to 6 years. (3-3 §)
- Causing the death of another (Vållande till annans död). It roughly corresponds to negligent homicide or involuntary manslaughter. The law reads: "A person who causes the death of another person through negligence is guilty of causing the death of another and is sentenced [...]" The punishment for Vållande till annans död is:
  1. A fine (day-fines) if the crime is petty,
  2. Any prison term up to 2 years, or
  3. Any prison term between 1 year and 6 years "if the offence is gross".

Any person under 18 (but not under the age of 15) is sentenced as a ratio of what an adult would receive. Furthermore, people under 15 may be convicted of crimes, but not subject to legal punishment.

== Murder ==
The most serious offense of intentional homicide in Sweden in murder (Mord). Its understanding and punishment have evolved over the time. Currently the law reads:

Section 1

A person who takes the life of another person is guilty of murder and is sentenced to imprisonment for a fixed term of at least ten and at most eighteen years, or for life. As grounds for life imprisonment, particular consideration is given to whether the act was preceded by careful planning, was characterised by particular cunning, aimed to promote or conceal other offences, involved severe suffering for the victim or was otherwise particularly ruthless.

In Sweden, the maximum punishment for any offense is life imprisonment (see Life imprisonment in Sweden), which is available as a punishment for the most aggravated forms of murder. Capital punishment in Sweden was abolished for all crimes committed during peacetime on 30 June 1921 and for all crimes, including those committed in time of war, on 1 January 1973. The last person executed in Sweden was Johan Alfred Ander, who was executed for a murder during the course of a robbery in 1910.

== See also ==
- List of murder laws by country
