= List of mass shootings in Sweden =

This article is a list of mass shootings in Sweden. Mass shootings are firearm-related violence with at least four casualties.

== 21st century ==
Date	Location	Dead	Injured	Total	Description
4 October 2025	Gävle, Gävleborg County	0	6	6	A 13-year-old shot six people on a street, including children. The shooter was arrested.
4 February 2025	Örebro, Örebro County	11 (Note: Including the perpetrator or suspect)	6	17	Örebro school shooting: A former student opened fire with multiple weapons at Campus Risbergska, killing ten people and wounding six others. The shooter killed himself.
21 September 2023	Sandviken, Gävleborg County	2	2	4	A shooting at a pub left the target and a bystander dead and two other bystanders wounded.
10 June 2023	Stockholm, Stockholm County	2	2	4	Two shooters fired an automatic rifle at two 15-year-olds outside Farsta metro station. Both boys were shot, one fatally. A bystander was fatally shot and another wounded by stray gunfire.
3 March 2023	Malmö, Skåne County	0	4	4	A shooter on an electric scooter opened fire outside a grocery store, wounding four teenagers. An 18-year-old was arrested in April 2023 for the shooting.
23 January 2019	Umeå, Västerbotten County	1	3	4	A 19-year-old male was killed and three other people wounded in Ersboda.
3 November 2018	Mölnlycke, Västra Götaland County	0	6	6	Eight people were wounded, six by gunfire, at a party venue. The victims were Hells Angels.
18 June 2018	Malmö, Skåne County	3	3	6	A shooting at a café left three men dead and three other people wounded.
7 June 2018	Stockholm, Stockholm County	0	4	4	Police discovered three people wounded in Tensta, as well as a passerby who was struck by a ricochet.
25 September 2016	Malmö, Skåne County	1	3	4	Two shooters fired into a car from mopeds, killing a man and wounding three others.
30 August 2015	Stockholm, Stockholm County	1	5	6	Two brothers shot and stabbed a man to death in Rinkeby. Five bystanders were struck by stray bullets and injured.
13 June 2015	Malmö, Skane County	0	4	4	Four men were shot in the street, three of whom were severely injured.
18 March 2015	Gothenburg, Västra Götaland County	2	8	10	Gothenburg pub shooting: Two gunmen opened fire inside a pub, killing two people and wounding eight others. Several people were convicted for their roles in the gang-related shooting.
21 April 2014	Norrköping, Östergötland County	2	2	4	A fight in Hageby led to a shooting which injured four people, two of whom died from their injuries.
22 April 2011	Gothenburg, Västra Götaland County	0	4	4	Four people were shot and wounded during a brawl outside a café in Hisingen.
15 August 2003	Stockholm, Stockholm County	0	4	4	Multiple shooters fired at the entrance of a nightclub, wounding four people.
21 January 2000	Skoghall, Värmland County	4	0	4	A man shot and killed his ex-wife, their two sons, and himself.

== 20th century ==
Date	Location	Dead	Injured	Total	Description
2 May 1999	Ånäset, Västerbotten County	4	0	4	A man killed his wife and two teenage children with a rifle before killing himself.
28 December 1994	Hässleholm, Skåne County	0	4	4	A gunman wounded four people in an apartment building.
4 December 1994	Stockholm, Stockholm County	4	20	24	Sturecompagniet murders: A man fired an automatic rifle at patrons and employees of the Sturecompagniet restaurant, killing four people and wounding twenty others.
11 June 1994	Falun, Dalarna County	7	4	11	Falun shooting: A Swedish Army officer fired his service rifle at people in a park and at a road crossing, killing seven and wounding three. He was shot in the hip by police and arrested soon after.
13 February 1994	Helsingborg, Skåne County	1	3	4	Members of the Hells Angels and Bandidos motorcycle clubs fired shots at each other at a nightclub during the Nordic Biker War, resulting in one Hells Angel being killed and three other people wounded.
17 June 1993	Stenkumla, Gotland County	2	2	4	A man wounded his estranged partner and her father with a shotgun and killed her father's partner before he killed himself.
6 December 1992	Mora, Dalarna County	1	5	6	A man had a verbal altercation with a group of youths and went to his apartment; he returned with a pistol and shot six members of the group, one fatally.
14 November 1992	Meselefors, Västerbotten County	4	0	4	A man shot and killed his wife, two children and himself.
6 April 1988	Gävle, Gävleborg County	1	3	4	A man opened fire inside a county administration building over a failed adoption case, killing a worker and wounding two others. He went home and engaged in a standoff with police, wounding one officer before surrendering.
17 June 1984	Gällivare, Norrbotten County	1	3	4	A man shot at people and buildings for around an hour. A police officer was killed and two civilian women wounded before the shooter was wounded by another officer and arrested.
8 September 1980	Brandbergen, Stockholm County	4	0	4	Brandbergen murders: A man raped a woman after a drinking party, his gun accidentally discharged and killed her. He then killed the three other men in the apartment by shooting them and cutting their throats.
4 April 1980	Järfälla, Stockholm County	5 (Note: Four by firearm)	1	6	A man stabbed his wife to death and then shot and killed three of his children and wounded a fourth. The man shot himself after the killings.
28 November 1979	Saltsjö-Boo, Stockholm County	5	0	5	A man shot and killed his wife and three children before killing himself.
1 February 1976	Gothenburg, Västra Götaland County	2	5	7	An upset soldier shot seven people with his service weapon at a discotheque, killing two.
24 December 1975	Vattnäs, Dalarna County	3	1	4	The military officer Sten Fransson killed his fiance and her parents and wounded her daughter. He was arrested at the scene.
22 June 1971	Listerby, Blekinge County	5	0	5	A man armed with a revolver killed his wife and three children before killing himself.
1 March 1971	Söderhamn, Gävleborg County	4	0	4	1971 Söderhamn courthouse murders: A criminal defendant killed his ex-fiancée, her lawyer, his own lawyer, and a lawspeaker.
29 April 1970	Skutskär, Uppsala County	4	1	5	A man killed three of his children and wounded a fourth before killing himself.
5 April 1970	Uppsala, Uppsala County	1	4	5	A man randomly shot into a crowd outside a restaurant with a submachine gun, wounding five people, one of whom later died.
4 March 1961	Kungälv, Västra Götaland County	1	6	7	Kungälv school shooting: A 17-year-old student opened fire at a school dance, wounding seven people, one of whom died of his wounds. The shooter was arrested soon after.
9 March 1958	Håljaryd, Jönköping County	4	0	4	A man armed with a shotgun killed his wife, two children and himself.
19 August 1957	Bålsta & Djursholm, Uppsala County & Stockholm County	3	1	4	A man armed with a handgun shot at a couple in Bålsta, killing the man and wounding the woman. The perpetrator then travelled to Djursholm where he shot and killed a man. Police found the suspect dead in Lidingö.
10 January 1956	Fjugesta, Örebro County	4	0	4	A man shot and killed his wife, two sons and himself.
2 January 1956	Sorunda, Stockholm County	4	0	4	1956 Sorunda familicide: A man shot and killed his wife, two children and himself.
14 December 1950	Solberga, Västra Götaland County	3	1+	4+	A man armed with a rifle shot randomly at buildings, cars and people. He killed three people and possibly wounded several others during his shooting spree. The man attempted to kill himself but survived.
8 March 1946	Falun, Dalarna County	3	1	4	A man opened fire inside a cafe killing his wife and sister-in-law. Another customer was wounded. The man shot himself and died in hospital.
3 March 1945	Malmö, Skåne County	3	2	5	A man shot four of his relatives, killing two. He escaped the scene and fatally shot himself.
12 August 1943	Umeå, Västerbotten County	4	0	4	A man armed with a handgun shot and killed his wife and two children before killing himself.
26 February 1942	Härslöv, Skåne County	4	0	4	A man shot and killed his wife and three children before being arrested.
16 March 1936	Nyköping, Södermanland County	3	2	5	A man opened fire at the city hall, killing two people and wounding two others before killing himself.
14 May 1931	Ådalen, Västernorrland County	5	5	10	Ådalen shootings: Soldiers fired on strikers protesting pay reductions, killing five strikers and wounding five others.
1 June 1920	Löddeköpinge, Skåne County	6	0	6	A man shot and killed his wife and four children before killing himself.
4 March 1916	Södermalm, Stockholm County	4	0	4	A man shot and killed three people at his former workplace before killing himself.
17 May 1900	Lake Mälaren, Södermanland County	5 (Note: At least two were stabbed)	8	13	Prins Carl massacre: A man killed five people and wounded eight others on board of steam boat ferry Prins Carl.

== 19th century ==
Date	Location	Dead	Injured	Total	Description
15 June 1811	Klågerup, Skåne County	30+	60+	90+	Klågerup riot: Swedish military regiment opened fire on people who refused to conscript.

== See also ==
- List of shootings in Sweden
