= List of school attacks in Sweden =

This is a chronological list of school attacks that have occurred in Sweden. Attacks such as shootings, stabbings and similar attacks on educational institutions are included in the list. The term attacks excludes cases that were suicides involving one or more people, criminal disputes and police actions in Sweden.

== List ==
Date	Location	Perpetrator(s)	Dead	Injured	Description
4 March 1961	Kungälv	Ove Conry Andersson	1	6	Kungälv school shooting: A 17-year-old gunman opened fire on students at a gymnasium, injuring seven people, one of whom, an 18-year-old boy, later died from his injuries, mainly from a stomach injury, before the gunman fled and turned himself in at the police station the following morning.
18 January 2001	Stockholm	Unnamed	1	0	A 16-year-old student at Bromma High School was shot dead in the school bathroom. The shooter fled after the shooting but was quickly arrested. A 19-year-old suspect was detained.
25 October 2001	Medelpad	Unnamed	1	1	A man in his 20s armed with a knife broke into a classroom at Västermalm School at around 1pm and stabbed and seriously injured a man and a woman, also in their 20s. The woman died in hospital.
9 December 2003	Uppsala	Unnamed	0	1	A 21-year-old student attacked a 17-year-old classmate with a knife in the parking lot of a school in Uppsala, causing injuries to the victim, including one to the lung.
30 November 2011	Vallentuna	Unnamed	0	1	A 20-year-old man stabbed and seriously injured a 17-year-old student at Vallentuna High School around 8:30 a.m.
22 October 2015	Trollhättan	Anton Niclas Lundin Pettersson	4 (including the perpetrator)	2	2015 Trollhättan school attack: A 21-year-old man armed with a sword and a knife attacked two staff members and three students, killing three of the victims, before the man was fatally shot by police. His attack was motivated by xenophobia.
11 January 2016	Broby	Unnamed	1	0	A 15-year-old student identified as Arminas Pileckas was stabbed to death in the heart by a 14-year-old classmate who used a kitchen knife to attack him during lunch.
13 December 2017	Stockholm	Unnamed	1	0	A 17-year-old boy stabbed a fellow student identified as Mahmoud Alizade at a school in Enskede before the suspect fled and was later arrested. Alizade later died from his serious injuries.
28 January 2021	Varberg	Unnamed	0	1	A 25-year-old man has been arrested in connection with injuring a student in the hand with an axe and knife.
19 August 2021	Eslöv	Unnamed	0	1	2021 Eslöv school stabbing: A 15-year-old student armed himself with four knives and an airsoft gun and entered a classroom, where he stabbed a 45-year-old teacher in the stomach, before the suspect attempted suicide in front of police but was handcuffed and arrested.
10 January 2022	Kristianstad	Unnamed	0	2	A 16-year-old student armed with four knives went into a secondary school classroom and stabbed a student and a teacher before disarming himself and calling the authorities; he was arrested without resistance.
21 March 2022	Malmö	Fabian Vidar Cederholm	2	0	2022 Malmö school stabbing: At 5:50 p.m., an 18-year-old man attacked two female teachers with a knife and an axe, killing them instantly before the suspect surrendered when authorities arrived at the crime scene.
11 May 2023	Göteborg	Unnamed	0	0	A 15-year-old boy had planned a school attack in Ale Municipality, Gothenburg, but was stopped in time. He was sentenced to ten months of juvenile supervision for preparing murder and possessing explosives, and had to pay damages to a targeted student. Police found knives, a bulletproof vest, gunpowder, and a list of potential victims. The boy was in contact with both the Kristianstad and Eslöv attackers.
4 September 2024	Stockholm	Unnamed	0	1	2024 Trångsund school shooting: A 14-year-old student was shot in the head by a 15-year-old classmate inside a school toilet at Trångsundsskolan. The victim survived with serious injuries. The perpetrator was arrested the same day and later sentenced to two years and two months of closed youth care for attempted murder, gross weapons offences, and conspiracy to commit murder.
4 February 2025	Örebro	Rickard Andersson	11 (including the perpetrator)	12 (6 wounded by gunshots)	Örebro school shooting: A 35-year-old man armed with multiple firearms killed seven women and three men aged 28 to 68 at the Risbergska Campus before the suspect killed himself. Six other victims were shot and survived, while six policemen were injured from smoke inhalation after the shooter detonated a smoke bomb. The Risbergska Campus attack became Sweden's deadliest school shooting and attack, surpassing the Trollhättan school attack.
21 August 2026	Fagersta	18-year-old male	1	3	2026 Fagersta school attack: One person was killed and three others were wounded in a stabbing attack at Brinellskolan in Fagersta.

== See also ==
- List of shootings in Sweden
