= Örebro school shooting =

School shooting in Örebro, Sweden

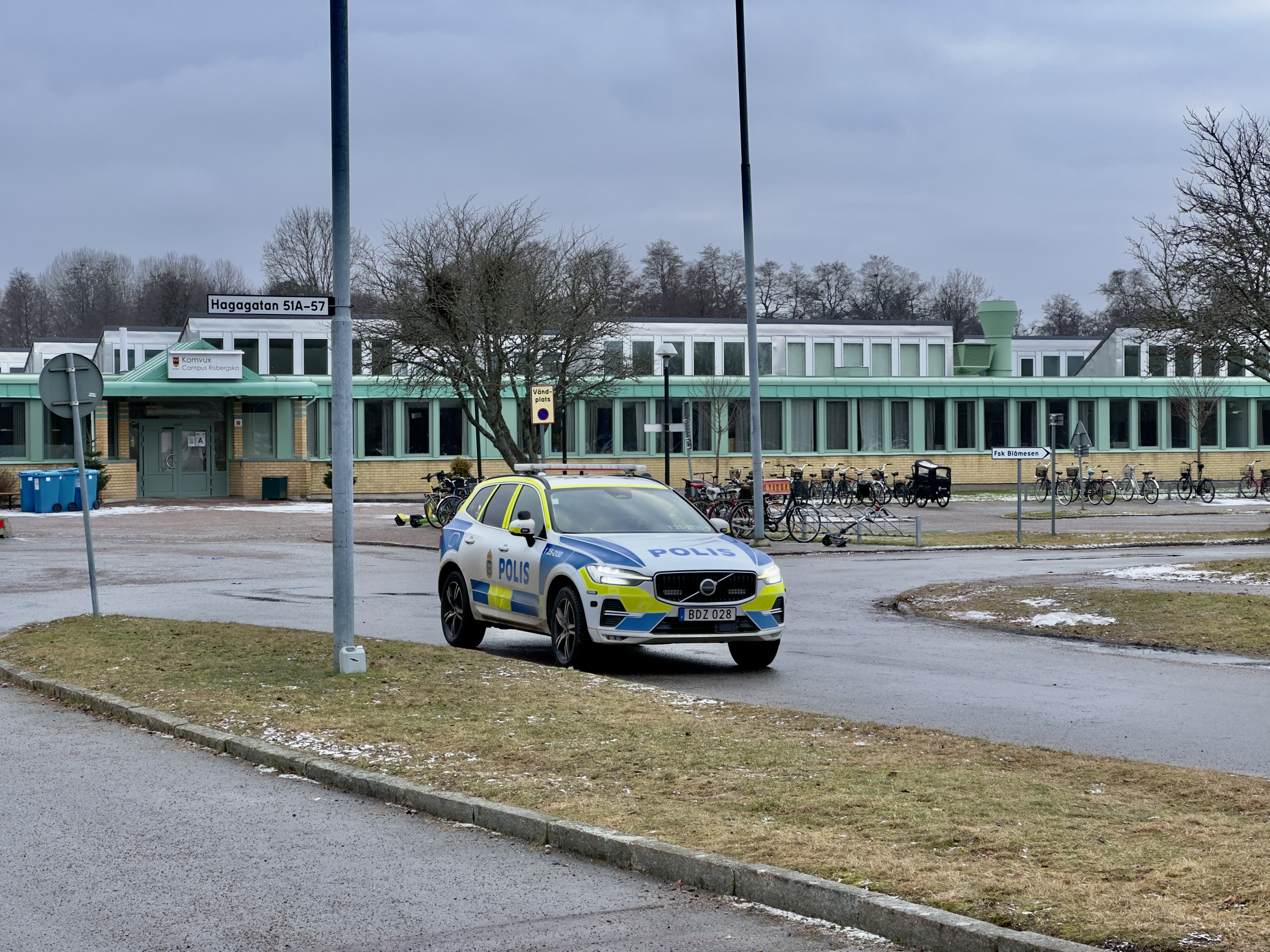
- A police car at Campus Risbergska, five days after the shooting
- Native name: Skolskjutningen i Örebro
- Location: 59°16′10″N 15°9′58″E; Örebro, Sweden
- Date: 4 February 2025; 21 months ago 12:31 – 13:30 (UTC+01:00)
- Target: Students and staff members at Campus Risbergska
- Attack type: School shooting, mass shooting, mass murder, murder–suicide
- Weapons: .30-06 Springfield Browning BAR semi-automatic rifle; 12-gauge Mossberg 590A1 pump-action shotgun; .22 LR Ruger 10/22 semi-automatic rifle (unused); Bowie knife (used in suicide); Smoke grenades
- Deaths: 11 (including the perpetrator)
- Injuries: 12 (5 by gunfire, 7 by smoke inhalation)
- Perpetrator: Rickard Andersson
- Motive: Suicidal ideation; Frustrations over being repeatedly denied health care service benefits; Resentment towards the school

On 4 February 2025, a school shooting occurred at Campus Risbergska, an adult education center in Örebro, Sweden. The shooter was identified as 35-year-old Rickard Andersson, who killed ten people and wounded six others before committing suicide. As of May 2025, the Swedish Police Authority appeared to close their investigation, stating the perpetrator likely targeted Campus Risbergska because he was previously enrolled there for some time, and that his attack was primarily motivated by suicidal thoughts. The incident is the deadliest mass shooting in Swedish history, surpassing a 1994 spree shooting in Falun.

== Background ==
Campus Risbergska is located in Örebro in central Sweden, and shares a campus with several other educational institutions. It occupies the premises of a former girls' school called Risbergska Gymnasium, which operated from 1863 to 2016, as well as a high school for students with disabilities. The present-day Campus Risbergska, which opened in 2017, is known as a komvux, a type of adult education centre in Sweden for people who have not completed primary or secondary school. At the time of the shooting, around 2,000 adult students were enrolled at the school. Notably, the school offers Swedish for immigrants courses, meaning a number of students and staff members were immigrants.

School shootings are uncommon in Sweden. The previous deadliest occurred in Kungälv in 1961. In 2024, a student was shot in the head in the Trångsund school in Stockholm.

== Timeline ==
The perpetrator, Rickard Andersson, travelled to Campus Risbergska and arrived by bus at 07:45 CET, five hours before perpetrating the attack. Aftonbladet reported that the weapons were transported into the school inside a guitar case and in two bags. After arriving at the school, Andersson walked to a lavatory and started preparing for the shooting. He would stay in the lavatory for more than an hour, during which he changed into "military-style attire" consisting of a dark green T-shirt, cammoflauge trousers, combat boots, a knife sheath, and several pouches containing ammunition. He also removed items from his bags and guitar case, prepared his weapons (a Browning BAR rifle, a Mossberg 590A1 shotgun, and a Ruger 10/22 rifle), and took a mixture of amphetamine and caffeine.

At 12:31, Andersson exited the lavatory with his three guns, carrying the .30-06 Springfield Browning BAR in his hands. Upon exiting the lavatory, Andersson came across a student and shot the student at close range. He then went to an adjacent classroom and fired at the occupants inside as they tried running out the opposite door, fatally shooting six people and wounding a seventh.

After firing into the classroom, Andersson turned towards a corridor and fired at one of the exits. Around the same time, a person outside the school began filming him through the glass doors. Andersson then turned around and went to the school's main corridor, fatally shooting one person in a doorway leading to the corridor and wounding another in the corridor itself. Andersson moved north towards a classroom and fatally shot another person near an exit. He then set off two smoke grenades, which triggered the school's fire alarm, before proceeding to another corridor where he injured two people. Andersson then killed two more people near another exit — one in a classroom and one in the corridor — and set off a third smoke grenade before walking through the school building on an unknown path.

The perpetrator on his way to the school.

Two teachers at the school told Dagens Nyheter that they heard gunshots coming from a corridor, followed by silence for half an hour, and then more shooting. Maria Pegado, a teacher at the school, recalled escaping with her 15 students after hearing gunfire. Ingela Bäck Gustafsson, the school's principal, was eating when students ran in and told everyone to evacuate; she and others took shelter in the staff room of Myrorna, a nearby second-hand store. Lena Warenmark, another teacher at the school, said that fewer than usual students were in the building at the time of the shooting since many had gone home following a national exam.

Law enforcement was called at around 12:33 and arrived six minutes later. The shooting was still ongoing during this time, and continued while police officers searched the school building. At approximately 12:43, a squad of police officers were shot at by Andersson, who fired multiple rounds down the main corridor. None of the officers fired back at the gunman, who ran down the corridor from them before locking himself inside a classroom. While his exact actions after this point are mostly unknown, the investigation determined that at some point, Andersson separately fired two rounds — one from his shotgun and the other from his rifle — inside the classroom. He then sat against a wall and took out his knife and Browning BAR, stabbed himself in the chest and shot his head. His body was found by officers at 13:30, nearly an hour after the shooting started.

Andersson was determined to have fired 73 shots in total, including his suicide shot. All but one of the shots were fired from his Browning BAR, with the only other shot coming from his Mossberg shotgun. Andersson's third gun, the Ruger 10/22, was never used during the attack. All of his firearms were found near his body, along with ten empty magazines, 100 cartridges, and a large amount of unused ammunition.

=== Immediate response ===
Around 120 police officers were dispatched to the school following the shooting and soon cordoned off the area. Ambulances were sent from the neighbouring counties of Södermanland and Västmanland to assist medical personnel in Örebro, while Värmland sent blood donations. Police in Värmland and Dalarna also provided reinforcements.

The Swedish Police Authority stated that the perpetrator had acted alone and confirmed that he had died in the attack. Örebro police chief Roberto Eid Forest said the shooter appeared to have killed himself. Police also confirmed the use of smoke grenades during the attack. Sveriges Radio, citing initial police investigations, stated that an automatic firearm had been used in the shooting.

== Casualties ==
Deaths by nationality
Nationality	Deaths
Sweden	2
Syria	2
Afghanistan	1
Bosnia and Herzegovina	1
Eritrea	1
Iran	1
Iraq	1
Somalia	1
Total	10

Eleven people, including the perpetrator, died in the attack. The fatalities consisted of seven women and three men, aged between 28 and 68 years old.

Two Bosnian citizens from Tuzla, identified as Selma Hukić and an unnamed janitor, were confirmed to have been shot during the attack; Hukić was killed while the janitor was left injured, but not critically.

Two male Syrian Christian refugees were also confirmed to be among the fatalities. One of them was Salim Iskef, a 28-year-old Assyrian who had fled from ISIS and was part of Örebro's Assyrian community. He was due to get married in the summer and had called his fiancée after the shooting started, asking her to look after his mother. His funeral was held eight days later at a Syriac Orthodox parish.

Other fatalities included two women, an Eritrean and a Kurdish citizen of Iraq (originally from Shaqlawa), who both worked at the school. Elsa Teklay, had immigrated to Sweden from Eritrea in 2015 and was a nursing student at the time. Three other fatalities were identified as citizens of Afghanistan, Iran and Somalia. Ali Mohammed Jafari, a 41-year-old man from Afghanistan, was training to be a janitor at the time of the shooting. Niloofar, the Iranian victim, was 42 years old and a nursing student. Two Swedes were also confirmed to be among the victims, but their identities have not yet been released.

Six people were taken to Örebro University Hospital, with five of them having life-threatening injuries due to gunshot wounds.

== Perpetrator ==
Driver's license photo of Rickard Andersson.

35-year-old Rickard Andersson (born 10 August 1989 as Jonas Rickard Simon) was identified as the shooter the day after the attack; police confirmed that he had acted alone.

Andersson was born in Örebro and lived there his entire life. As a young child, he had a normal upbringing and was described as being happy and having many friends; however, his personality started to change around seventh grade, when he became reclusive and no longer wanted to go to school. He was homeschooled in ninth grade, and in high school, he was put in a special needs class for those with Asperger's syndrome and high-functioning autism. Andersson graduated in 2008 with "incomplete grades". In 2010, he completed a course at a folk high school, and in 2013 he enrolled in a mathematics course at Campus Risbergska, but did not start it immediately. He re-enrolled in the same course in 2019 but dropped out after two years, having failed to complete it.

Apart from a few internships, Andersson appears to have never had a job. Between 2009 and 2015, he received a disability benefit and, until 2022, some other income support. From that date, he lived on funds which had been saved in his name since he was a child. Despite his limited income, he never incurred any debts and always paid his rent ahead of time. He was described as someone who disliked socialising and was bad at communicating. He seemingly had no friends, with the police being unable to find anyone outside of his family who he had regular contact with. Andersson appeared to have taken good care of himself and ate healthily. While he had no prior criminal record, the subsequent investigation into the shooting uncovered several cryptocurrency transactions on a website that exclusively sells narcotics. In a locked wooden chest in his apartment, police found a laptop, a passport, 2,200 kronor in cash, a bank card reader, a wallet, and a toiletry bag.

In 2011, Andersson passed the necessary theory and practical tests to acquire a hunting certification, allowing him to obtain a firearms licence, which he used to buy four firearms: a Browning BAR (.30-06), a Ruger 10/22 (.22 LR), a Mossberg 590A1 (12-gauge) and a Winchester 1300 (12-gauge) and a gun safe. It is unknown why he acquired these weapons; those around Andersson later described this as being out of character for him, as he had never expressed any prior interest in firearms and was never a member of a shooting or hunting club. Before the shooting, Andersson sold or attempted to sell his personal belongings (including the gun safe), researched how to clean firearms, bought ammunition and smoke grenades, and acquired the guitar case he would use to smuggle his weapons into the school.

In September 2026 the police cold case group reopened an investigation into a fatal fire in Brickeberg, Örebro, on 22 August 2005, in which a nearly two-year-old boy died. The fire is suspected to form part of a series of arsons that occurred in 2004 and 2005. Rickard Andersson’s name was listed among those to be checked as a possible lead.

=== Motive ===
On 5 February 2025, the police stated that everything indicated the shooter had "no ideological motive." While lead investigator Anna Bergkvist initially appeared to withdraw the statement the following day, it was eventually confirmed on 16 May that the shooting was not a targeted attack against a person or specific group of people, and that Andersson "methodically fired at everyone he saw". The police noted, however, that the perpetrator's phone and computer hard drives, which could have stored crucial information for the motive of the attack, were missing.

The police's national offender profiling unit later summarised Andersson's motive:

The motive is assessed to be personally linked to a desire to commit suicide. In connection with this, Rickard Andersson chose to communicate his perceived frustration and take out his aggression on the surroundings at a place that held personal value for him. He planned for and acted in a way that shows a clear drive to kill as many people as possible during the act. This, together with the fact that he did not try to hide his identity, suggests that the act itself is a final, misguided communication to the outside world before ending his life.

The police investigation showed that Andersson's expulsion from Campus Risbergska, which led to his student loans being cut off, could have been a trigger for him in seeking revenge on the school before committing suicide. One of the only hints of a motive that Andersson left behind was his old math book, which he had placed in the school bathroom where he was preparing for the attack. Speculation arose that this book was from the same course he had failed, and might be a hint as to why he chose the school as a target. However, other reports claimed that it could have been a simple coincidence, and the reason why Andersson had brought his math book on the day of the attack could not be positively determined.

==== Skepticism ====
Days before the shooting, Andersson had reportedly browsed a far-right website. Swedish celebrity journalist and writer Jan Guillou has argued that the attack was "clearly racially motivated", and that the shooting should be labeled as a terrorist attack.

On 5 February, TV4 published a video clip shared by an individual who hid in one of the lavatories during the shooting. At one point in the video, the words "You need to leave Europe!" can supposedly be heard, followed by a gunshot. This, combined with the fact that most of the victims were non-white immigrants, fueled speculation that the attack was racially motivated. However, the interpretation of the video's audio has been criticised as being misleading by several audio professionals, who have not been able to reach the same conclusion.

In October 2026, relatives of eight of the victims, who had foreign backgrounds, prepared to ask the incoming government to reopen the police investigation. They had earlier written to then Prime Minister Ulf Kristersson without receiving a reply, stating that the original conclusions left them without answers about possible motives. Author and IT analyst Mattias Beijmo released the book R. Massmordet på Risbergska, in which he argued that digital traces left by Rickard Andersson, including encrypted files sent shortly before the attack, a Telegram account, Counter-Strike contacts and use of Veracrypt, had not been fully examined. Beijmo stated that he did not claim to have proved an ideological motive but that the traces pointed in different directions and should have been pursued more thoroughly. He also noted that the police had publicly ruled out ideological motives within days of the shooting, before the investigation was complete.

== Aftermath ==
Nearby schools were put into lockdown, and police instructed the public to stay away. Örebro Municipality provided support following the shootings, setting up a crisis centre at the Haga Church. The Örebro Mosque also stayed open on the evening of 4 February to offer support.

On 5 February, King Carl XVI Gustaf of Sweden and Queen Silvia visited Örebro and laid flowers near the site of the shooting. Crown Princess Victoria and Prince Daniel attended a high mass in honour of the victims, alongside Örebro residents and politicians including Left Party leader Nooshi Dadgostar and Minister of Finance Elisabeth Svantesson.

The National Police Commissioner Petra Lundh stated, "The police have reason to review procedures and guidelines for the handling of weapons licences." On 6 February, Prime Minister Ulf Kristersson invited the leaders of all political parties in the Riksdag to attend a cabinet meeting, where a minute of silence was observed for the victims. The ambassador of Bosnia and Herzegovina to Sweden Bojan Sosic laid flowers outside of the school in honor of the Bosnian victim of the shooting.

On 9 February, the Swedish government announced that a national minute of silence would be observed at 12 p.m. on 11 February, and that flags would be flown at half-mast from 9 a.m. until the end of the minute.

=== Misinformation ===
The shooting initially prompted speculation on social media about the perpetrator's identity, leading to some individuals being wrongfully accused. The police urged the public not to spread misinformation.

Prominent American businessman Elon Musk faced criticism for amplifying a misleading claim that European politicians and mainstream media remained silent about the tragedy, claiming that "no European politician" had mentioned the massacre. Before Musk deleted his post, it was seen 1.2 million times, and Community Notes had corrected his statements. This assertion was later debunked, as numerous European leaders, including European Commission President Ursula von der Leyen, publicly condemned the attack, and major media outlets provided extensive coverage.

=== Police response evaluation ===
After the shooting, police officers who responded to the shooting completed after-action reviews, the results of which found that while the police response was largely successful, there were several issues regarding the conditions of law enforcement personnel on the scene. These included officers being provided insufficient food and water, additional protective equipment being unused due to them being the wrong size, a lack of training for some officers regarding active shooter situations, and the overloading of police communications due to the large number of officers who were using the same channel.

=== Campus Risbergska ===
Following the shooting, Campus Risbergska was closed for over six months, during which students were taught at other locations in Örebro. 20 million kronor was spent on renovating the school, including replacing 200 doors that were broken down by the police and repainting the entire building. Additionally, an electronic tag system was implemented to control access to the school.

== Reactions ==
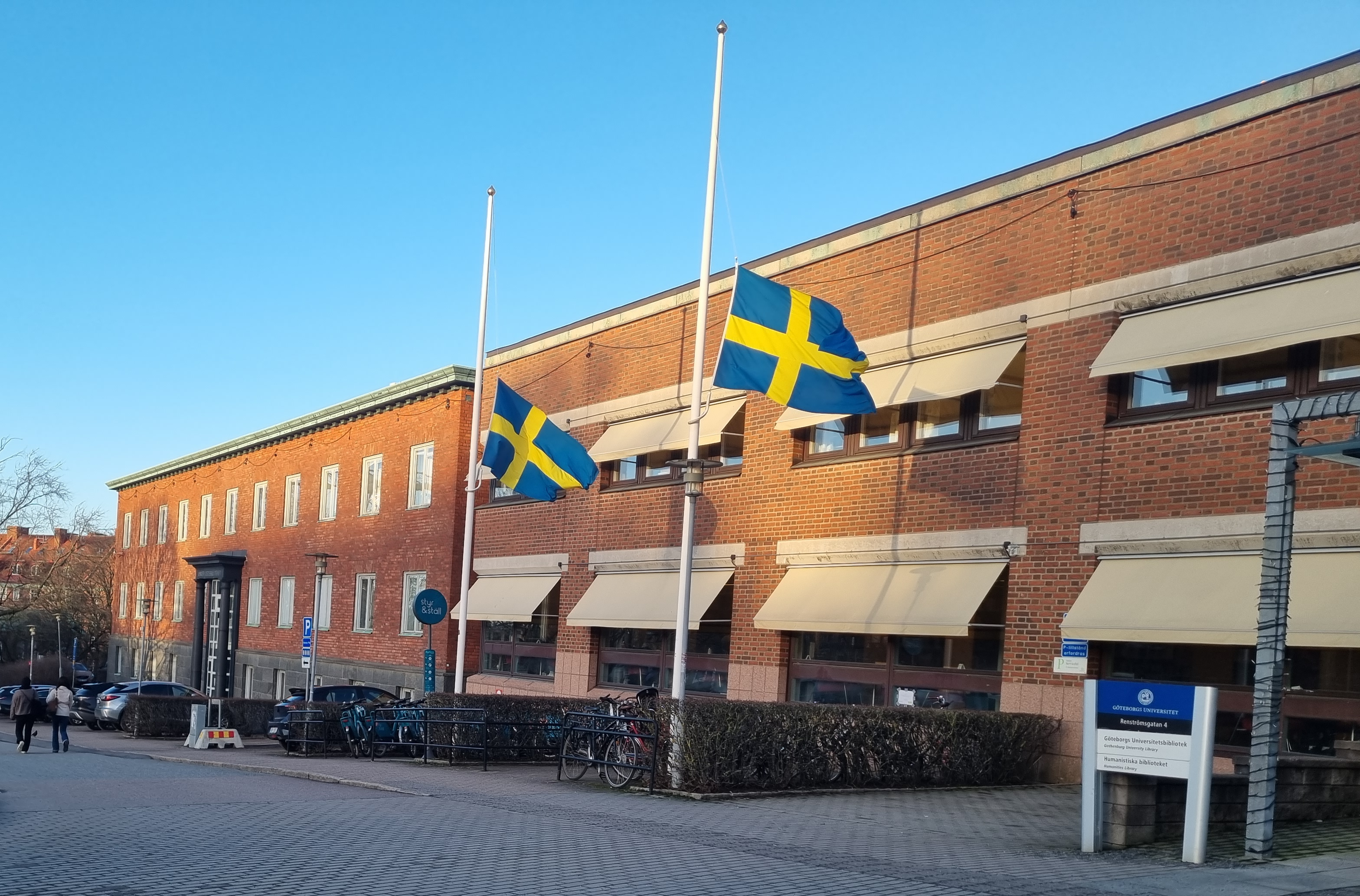
Flags at half-mast in Gothenburg the day after the shooting

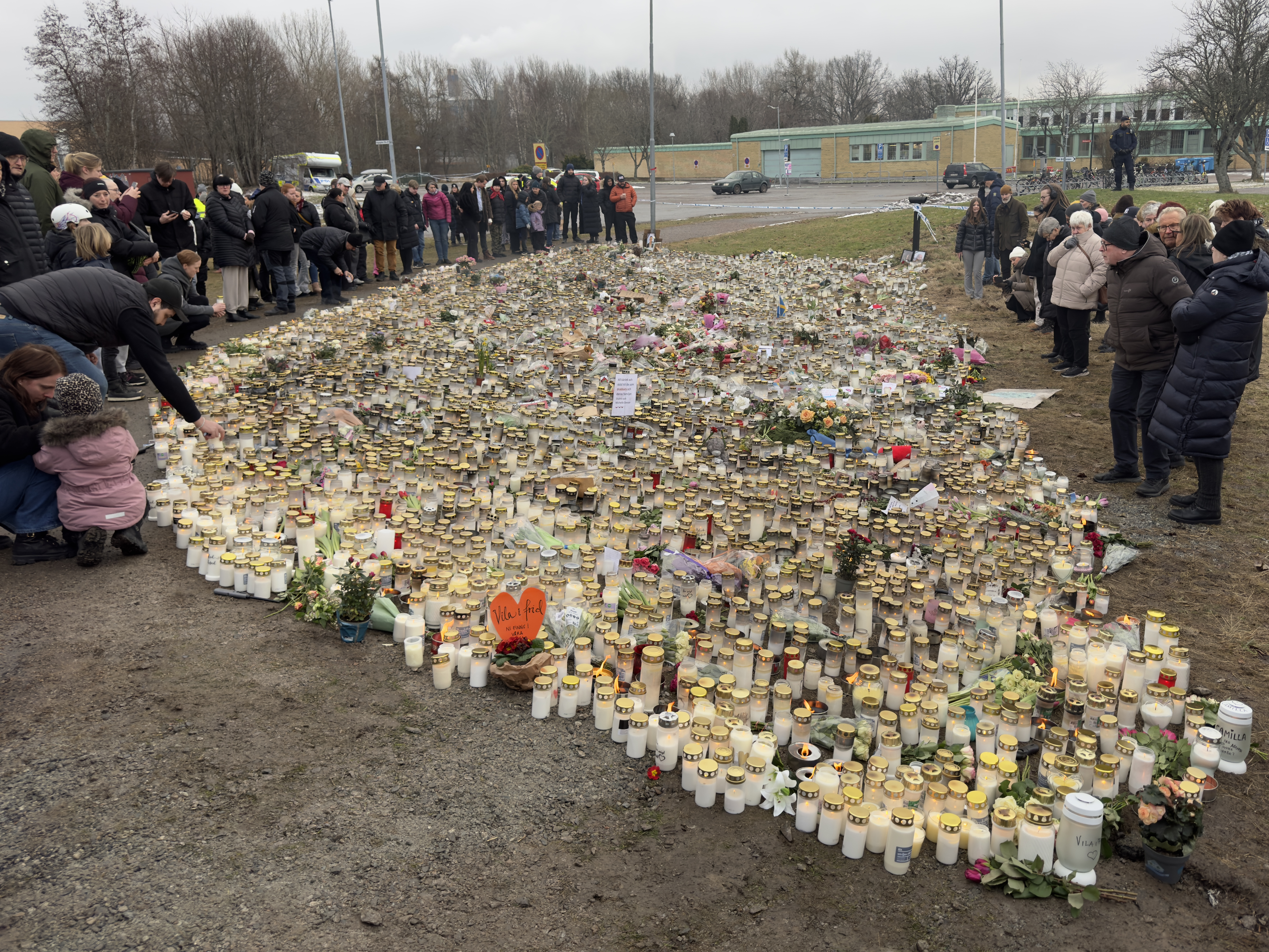
Memorial outside of Campus Risbergska, five days after the shooting

Swedish Prime Minister Ulf Kristersson commented on social media that it is "a very painful day for all of Sweden", and urged an investigation into the shooting. Minister of Justice Gunnar Strömmer called the shooting "one of the worst shootings in Swedish history". King Carl XVI Gustaf sent his condolences, as did local politicians and world leaders including King Frederik X of Denmark, King Harald V of Norway, President Alexander Stubb of Finland, President of the European Commission Ursula von der Leyen and Norwegian Prime Minister Jonas Gahr Støre.

Roberto Eid Forest, head of the local police, described the scene as "awful, exceptional" and "a nightmare". Flags at all government institutions as well as royal palaces were set at half-mast on 5 February. On 6 February the Swedish Football Association said it would begin scheduled international matches with a moment of silence for the victims.

The Danish Ministry of Justice announced that 5 and 6 February, the birthdays of Queen Mary and Princess Marie respectively, would not be observed as flag flying days, out of respect for the victims of the shooting.

On 5 February, the day after the shooting, a memorial service was held at Saint Nicholas Church in Örebro. The King and Queen, the Prime Minister and other government representatives, and several leaders of major political parties attended the ceremony. Also, on the night of 5 February, the Öresund Bridge was illuminated in the colours of the Swedish flag to honour the victims.

On 7 February, the Swedish government unveiled plans to pass stricter regulations on firearms, including restricting access to semi-automatic weapons such as the AR-15.

== See also ==
- 2025 Uppsala shooting, another mass shooting that occurred in April the same year.
- 2015 Trollhättan school attack, the previous deadliest school attack in Sweden 2015.
- Falun mass shooting, the previous deadliest mass shooting in Sweden 1994.
- Kungälv school shooting, the only other mass shooting at a school in Swedish history.
- Trångsund school shooting
- List of attacks related to secondary schools
- List of filmed mass shootings
- List of school attacks in Sweden
- List of shootings in Sweden
- 2025 in Sweden

== Sources ==
In English

- Bryant, Miranda (10 February 2025). "Most victims in Swedish mass shooting had immigrant background, say police". The Guardian.
- Chatterjee, Phelan (5 February 2025). "What do we know about the Sweden school shooter?". BBC.
- Chisholm, Johanna (5 February 2025). "Police say 10 people killed in Sweden school campus shooting". BBC.
- Furtula, Aleksandar; Grits, Sergei; Dazio, Stefanie (7 February 2025a). "Swedish police say mass shooter was connected to school where he opened fire". AP News.
- France24 (6 February 2025a). "Swedish police say 'multiple nationalities' died in mass shooting". France 24.
- France24 (4 February 2025c). "Gunman kills several people at adult education center in Sweden's 'worst mass shooting'". France 24.
- France24 (4 February 2025b). "'Around 10' dead, including gunman, in Sweden's worst mass shooting". France 24.
- Pettersson, Henrik; Haq, Sana Noor (5 February 2025). "Multiple people killed in 'worst mass shooting in Swedish history,' authorities say". CNN.
- TT (8 February 2025a). "The Örebro Shooting – a Timeline". Sweden Herald.

In Swedish

- The Police (5 February 2025a). "04 februari 12.33, Skottlossning, Örebro". polisen.se (in Swedish). Swedish Police Authority. Archived from the original on 5 July 2025.
- Tronarp, Gustaf; Mermer, Menekse (13 February 2025). "Hon stod öga mot öga med mördaren: "Såg ut att njuta av att döda"". Aftonbladet (in Swedish).
- Police (16 May 2025b). "Viljan att ta sitt liv – orsaken till skolattacken på Campus Risbergska". polisen.se (in Swedish). Swedish Police Authority.
- Bolmgren, Filip (16 May 2025a). "Polisen om Rickard Anderssons motiv: "Han ville ta sitt liv"". Expressen (in Swedish).
- SVT (4 February 2025a). "Elva döda i skolskjutning i Örebro". SVT (in Swedish).
- TV4 (5 February 2025). "Ropet innan skotten på skolan: "Ni ska bort från Europa!"". TV4 (in Swedish).
- Sveriges Radio (4 February 2025). "Kristersson: Värsta masskjutningen i svensk historia". Sveriges Radio (in Swedish).
- Hallberg, Ylva; Sirkka, Nadja (4 February 2025). "Skolskjutningen i Örebro: Detta har hänt". Dagens Nyheter (in Swedish).
- Örebro (23 May 2023). "Våra utbildningar". gymnasieskolor.orebro.se (in Swedish).
- Sundkvist, Frida (15 February 2025). "Mördaren kom till skolan – fem timmar före skjutningen". Aftonbladet (in Swedish).
- Bokvist, Pierre; Ejdeholt, Eva (28 May 2025). "Här gömde sig Rickard Andersson". Nerikes Allehanda (in Swedish).
- Sandén, Tilda; Hansson, Oscar; Mohammad, Mohammad (4 February 2025). "Rektorn på Campus Risbergska skolan i Örebro: "Vi sprang för livet"". SVT (in Swedish).
- Israelsson, Linette; Friberg, Anna (6 February 2025). "Polisen tappade bort mördaren under skolskjutningen i Örebro". Expressen (in Swedish).
- Hedlin, Emma (6 February 2025). "Polisen besvarade aldrig beskjutningen: "Måste finnas förutsättningar"". Omni (in Swedish).
- Expressen (16 May 2025a). Polisen visar: Hela filmen från skjutningen i Örebro (Video) (in Swedish). Expressen – via YouTube.
- Anderberg, Cecilia; Malmgren, Kim (7 February 2025). "Här är Rickard Anderssons vapen: Hagelgevär och kulgevär". Expressen (in Swedish).
- Lindström, Albin (15 May 2025). "Polisen sågar TV4:s ljudanalys: "Går inte att urskilja"". Expressen (in Swedish).
- Järkstig, Linnea (8 February 2025). "Expert om ljudinspelningen: "Man hör det man vill höra"". Omni (in Swedish).
- Frick, Hanna (13 February 2025). "Ljudtekniker kritiserar TV4:s publicering: "Oansvarig klickjournalistik"". Dagens Media (in Swedish).
- TT (13 February 2025b). "Kritiserar TV4 för ljudklipp från massmordet". Aftonbladet (in Swedish).
