= List of shootings in Sweden =

This is an incomplete list of shootings in Sweden, ordered from oldest to newest. Seventeen people were killed by firearms in Sweden in 2011, but by 2017, more than 300 shootings had resulted in 41 deaths and more than 100 people injured. By 2022, the number of deaths had risen to 60.

| Date | Location | Dead | Injured | Description |
|---|---|---|---|---|
| 7 March 1932 | Norr Mälarstrand, Stockholm | 4 (Note: Only one of the four murders was committed with a handgun.) | 0 | von Sydow murders: Student Fredrik von Sydow murdered his father, the household's cook, and the housekeeper, shot his fiancée with a revolver later that evening, then committed suicide. |
| 4 March 1961 | Kungälv, Bohuslän | 1 | 7 | Kungälv school shooting: A 17-year-old male shot seven students, killing one, and fled the scene. Later he surrendered to the police and was sentenced to compulsory treatment. |
| 9 January 1967 | Handen, Stockholm | 3 | 0 | Handen murders: 28-year-old Leif Peters shot and killed two police officers and one security guard during a robbery in southern Stockholm. |
| 1 March 1971 | Söderhamn, Gävleborg County | 4 | 0 | 1971 Söderhamn courthouse murders: A criminal defendant killed his ex-fiancée, her lawyer, his own lawyer, and a lawspeaker. |
| 24 December 1975 | Vattnäs, Dalarna | 3 | 1 | 41-year-old military officer Sten Fransson shot his girlfriend, her parents and daughter on Christmas Eve 1975 in Vattnäs, Dalarna. Only the daughter survived. |
| 8 September 1980 | Brandbergen, Stockholm | 4 | 0 | Brandbergen murders: 22-year-old Gunnar Palmroth raped a woman after a drinking party. His gun accidentally discharged and killed her. He then killed the three other men in the apartment by shooting them and cutting their throats. |
| 28 February 1986 | Sveavägen–Tunnelgatan, Stockholm | 1 | 1 | Assassination of Olof Palme: The Prime Minister of Sweden, Olof Palme, was assassinated, and his wife, Lisbeth Palme, was injured. |
| 11 June 1994 | Falun, Dalarna | 7 | 3 | Mass murderer Mattias Flink shot dead seven people. |
| 4 December 1994 | Stureplan, Stockholm | 4 | 20 | Tommy Zethraeus killed three women and a bouncer. They were all shot at the entrance to a restaurant. |
| 23 July 1997 | Ramberget, Gothenburg | 1 | 0 | Keillers Park murder: Josef ben Meddour, aged 36, was murdered in Keillers park. |
| 28 May 1999 | Malexander, Östergötland | 2 | 0 | Malexander murders: Swedish policemen Olov Borén and Robert Karlström were killed by bank robbers. |
| June 2003-October 2010 | Malmö, Scania | 3 | 12 | Between June 2003 and October 2010, serial killer Peter Mangs shot 15 immigrants in Malmö, killing 3 and injuring 12. |
| 10 January 2004 | Knutby, Uppland | 1 | 1 | Knutby murder: Alexandra Fossmo was killed. Her employer, 30-year-old IT entrepreneur Daniel Linde, was shot in the head and chest, but survived. |
| 18 March 2015 | Gothenburg | 2 | 8+ | 2015 Gothenburg pub shooting: A gang-related shooting occurred in which a 25-year-old said to be a leading figure in a local gang and a 20-year-old bystander were killed. |
| 2 August 2020 | Norsborg, Botkyrka | 1 | 0 | Murder of Adriana Naghei Ostrowska: A 12-year-old girl named Adriana was shot dead in an attempted mass shooting. |
| 9 November 2022 | Gävle, Gästrikland | 1 | 0 | The 2022 Sätra shooting involved the fatal shooting of a 24-year-old man with alleged connections to a local criminal network. The victim had previously been accused of narcotics offenses and money laundering. Court concluded, the teenage suspects were believed to have ties to the criminal network known as G15. |
| 21 September 2023 | Sandviken, Gästrikland | 2 | 2 | The 2023 Sandviken Shooting occurred when a man entered a pub and opened fire. Authorities believe the attack was aimed at a specific target. According to SVT news, the incident was linked to an ongoing local gang conflict. |
| 10 April 2024 | Skärholmen, Stockholm | 1 | 0 | Murder of Mikael Janicki: A 39-year-old man named Mikael Janicki was shot dead in a pedestrian tunnel in front of his 12-year-old son after confronting a group of youths in Skärholmen, Stockholm. |
| 28 July 2024 | Gävle, Gästrikland | 1 | 2 | The 2024 Gävle shooting took place at central part of Gävle outside a pub at 3 a.m. The victim who died was a lead figure in a local criminal network; while the shooter didn't know the victim personally it was suggested a mission ordered by a rival local gang. |
| 4 February 2025 | Örebro, Närke | 11 (Note: Including the perpetrator.) | 6 | Örebro school shooting: 35-year-old Rickard Andersson shot and killed 10 students and injured 12 others before committing suicide. |
| 29 April 2025 | Uppsala, Uppland | 3 | 0 | 2025 Uppsala shooting: Three people were killed on the eve of the Walpurgis festival. A 16-year-old male suspect was taken into custody. |
| 25 October 2025 | Gävle, Gästrikland | 1 | 1 | The 2025 Brynäs occurred in Stenebergsparken, where two teenagers were shot. One died from their injuries, while the other survived. Both victims were believed to have connections to the local criminal network G15. |

== See also ==
- List of mass shootings in Sweden
