= Campus Risbergska =

Coordinates: 59.2699°N 15.1665°E

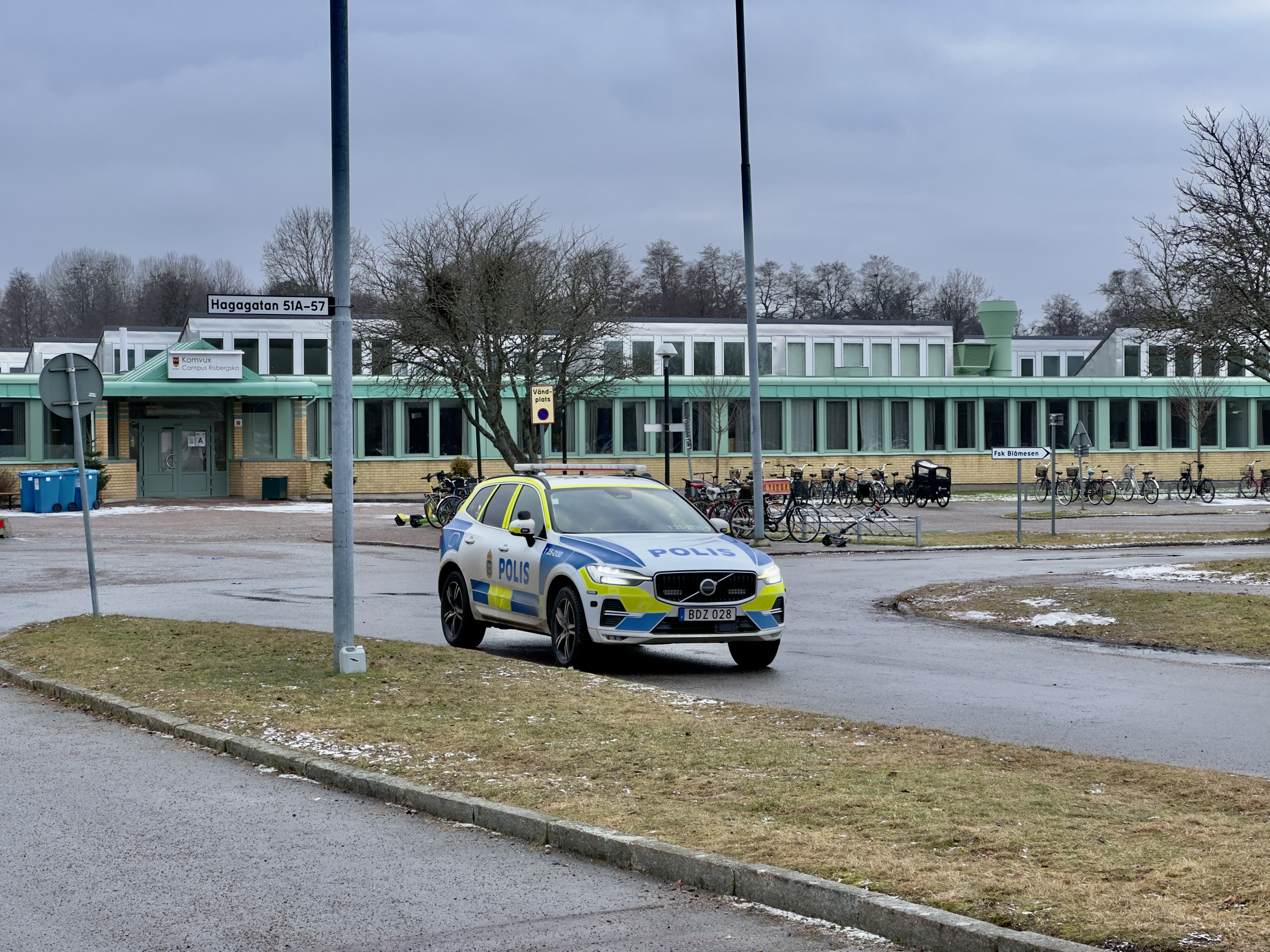
- The school in 2025
- Örebro, Sweden

Information
- Established: 2017

Campus Risbergska is the centre for municipal adult education in Örebro, Sweden. It was inaugurated in 2017. The building it uses previously housed a high school named Risbergska Gymnasium (also called Risbergska School).

After the high school school closed in 2016, the building was renovated and reopened in November 2017 under the current name.

== Risbergska Gymnasium ==
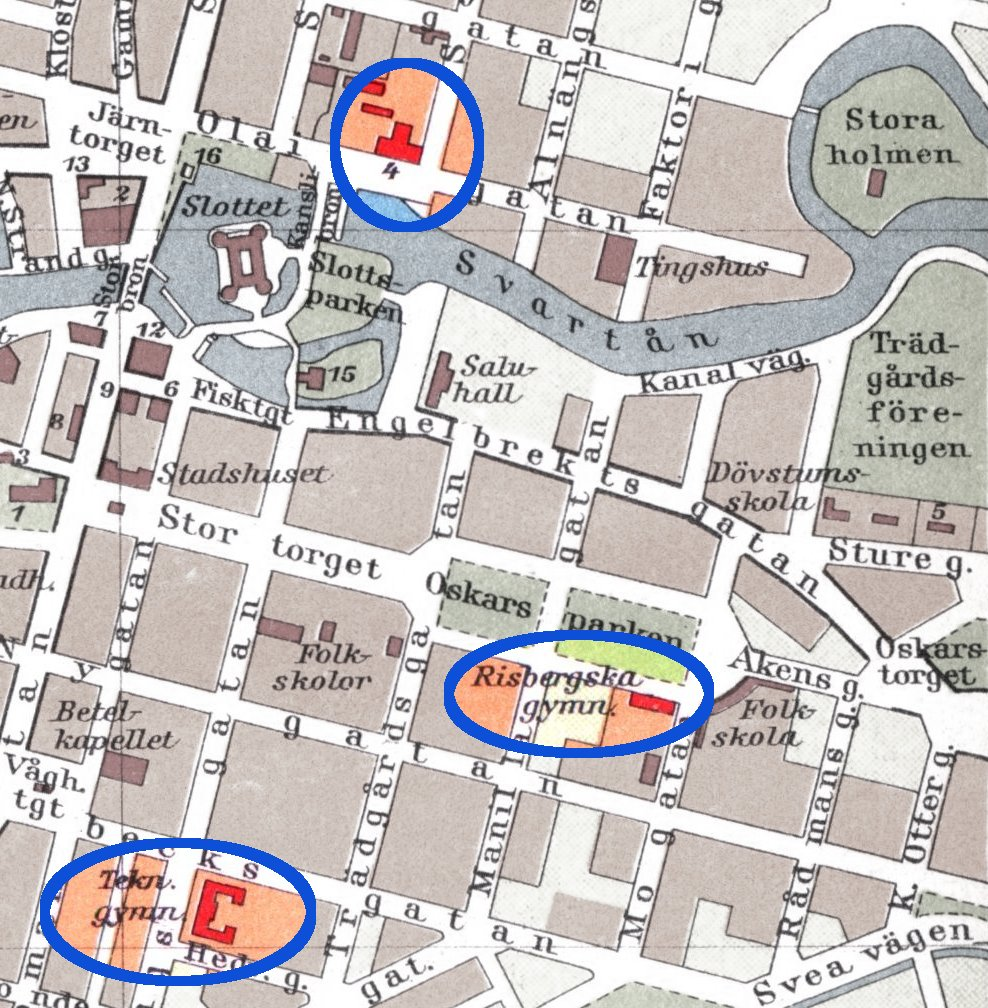
Map of Örebro from 1928, with the three high schools circled. North of Svartån is Karolinska. In the southwest is Teknis.

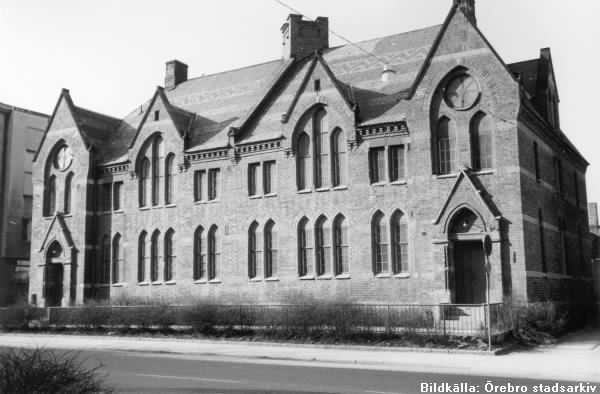
The Nikolaiskola School on Trädgårdsgatan ("Garden Street") served for a time as an annex to the educational institution.

Risbergska Gymnasium was founded in 1863 as a private girls' school. It was expanded in 1924 to include secondary education, which in 1931 became public under the name högre allmänna läroverket för flickor ("girls' school"). The name was changed in 1960 to Nikolai högre allmänna läroverket and in 1966 to Risbergska skolan. The girls' school was municipalized in the 1930s and was then called kommunala flickskolan.

Risbergska Gymnasium was named after Emilie Risberg (1815–1890) who founded Örebro Elementary School for Girls in 1863. It had 50 students and 12 teachers. She was the gymnasium's first principal until 1878. From 1868, the school was housed in Videstrandska Gården on the corner of Olaigatan and Faktorigatan, but moved in 1904 to a property at Oskarsparken, designed by city architect Magnus Dahlander. The private girls' school got a neighbor at Oskarsparken in the fall of 1925, when the municipal elementary school Engelbrektsskolan was inaugurated, designed by architect Axel Brunskog.

In the 1920s, the question arose whether girls should also be given the opportunity to attend upper secondary education in Örebro. Karolinska Gymnasium had 800 students, all boys, and there was no point in increasing the number or giving girls admission. Frustrated that the city council did nothing about the matter, the board of the private Risbergska School took the initiative to start teaching girls after the sixth grade from the autumn semester of 1924, which corresponded to the first year of the upper secondary school's Latin line (without Greek). The school lacked the right to graduate, i.e., the right to award a matriculation examination, so the girls had to take the final exam at Karolinska Gymnasium.

Risbergska Gymnasium was overcrowded. In 1925, the school applied to the city council to expand the premises for the provisional gymnasium, or to start a separate girls' school. A municipal investigation was appointed, which was completed in May 1928. The city council applied to the government to establish a girls' school in Örebro. The Riksdag decided so in the spring of 1930 and the government on 23 January 1931. Teaching at the state- and municipally-funded "higher general school for girls" began in the autumn of 1931. Nils Bergsten became the principal. The girls' school consisted of a 4-year realskola and a 4-year Latin gymnasium. However, the premises were the same as before, shared with Risbergska gymnasium.

During the 1930s, the private Risbergska skolan was also municipalized and continued under the name "Kommunala flickskolan". There were 48 municipal girls' schools in Sweden in 1955, in accordance with a statute of 24 September 1928. The principal from 1954 was Anna Lindeberg (born 1916).

In 1936, the city's board of trustees determined that the school was still as overcrowded as in 1927. City architect Georg Arn was commissioned to design a new school building, which was inaugurated on 27 October 1938. In various stages from 1955 to 1960, pavilions with more classrooms were added, and additional premises were rented from the Technical High School (now Rudbecksgymnasiet). In the autumn of 1956, a new school canteen was opened at Oskarsparken 2, shared by the girls' school and Engelbrektsskolan.

In the autumn of 1939, a 3-year secondary school was added, and in 1954, a general secondary school was established. In the autumn of 1960, boys were also admitted and the school was named Nikolai Higher General Secondary School. It then had 900 students, of whom 400 were in the secondary school.

In 1966, the high school was once again named Risbergska skolan. It moved to the newly built premises on the outskirts of Örebro in 1971, built in yellow brick with copper details, on land belonging to Rosta gård, the premises that now houses Campus Risbergska. The premises also housed the National High School for the deaf and hearing impaired as well as education for students with autism. However, the ventilation system was undersized, which led to bad air and mold. It was replaced with a more modern system in the fall of 2007. In the school year 2009–10, the gymnasium had 1,400 students in the programs for natural sciences, social sciences, behavioural sciences, nursing, children and leisure, and aesthetics, and was a national gymnasium for the deaf and hearing impaired.

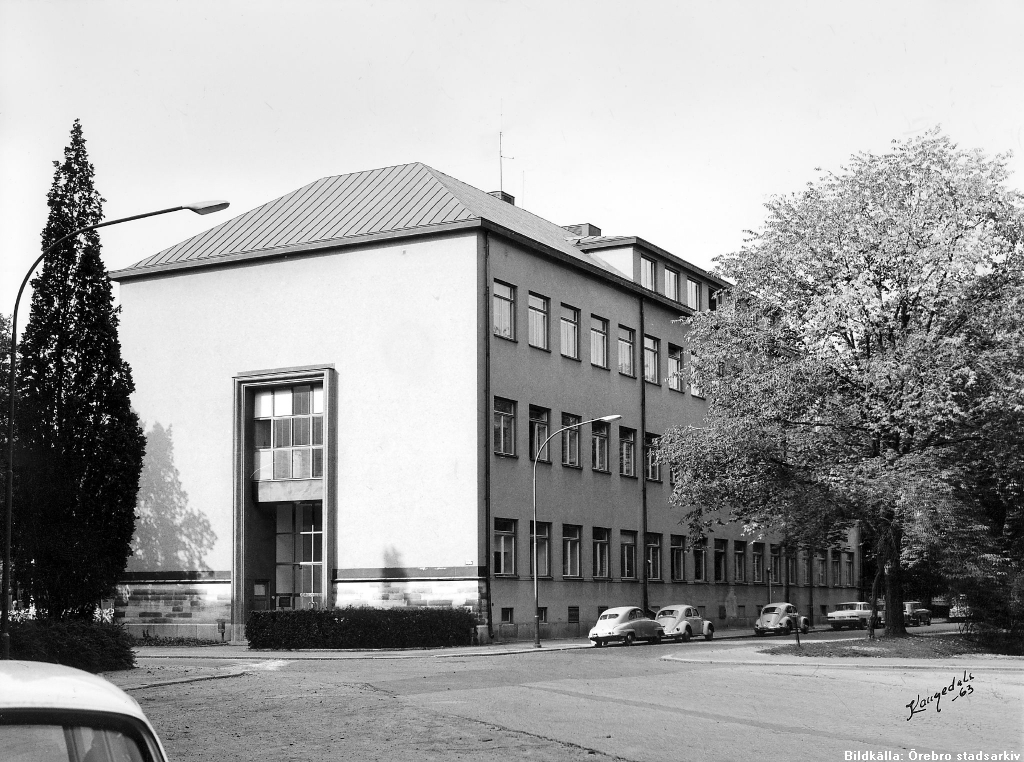
Municipal girls' school in 1963

=== Alumni ===
- Abgar Barsom, Allswedish football player in Syrianska FC
- Henry Chu, TV host
- Kata Dalström, politician
- Jasmine Kara, singer, writer
- Kristofer Lundström, TV and radio presenter, journalist
- Pernilla Månsson Colt, TV presenter
- Gladys del Pilar, singer
- Nikola Sarcevic, musician
- Martin Stenmarck, singer

== Campus Risbergska ==
In 2015, Örebro Municipality presented a proposal that Risbergska Gymnasium should be closed. This was because the high school had approximately 350 students on premises that could accommodate approximately 1,400 students. After the spring semester of 2016, the school was closed and in the autumn its students were transferred to other high schools in the city.

The decision was made to use the building for the municipality's adult education service (komvux), which had previously been spread across several different locations. After a renovation, the newly renamed Campus Risbergska was inaugurated in November 2017. A 'learning centre' to aid students, including those at university, opened at Risbergska in 2018.

On 4 February 2025, a shooting occurred on campus. The school was closed for several months following this and reopened in August 2025.

=== Courses ===
Campus Risbergska caters to adults over the age of 20 and offers primary and secondary education, Swedish for immigrants courses, vocational training and special education. All courses are provided free of charge and students can apply for financial support from CSN.

== See also ==
- Schools in Örebro
