= 2024 Trångsund school shooting =

School shooting in Trångsund, Sweden

Trångsund school shooting
- Trångsund School (Stockholm)
- Location: 59.233°N 18.1325°E; Trångsund School; Trångsund, Sweden
- Date: 4 September 2024 c. 8:30 (CET)
- Attack type: School shooting
- Weapon: .32-caliber Zastava M70 semi-automatic pistol
- Deaths: 0
- Injuries: 1
- Perpetrator: 15-year-old boy
- Motive: "Personal conflict"

On 4 September 2024, a 14-year-old student was shot in the head inside a restroom at Trångsund School in Trångsund, Sweden, by a 15-year-old classmate. The victim survived with serious injuries. The perpetrator was arrested shortly after the attack and was later convicted of attempted murder and weapons offences.

The incident received national attention because school shootings are rare in Sweden and occurred amid growing public concern over youth violence and firearms offences.

== Shooting ==
On 4 September 2024, at around 8:30, two students, aged 14 and 15 respectively, were inside a school bathroom of the Trångsund School when one of them pulled out a gun and put it in the mouth of the other student and pulled the trigger. The shot entered through the nose and the bullet went down through the mouth and lodged in the vertebrae of the neck. Despite this he survived and was awake and conscious, and was able to get help. The victim was taken to hospital conscious, and authorities reported no other suspects. The school was temporarily closed, and an investigation into the incident was launched.

The shooter fled the school on foot but was handed over to the police along with the gun by his parents and arrested on suspicion of attempted murder and weapons offences. Police at first incorrectly stated that the weapon used was an air gun but they retracted this statement quickly.

== Perpetrator and motive ==
The perpetrator was a 15-year-old ninth grade student of the Trångsund School born in Aleppo, Syria. He came to Sweden with his family during the 2015 European migrant crisis in the fall. He has been a Swedish citizen since 2019. The perpetrator was described as a calm and emotional boy with an interest in sport. He had reportedly began to get involved with street gangs which is how he acquired the semi-automatic Crvena Zastava handgun which he said that he "loves more than himself". His motive was reportedly a personal conflict with the victim.

== Legal proceedings ==
In January 2025 the 15‑year‑old was formally charged with attempted murder, gross weapons offences and preparation for murder; he denied wrongdoing, asserting it was an accident. In February 2025 the Södertörn District Court found that the evidence did not support the claim of accident and sentenced him to two years and two months of closed youth-confinement care for attempted murder, weapon offences and conspiracy to commit murder.

The Södertörn District Court where the trial took place.

== Aftermath and reactions ==
Prime Minister Ulf Kristersson described the event as "absolutely terrible" and he commented that "School shootings are not something we associate with Sweden." Minister of Justice Gunnar Strömmer stated that: "I take what happened very seriously. It is especially serious when acts of violence occur at a school."

The shooting caused debate about school safety in Sweden. The Minister for Schools Lotta Edholm suggested that schools should have the right to search students and their belongings. The jurist and author Evin Cetin also suggested that schools should have metal detectors installed to prevent students from bringing weapons. The Chairman of the Primary School Committee in Huddinge, Rasmus Lenefors, described the event as a dark day and a new step for Swedish society.

After the Örebro school shooting in 2025, Ulf Kristersson compared it to the Trångsund shooting and other previous school attacks in a speech from the Prime Minister's Office.

== See also ==
- Örebro school shooting
- Kungälv school shooting
- List of school attacks in Sweden
- 2024 Apalachee High School shooting (occurred on the same day)
