= 2022 Malmö school stabbing =

Stabbing attack in Malmö, Sweden

Malmö school stabbing
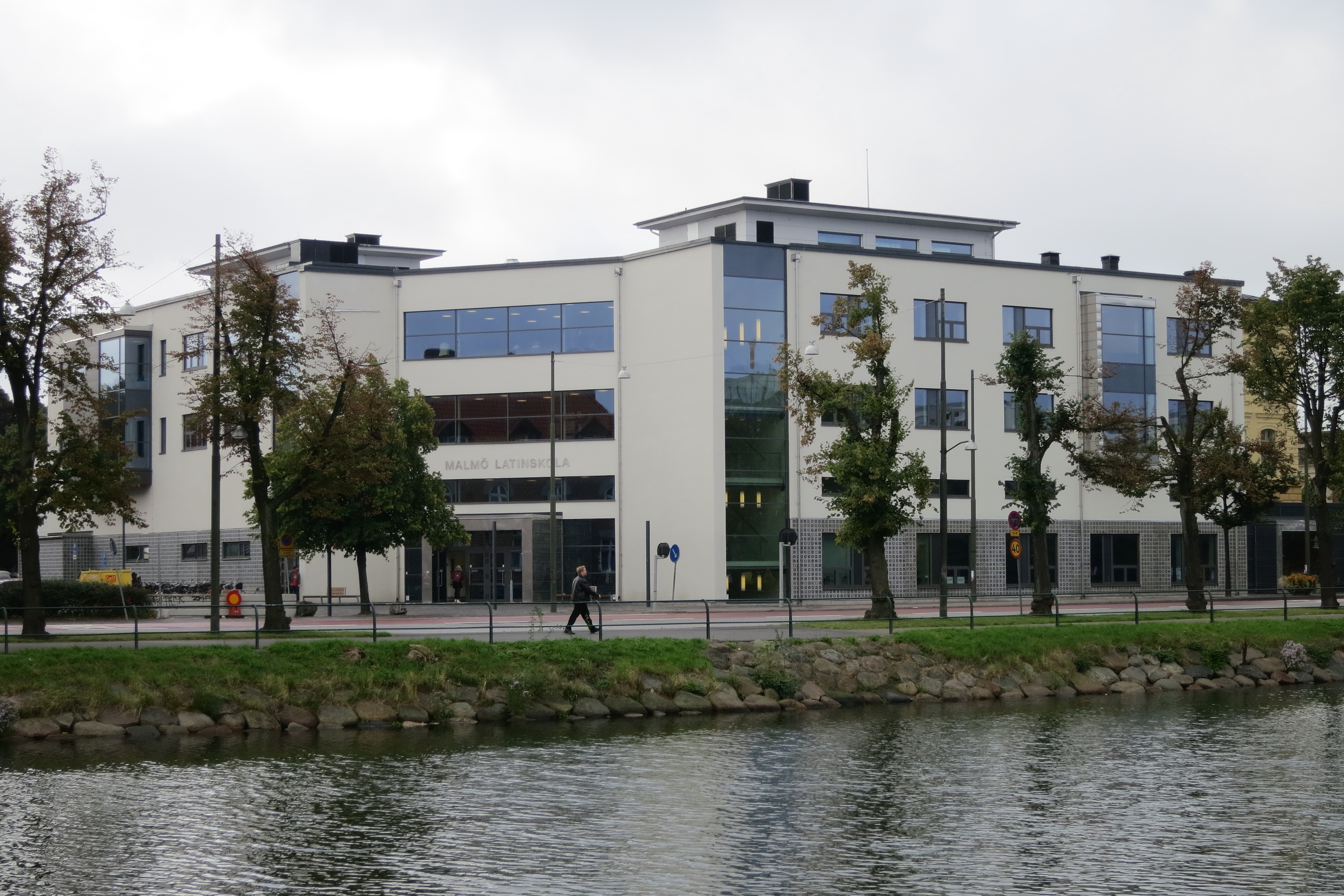
- Malmö Latin School
- Location: 55.6017°N 13.0076°E; Malmö Latin School, Malmö, Sweden
- Date: 21 March 2022
- Attack type: School stabbing Axe attack
- Weapons: Hatchet; Hunting knife (unused)
- Deaths: 2
- Injuries: 0
- Victims: Victoria Edström and Sara Böök
- Perpetrator: Fabian Cederholm
- Motive: Generalized discontentment with life and society
- Verdict: Guilty
- Convictions: 2 counts of murder
- Sentence: Life imprisonment

On 21 March 2022, a stabbing took place at Malmö Latin School in Malmö, Sweden, during which 18-year-old Fabian Cederholm stabbed and killed two female teachers with an axe and a knife before disarming himself, calling emergency services and being arrested by first responders.

It is the third deadliest attack on a school in Swedish history, after the Risbergska school shooting in Örebro in 2025, in which 10 people were killed and the Trollhättan school stabbing six years prior in 2015, where three people were murdered.

== Stabbing ==
At approximately 5:10 p.m., Cederholm entered Malmö Latin School and killed two female teachers, Victoria Edström and Sara Böök with an axe.

At 5:15, Cederholm made a phone call to emergency services explaining he had killed two teachers. First responders arrived at 5:25 p.m. and arrested Cederholm on the third floor of the building. Cederholm laid on the floor and did not resist arrest.

First responders also discovered the bodies of Edström and Böök. They were taken to hospital by ambulance but were pronounced dead.

== Perpetrator ==
Fabian Vidar Cederholm (born 23 December 2003) was identified as the perpetrator and was 18 at the time of the attack. A then-student of Malmö Latin School, Cederholm was not known by police and had no past criminal record.

== Legal proceedings ==
In September 2022, Cederholm was charged with two counts of murder and was sentenced to life imprisonment, making him the first teenager in Swedish history to receive such a sentence.

== Reactions ==
Prime Minister Magdalena Andersson said she received the news with "sadness and dismay". In a Facebook post, she wrote: "Now the police and prosecutors must find out what happened, so that the person behind this is held accountable for their actions." Subsequently, all classes scheduled for the next day were cancelled.

== See also ==
- 2003–10 Malmö shootings
- Eslöv school stabbing and Kristianstad school stabbing, two non-fatal school stabbings in Sweden in the months before the Malmö attack
