= Peter Mangs =

Swedish serial killer (born 1972)

- Born: 1972 (age 53–54); Sweden
- Motive: Attempting to start a race war

Details
- Date: June 2003–October 2010
- Locations: Malmö, Sweden
- Targets: Non-whites and people he viewed as "race traitors"
- Killed: 3
- Injured: 12
- Weapon: Glock 19

Peter Mangs (born 1972), sometimes nicknamed Laser Man II (Swedish: Lasermannen II), is a Swedish serial killer and lone wolf terrorist. He was responsible for at least three racially motivated murders between 2003 and 2010, and twelve attempted murders, in a series of serial shootings in the city of Malmö. In 2012 Mangs was found guilty on two counts of murder and four counts of attempted murder, and given a life sentence.

== Early life ==
Peter Mangs was born in 1972, and was raised in the Lindängen area of Malmö. He was raised by a single mother. Mangs had an immigrant background himself via a father born in Närpes, Finland.

Mangs professed to feel alienated and frustrated with society. His lawyers argued that he had Asperger syndrome. Mangs suspected that he had the disorder since at least 2005, when he joined an association for people with Asperger syndrome, and was formally diagnosed in May 2009. He had a very high score of 19 on the Autistic Diagnostic Observation Schedule (ADOS).

Mangs was familiar with white supremacist literature and had read about lone wolf tactical materials. He had read both of William Luther Pierce's far right-novels The Turner Diaries and Hunter. He was fixated on racist serial killer Joseph Paul Franklin, to whom Pierce dedicated Hunter. Mangs became aware of Franklin through the book.

== Murders and attempted murders ==
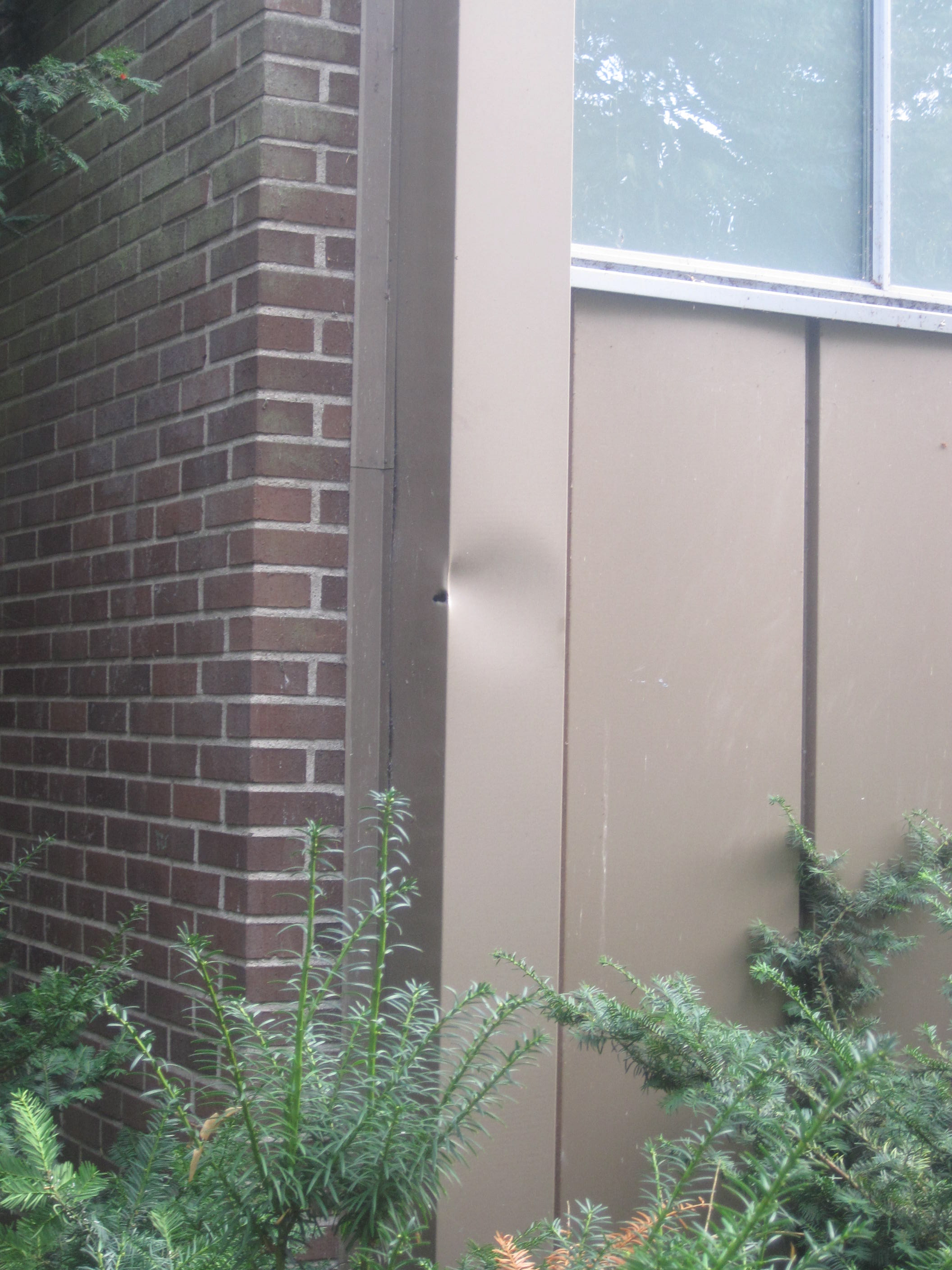
Bullet hole in the façade of Malmö Borgarskola's gymnasium; according to information from the police in 2013, a work by Peter Mangs.

Mangs committed the killings aiming to ignite a race war by targeting people in select categories who represented types of people who he believed should not live in Malmö: "race traitors", Muslims, Roma, and Swedes of African descent. In June and July 2003, at the age of 31, he killed two men, 65-year-old Kooros Effatian and 23-year-old Firas al-Shariah; he selected them as victims due to their names indicating non-white heritage. Afterwards he continued his murder attempts for several years.

In fall 2009, he began shooting people in clustered attacks. These were carried out with a 9mm Glock 19 handgun. On 9 October 2009, he shot and killed Trez West Persson, an ethnically Swedish woman sitting in a car with her Albanian friend. While the media speculated that she had been killed by accident and her partner was the intended target, the targeting was in fact deliberate; Mangs wanted to emulate Franklin by killing a woman whom he viewed as a race traitor. This murder was linked to the other shootings through forensic evidence, showing that the weapon used was the same gun as the one used in several of the other attacks.

The attacks soon spread fear among the substantial immigrant population of Malmö. "Many people are frightened at the moment", said Tahmoures Yassami, the leader of the Iranian-Swedish Association in Malmö, "especially families who have children." The local police warned against panic, pointing out that the risk for any individual of being shot was very low. At the same time, they cautioned ethnic minorities to avoid secluded areas after dark, which was when the attacks had been taking place.

== Investigation ==
The shooter was compared to the likes of John Ausonius, dubbed the "Laser Man" (Swedish: Lasermannen), who committed similar crimes in 1991–92, targeting eleven men of immigrant origin in the Stockholm and Uppsala area, killing one.

On 6 November 2010, Swedish police announced that they had arrested a man they suspected was the shooter. According to Malmö police he was under suspicion of one murder and seven murder attempts. The man arrested was a 38-year-old Swedish man, Peter Mangs. He expressed strong anti-immigrant sentiments and admiration for John Ausonius. In May of 2015, Mangs claimed through a biography that he wrote that he had planned to kill Zlatan Ibrahimović. When he returned to kill him, he was gone.

== Legal proceedings ==
In 2012, Mangs was found guilty on two counts of murder and four counts of attempted murder, and given a life sentence. The Scania and Blekinge Court of Appeal denied an attempt by Mangs to overturn his sentence, convicting him of an additional three attempted murders, on 25 April 2013. A further request for appeal was denied by the Supreme Court in June of the same year.

== See also ==
- John Ausonius
- Malmö school stabbing
- Trollhättan school stabbing
- Eslöv school stabbing
