= Trångsund =

District of Huddinge municipality, Sweden

Coordinates: 59°13′40″N 18°07′50″E

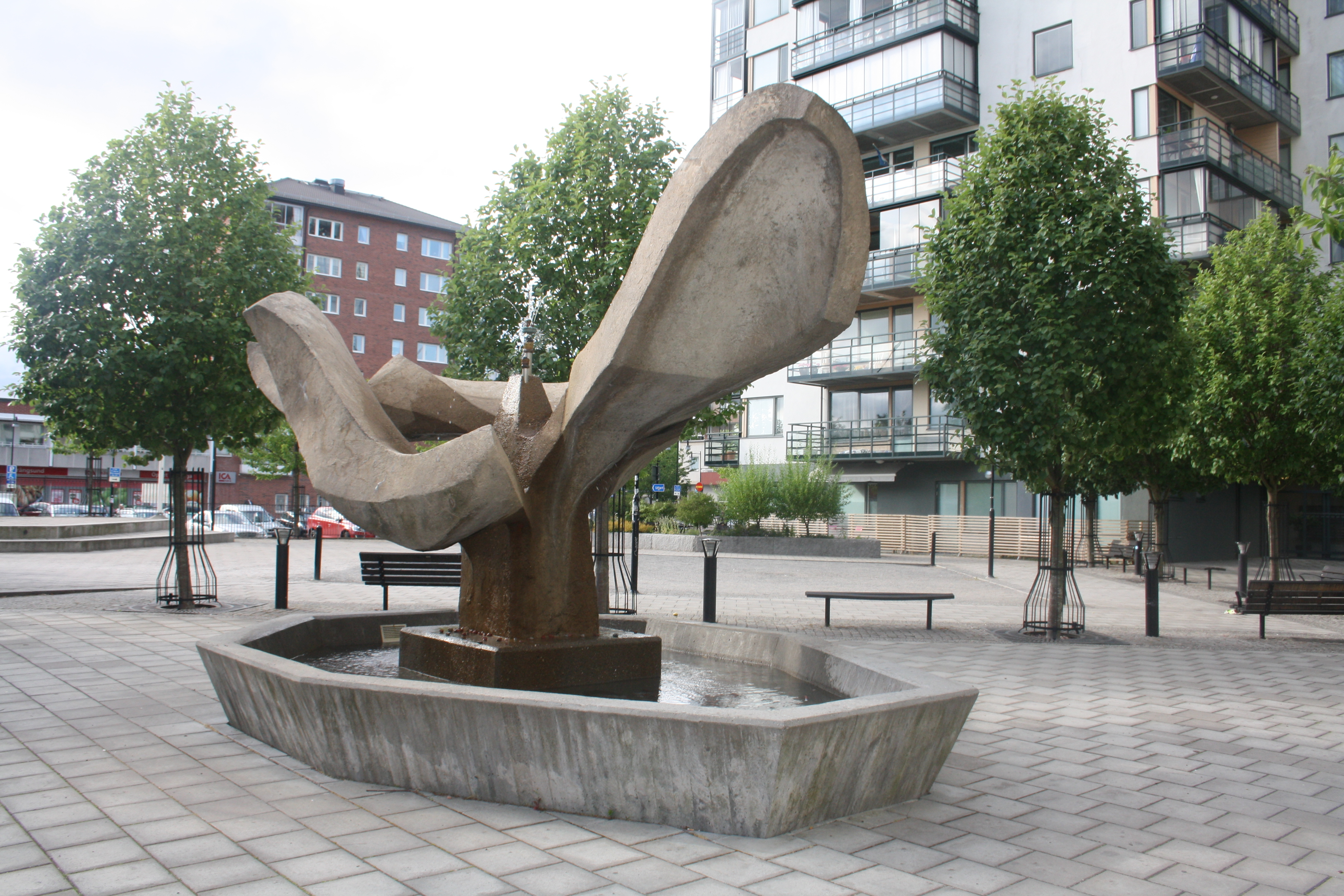
Trångsund centrum

Trångsund (Swedish pronunciation: [trɔŋˈsɵnːd]) is a part of Huddinge to the south of Stockholm located between the two lakes Magelungen and Drevviken. Trångsund had 9,114 inhabitants in 2019. Trångsund is 17 minutes away from Stockholm City railway station by train on the Bålsta-Nynäshamn line of the Stockholm commuter rail.

== Sports ==
The following sports clubs are located in Trångsund:

- Skogås-Trångsunds FF

== See also ==
- Trångsund school shooting
