= Omni (website) =

Swedish mobile news app and web magazine

- Alla nyheter. Alla perspektiv. I en app.
- Type: Online newspaper
- Owner: Schibsted
- Founders: Markus Gustafsson; Ian Vännmann
- Editor-in-chief: Markus Gustafsson
- Founded: November 2013; 12 years ago
- Language: Swedish
- Country: Sweden
- Website: omni.se

Omni is a Swedish news aggregator and news bulletin service developed by Schibsted (Vend Marketplaces ASA). It presents a continuous flow of news from Swedish and international media, social media, live broadcasts and press releases. Omni is available as an app on Android, iOS, and the Web. A subscription is required to read some articles.

Schibsted released a beta version in March 2013 and the official app in November 2013.

== History ==
The development of the service began in November 2011. In 2015, founders Markus Gustafsson and Ian Vännman were nominated for the Stora Journalistpriset annual award as "Innovator of the Year".

In November 2017, the service Omni Ekonomi was released as an app. Omni Ekonomi has its own editorial staff that summarizes news from business media, and monitors market developments. By June 2020, Omni Ekonomi was relaunched as a premium service and had entered collaboration with several international business media platforms, such as the Financial Times, The Economist, Bloomberg and Nikkei.

Omni introduced Omni mer in February 2022, an additional service that opens paywalls of certain international media, by paying for a monthly fee. Omni mer provides an explanatory background to specific news events.

== Technical platform ==
As of today, Omni's own in-house developed publishing platform is being used by several media platforms within the Schibsted media group, including Svenska Dagbladet, Aftonbladet, Verdens Gang and Aftenposten.
