= Komvux =

Swedish school form for adults

Komvux (short for kommunal vuxenutbildning, literally 'municipal adult education') is a form of secondary education for adults in Sweden. The government of Sweden allocates funds to the municipalities for this type of education. It is primarily intended for adults who did not finish primary or secondary school, or who did not achieve the grades needed for higher education.

This form of education has existed since 1968, although the forms for it have changed and some municipalities no longer use the term Komvux. Courses offered include both theoretical school subjects such as languages and mathematics, and courses directed towards a profession, such as administration or business economics.

Other government-funded adult education in Sweden includes särvux (adult education for persons with special needs), KY (qualified vocational education), and SFI (Swedish for immigrants); in smaller municipalities these forms of adult education are often coordinated by the same education centre.
