= Browning BAR =

Semi-auto rifle

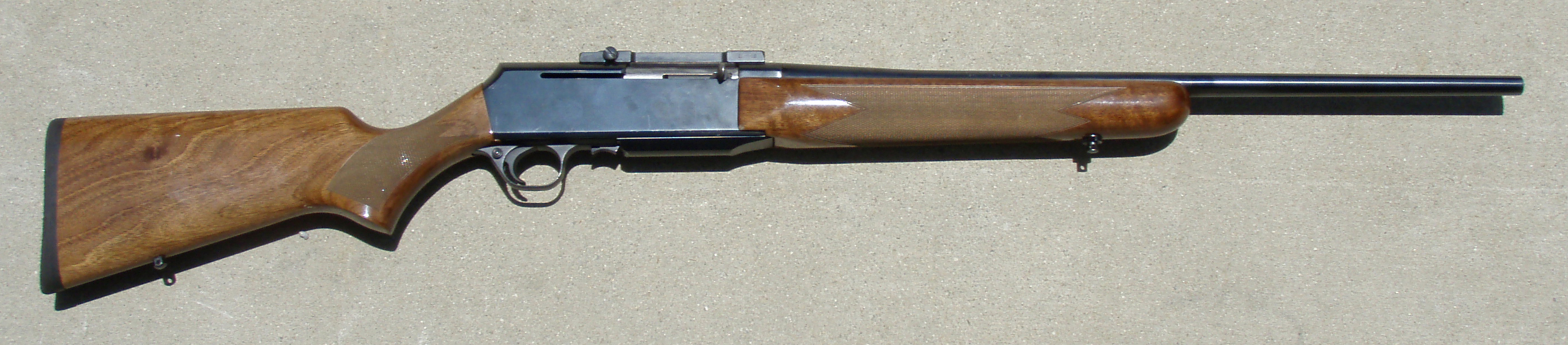
- Browning BAR Chambered In .30-06 Springfield
- Type: Semi-automatic rifle
- Place of origin: Belgium

Production history
- Designer: Marcel Olinger and Bruce Warren Browning
- Manufacturer: Browning Arms Company, assembled in Belgium

Specifications (Current production BAR)
- Mass: 6–8 lb (2.7–3.6 kg)
- Length: 41–45 in (1,041–1,143 mm)
- Barrel length: 20–24 in (508–610 mm)
- Cartridge: Short and long-action cartridges
- Action: Gas-operated piston, rotating bolt with interrupted thread
- Rate of fire: Semi-automatic
- Feed system: Detachable box magazine
- Sights: Open sights (depending on model) and optional scope base

The Browning BAR is a gas-operated, semi-automatic rifle produced by the Browning Arms Company in Belgium. The rifle loads from a detachable box magazine. Browning introduced a redesigned BAR in 1966.

== Variants ==
There are several models of the Browning BAR; Safari, Long- and ShortTrac, and Lightweight Stalker. Both LongTrac and ShortTrac versions are available in a Mossy Oak takedown, basic, and Stalker variant.

The Safari model has an engraved steel receiver and walnut stock. The barrel is 22, 23 or 24 in (560, 580 or 610 mm) long, depending on the cartridge. The Safari is the only model with the Browning BOSS (Ballistic Optimizing Shooting System). The system reduces recoil and enhances accuracy with an adjustable muzzle brake and weight.

The Lightweight Stalker model has an aluminum-alloy receiver. The stock is matte black synthetic instead of a walnut stock. The stalker is the only model to feature iron sights. The barrel is 20, 22, 23 or 24 in (510, 560, 580 or 610 mm) long.

LongTrac and ShortTrac models feature an aluminum-alloy receiver, a plastic trigger guard and floorplate, and more stylised stock. The basic version has a walnut stock; the Stalker version has a matte-black finish and a black composite stock. The Mossy Oak version has a composite stock, and the entire rifle is painted in camouflage colors. Depending on variant and cartridge, the barrel is 22, 23 or 24 in (560, 580 or 610 mm). Long or Short differ on the action length, and the ShortTrac (BAR ST) can accommodate cartridge lengths up to .308 Winchester, while LongTrac (BAR LT) can accommodate longer cartridges. Since the MK3 update, all BAR rifles have the same long action length, while for instance older BAR versions in .308 have a ShortTrac action up to and including .308 Win.

The BAR Mark II was introduced in 1993 and is currently in production. The Mark II has a redesigned gas and buffer system, new bolt release lever, and engraved receiver.
