= Disability policy in Sweden =

Of the 10.23 million people living in Sweden, it is estimated that around 20% are living with a disability. Since the late 20th century, Swedish policy toward disabilities has been centered around the idea of equal opportunity and equal rights for all. National, regional, and local governments play a part in creating an equal society, giving those with disabilities the chance to be economically and socially stable.

Currently, Sweden has a two tier disability pension program. The first tier is a universal disability pension program that allows anyone between the ages of 16 and 64 to receive disability pay if they are unable to do a quarter of what they could initially do. The second tier encompasses an earnings-related disability benefit that depends upon the contributions made by the workers and the level of disability.

== Background ==
In the 19th and early 20th century, Sweden had little to no legislation protecting people with disabilities and openly treated them as second class citizens who didn't deserve to have equal opportunity. They would incarcerate people that were believed to have a disability, including children as young as seven years old to ensure that they wouldn't reproduce or contaminate society. This was Sweden's initial solution for dealing with people with disabilities.

In the mid-20th century, this began to gradually change as Sweden started to pass legislation that supported people with disabilities living outside of institutions and they began to toy with the idea of other programs that would help people with disabilities. In recent years, they have taken great strides towards guaranteeing equal rights and opportunities to people that have disabilities through the implementation of government programs and legislation, regarding education, employment, housing, and transportation.

== Government programs and legislation ==
Since the 1980s, drastic additions to government programs and legislation have closed the gap of inequality between people with disabilities and those that are full functioning members of society, giving people with disabilities the opportunity to have jobs, receive an education, and live in their own housing with help if necessary. In order to qualify for any sort of disability pay, a person has to be able to do 25% less than what they were initially able to do. To qualify for full disability pay, a person has to be able to do 84% less than what they were initially able to do.

=== Social Services Act ===
The Social Services Act implemented in 1982 and since changed many times covers a wide array of people in addition to persons with functional disabilities, including the elderly, children, crime victims, and people that have alcohol or drug addictions. It states that those who are under the age of 65 with a functional disability are able to request services such as a companion to help with errands, special housing options that would allow them to be cared for 24 hours a day, and home help services if they need assistance with personal care.

=== Cash sickness benefit ===
If a worker is ill and unable to work, they will receive full pay for up to 90 days.

=== Education Act ===
The Education Act guarantees that starting at the age of 6, all children will have equal access to education opportunities. It also insures that children who may need extra help in school, meaning children that have disabilities will receive it.

=== Housing grants ===
These allow people to request grants in order to modify their living space to make it more accessible with their disability.

=== Vocational rehabilitation ===
Vocational rehabilitation is automatically offered to every person with a disability, but in order to receive a referral to a rehabilitation facility, it has to be believed that you will be able to do at least half of what you could do before the disability.

=== Car subsidies ===
People who are unable to ride public transportation or have a difficult time can request subsidies that help them purchase a car so they are able to get around easier.

== Employment ==
A significant amount of research has been done on the employment of people with disabilities in Sweden and it has been found that although employers don't have a direct bias against people with disabilities, they are much more hesitant to hire them because of the future problems that they expect. Although there has been improvement, research has found that the number of adults with mental disabilities is extremely low in the regular workforce. Those that are working and have disabilities often feel that they are being left out of social outings and are given work that isn't relative to their level of skill, which causes dissatisfaction, increasing the chance that they will retire early.

=== Sheltered employment ===
One of the solutions for increasing the number of people with disabilities in the workforce has been sheltered employment. In Sweden, there's only one foundation that does this, called Samhall, which was established as a limited liability company in 1992 and receives government funding and subsidies to train their workers. Unlike most other countries, Sweden doesn't have any legislation or policies that are directed at sheltered employment policies. In Sweden, the average age of a worker with a disability in sheltered employment is 46 years old and the average time that a person with a disability works there is around 8 years.

Unlike many other countries, Sweden allows these workers with disabilities to sign a contract that is identical to what a general worker would sign. Another unique factor in Sweden is that almost 100% of workers with disabilities working in sheltered employment jobs are members of a union, guaranteeing them collective bargaining. The main goal of sheltered employment is to offer people with disabilities the opportunity to work with the same rights that they would have if they didn't have a disability. It also can help persons get back into the regular workforce, although, this is rare depending upon their disability.
