= Sten Fransson =

Swedish murderer

- Born: Sten Adolf Reinhold Fransson; 11 May 1934; Strömsund, Sweden
- Died: 29 September 2012 (aged 78); Kristinehamn, Sweden
- Body discovered: Forensic Psychiatry Department
- Resting place: New Cemetery, Kristinehamn
- Occupation: Military officer
- Employer(s): Bergslagen Artillery Regiment (A 9); Armed Forces Medical Board
- Status: Deceased

Details
- Victims: 4
- Country: Sweden
- Locations: Vattnäs (1974); Kristinehamn (2012)
- Weapons: Pistol, knife

Sten Adolf Reinhold Fransson (11 May 1934 – 29 September 2012) was a Swedish man notorious for committing multiple murders, including a triple killing in 1975 — an incident that later became known in Sweden as the Vattnäs Drama (Swedish: Vattnäsdramat) — and the murder of his wife in 2012. Born in Strömsund, Jämtland County, Sweden, Fransson came from a large family and began his military career around 1950 at the Bergslagen Artillery Regiment in Kristinehamn. Colleagues described him as socially withdrawn, emotionally unstable, and prone to a volatile temper. He married young and had children, but that marriage ended in divorce. During the 1970s, he struggled with alcohol abuse and emotional instability.

While serving as a warrant officer, Fransson began a relationship with Gunilla Persson, a folk musician from Vattnäs, Dalarna. Their relationship was troubled, particularly with Gunilla's mother, Hilma. On Christmas Eve 1975, Fransson visited Gunilla's family. After arguments escalated, he retrieved his service pistol and shot Gunilla, her parents Anders and Hilma Persson, and Gunilla's 10-year-old daughter Anette. Gunilla and her parents were killed, while Anette survived but suffered permanent spinal injuries. Fransson attempted suicide, but his gun was empty, and he called for help. He was arrested without resistance.

During his trial, Fransson admitted the killings but had little memory of the events. Psychiatric evaluation determined he acted under severe mental disorder, and he was sentenced to institutional psychiatric care at Säter Hospital. After approximately nine months, he was declared mentally fit and released, a decision that later drew criticism. He reunited with his former wife, remarried, and worked in administrative positions within the Armed Forces. The 1975 murders prompted national debate in Sweden over the regulations allowing military personnel to carry service weapons off duty.

On 13 August 2012, Fransson fatally stabbed his wife Ulla-Britt in their Kristinehamn apartment and attempted to harm himself. Investigators cited jealousy, emerging dementia, and possible medication influence as factors. He died of a heart attack on 29 September 2012 before the case could go to trial.

== Background ==
Sten Fransson was born on 11 May 1934 in Strömsund, Jämtland County, Sweden, into a large family. After completing primary school (folkskola), he volunteered for military service and began his career around 1950 at the Bergslagen Artillery Regiment (A 9) in Kristinehamn. During his military career he received both training and employment at the regiment. Colleagues later described him as socially withdrawn and having difficulties with interpersonal relations. He was not regarded as particularly distinguished as a soldier. Former regimental commander Colonel Gösta Mittag-Leffler later stated that Fransson appeared relatively unremarkable and that few people had close contact with him.

While stationed in Kristinehamn, Fransson married at a young age. His wife was only 16 years old at the time, and the couple had to apply for royal permission (dispens) in order to marry. They had children together and lived for many years in Kristinehamn. That marriage later ended in divorce. During the 1970s Fransson struggled increasingly with alcohol abuse and emotional instability, something known among colleagues. He was described as having a volatile temper and, according to coworkers, could “lose control completely,” for example during card games.

In 1974 Fransson served as a warrant officer (fanjunkare) at A 9 and frequently trained at the Army Artillery School in Trängslet, Älvdalen. It was during this period that he met Gunilla Margareta Bohm, née Persson, then 31 years old, from the village of Vattnäs outside Mora in Dalarna. They began a relationship. Gunilla worked at the district court clerk's office (häradsskrivarkontoret) in Mora and was well known locally as a folk musician. She was an accomplished fiddler with a strong interest in traditional Dalecarlian folk music. For several years she performed together with two other young women from the village in the trio known as Vattnäsflickorna ("The Vattnäs Girls"). The group played polskas, waltzes and traditional tunes from the Orsa and Mora regions and appeared frequently at folk music gatherings. They also made appearances on Swedish radio and television, including participation in a folk music television program associated with Eric Öst. Gunilla later limited her performances mainly to local events.

Gunilla had previously been married and had a daughter, Anette, born in 1965. That marriage had ended, and around the same time she became involved with Fransson. The couple never lived together permanently, but Fransson often stayed with Gunilla and her parents on weekends in Vattnäs. Relations between Fransson and Gunilla's mother, Hilma Persson, were strained. Fransson reportedly had difficulty getting along with her and was sometimes made to sleep in the hallway upstairs when visiting.

== The 1975 murders ==
Vattnäs murders
- Location of the murders
- Location: 61.04603°N 14.60942°E; Åsenvägen 10, Vattnäs, Sweden
- Date: 24 December 1975 c. 22:00 (CET)
- Target: Fiancé and her family
- Attack type: Familicide
- Weapon: Service pistol
- Deaths: 3
- Injuries: 1
- Victims: 4
- Perpetrator: Sten Fransson
- Verdict: Guilty
- Convictions: Murder (3 counts); Attempted murder
- Sentence: Institutional psychiatric care

On Christmas Eve, 24 December 1975, Fransson, then 41 years old, traveled to Vattnäs to spend Christmas with Gunilla and her family: her parents Anders Gustav Persson, aged 73, and Hilma Persson, aged 68, as well as Gunilla's 10-year-old daughter Anette. A neighbor who visited the family around 20:00 stated that everything appeared normal at that time. Later in the evening, however, tensions increased. According to Fransson's later statements, the atmosphere was strained and arguments broke out, particularly involving Gunilla's mother.

Shortly after 22:00, Fransson went out to his car and retrieved his 9 mm service pistol, which he carried as part of his military position. He later said he did not want to leave the weapon in the car. When Hilma Persson saw the pistol, she reportedly asked whether he intended to shoot them all. At that moment, Fransson later claimed that "something snapped" in his head. He shot Hilma Persson first. When Gunilla rushed toward him, he shot her as well. He then went downstairs and shot Anders Persson, who was asleep in his bed, firing three shots through the blanket.

Gunilla's daughter Anette, awakened by the gunfire, attempted to flee the house. Barefoot and wearing only her nightgown, she ran toward the front door. Fransson shot her three times: two shots struck her face and head, and one struck her spine around the fifth thoracic vertebrae, damaging her spinal cord. She collapsed only a few meters from the exit. Despite the severity of her injuries, she survived.

Believing that all four victims were dead, Fransson attempted to take his own life. However, his pistol was out of ammunition and merely clicked when he pulled the trigger. He then panicked and called his former wife in Kristinehamn, who urged him to contact emergency services. Fransson then called for an ambulance and police, stating that he had shot four people and that perhaps someone could still be saved.

Police arrived shortly after midnight, in the early hours of 25 December 1975, at the isolated property in Vattnäs, located between Mora and Orsa. Police inspector Karl Erik Ehl was among the first officers to enter the house. He observed that the glass pane in the front door had been shattered, likely by gunfire. Inside the entryway, he found the critically injured 10-year-old girl lying near the door. Fransson was found inside the house, speaking incoherently on the telephone. He offered no resistance and was arrested without incident. The service pistol was found on a table and secured by police.

Further examination of the house revealed Gunilla Persson and her mother Hilma lying upstairs, both shot and dressed in nightclothes. Hilma showed faint signs of life and was transported by ambulance but died before reaching Mora Hospital. Anders Persson was found downstairs in his bed, shot dead. Police officer Sören Mattsson, another of the first officers on the scene, later described the scene as the worst he had encountered.

Anette was rushed to Mora Hospital, where she underwent emergency surgery on the evening of 25 December 1975. She later also received care linked to Falun Hospital. She survived but was left permanently unable to walk due to the spinal injury.

At the time of his arrest, Fransson had a blood alcohol concentration of 1.79‰ and had also taken prescribed medication for depression. Police found that twelve shots had been fired in total. No signs of a struggle were discovered. The killings were described by investigators as execution-style shootings.

== Investigation and trial ==
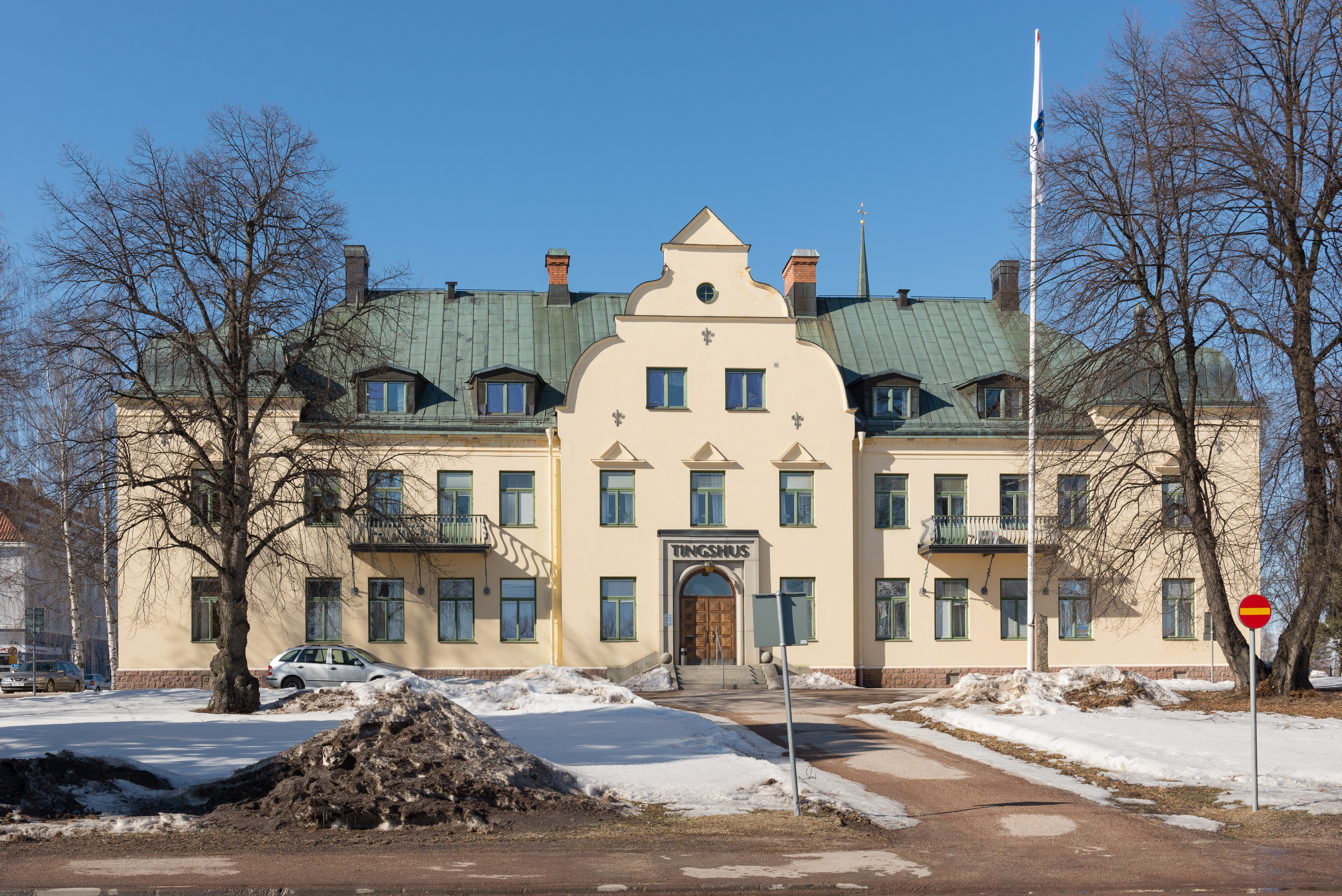
The trial was held in Mora Courthouse.

Chief and County Prosecutor Gunnar Delleryd filed for Fransson's remand on suspicion of murder and attempted murder. Delleryd later participated in proceedings in Mora, together with police chief Hans E. Holm. Fransson admitted to the killings but stated that he remembered very little of the events themselves. In its judgment, Mora District Court noted that it was not possible to fully clarify what had triggered the shooting or the exact sequence of events.

On 12 April 1976, Mora District Court found that Fransson had shot and killed his partner Gunilla Persson and her parents and had attempted to kill the child. A forensic psychiatric evaluation concluded that he had acted under a severe mental disorder equivalent to legal insanity. He was sentenced to institutional psychiatric care and committed to Säter Hospital.

After approximately nine months, (Note: Several sources state nine months. Another source states one year, seven months.) doctors declared him mentally fit, and he was released. This early discharge later became the subject of criticism, with medical officials such as Ulf Christoffersson at Säter stating in 2012 that such a release would not be possible under modern legislation, as courts now supervise discharge decisions. After his release, Fransson re-established contact with his former wife, whom he remarried in 1977. They later had two sons. He obtained an administrative position within the Armed Forces Medical Board in Karlstad.

The three victims of the 1975 murders were buried together on 3 January 1976 at the New Cemetery (Nya Begravningsplatsen) in Mora.

== Aftermath ==
The murders sparked a national debate in Sweden about military personnel carrying service weapons while off duty. Army spokesperson Captain Fred Lundqvist explained that regulations at the time allowed military personnel to carry service weapons during leave or travel, although strict rules applied to storage. Justice Minister Lennart Geijer expressed concern over weapons control, contributing to broader discussions on firearm regulation.

== The 2012 murder ==
Murder of Ulla-Britt Fransson
- Location of the murder
- Location: 59.30716°N 14.08382°E; Dan Broströmsgatan 1 B, Kristinehamn, Sweden
- Date: 13 August 2012 c. 10:17 (CEST)
- Target: Wife
- Attack type: Uxoricide
- Weapon: Knife
- Deaths: 1
- Victim: 1
- Perpetrator: Sten Fransson
- Motive: Unknown
- Verdict: Died before trial

On 13 August 2012 at 10:17, police were alerted to an apartment building on Dan Broströmsgatan 1 B in Kristinehamn, Värmland County. Inside one of the apartments, officers found a 76-year-old woman, Ulla-Britt Fransson, dead from multiple stab wounds. Her husband, Sten Fransson, then 78 years old, was also found inside the apartment with serious knife injuries. He was transported under police guard to Karlstad Central Hospital, where he underwent treatment.

The couple had lived together in the apartment for more than three decades and had not previously been known to police for domestic disturbances. Ulla-Britt had been married to Fransson prior to the 1975 killings; they were divorced at that time but reunited after his release from institutional psychiatric care and later remarried. During this period, Fransson had been active within the housing complex. He worked for a time as a vice-caretaker (vicevärd) in the properties and had also served as chairman of the tenant-owned housing association (bostadsrättsförening). According to neighbors and others familiar with the couple, he was perceived as orderly and authoritative, and he took a strong interest in administrative matters related to the building.

Following the killing, however, relatives and acquaintances of Ulla-Britt provided a markedly different picture of the marriage. One relative stated that trust in Fransson had never existed, explaining: "I have never trusted him, because I myself have heard him threaten her with violence. He decided everything in the marriage, and she always did as he wanted." These statements suggested a relationship characterized by control and fear rather than mutuality, although no formal police reports had previously been filed.

Investigators concluded that Fransson had stabbed his wife to death before attempting to injure himself with the same knife. Chief prosecutor Tomas Olsson led the investigation. Fransson stated that he had no memory of the incident. On 14 August 2012, a first preliminary interrogation was held with Fransson. The interrogation was held at Karlstad Central Hospital. He was remanded on probable cause for murder on 16 August 2012, with the remand hearing held in a hospital room due to his medical condition. Investigators suspected that jealousy combined with emerging dementia and possible medication influence played a role. An indictment was planned for 11 October 2012.

== Death ==
Before the case could proceed to trial, Sten Fransson died on 29 September 2012 in the forensic psychiatric ward in Kristinehamn. He was found by hospital staff. According to information provided to the press, he died of a heart attack. Police confirmed that no crime was suspected, and the murder investigation was therefore closed.

Ulla-Britt Fransson was buried on 30 October 2012 in the memorial grove at the New Cemetery, very close to the murder scene. Sten Fransson was buried in the same memorial grove on 22 May 2013.

== Victims ==
=== 24 December 1975 ===
- Deceased: Anders Gustav Persson (born 14 April 1902). Grandfather of the ten-year-old girl. Shot with three bullets, in the chest and heart, while lying asleep in his bed.
- Deceased: Hilma Persson, née Nisser (born 4 January 1907). Grandmother of the ten-year-old girl. Hit by two bullets, one of which passed through a lung.
- Deceased: Gunilla Margareta Bohm, née Persson (born 10 January 1944). Mother of the ten-year-old girl. Hit by two bullets, one of them in the heart. Had a relationship with Sten Fransson.
- Life-threatening injuries: Anette (born 1965). Attempted to flee through the door but was hit by three bullets, two in the face and one in the spinal cord.

=== 12 August 2012 ===
- Deceased: Ulla-Britt Fransson (born 22 September 1935). Wife of the triple murderer. Stabbed to death. She was divorced from Sten Fransson when the murders occurred in 1975, but they found their way back to each other after he was discharged from institutional psychiatric care.

== In the media ==
On 2 September 2022, the case was revisited in an episode of the podcast Svenska Mordhistorier.

On 28 November 2025, the case was revisited in episode 167 of the podcast Fallen jag aldrig glömmer.

== See also ==
- Mattias Flink – another officer who committed mass murder in Dalarna
- Matija Sovdat – triple murderer released after two years
- Roger Karlsson – triple murderer released after two years
