= Vattnäs =

- Location within Dalarna Location within Sweden
- Coordinates: 61°02′59″N 14°36′12″E
- Country: Sweden
- Province: Dalarna
- County: Dalarna County
- Municipality: Mora Municipality

Area
  - Total: 0.72 km^{2} (0.28 sq mi)

Population (31 December 2010)
  - Total: 294
  - Density: 407/km^{2} (1,050/sq mi)
- Time zone: UTC+1 (CET)
  - Summer (DST): UTC+2 (CEST)

Vattnäs is a locality situated in Mora Municipality, Dalarna County, Sweden with 294 inhabitants in 2010.

== See also ==
- 1975 Vattnäs murders
