= 2021 Eslöv school stabbing =

School stabbing in Eslöv, Sweden

Eslöv school stabbing
- Screenshot from the Twitch livestream.
- Location: 55°50′18″N 13°19′07″E; Källeberg School, Eslöv, Sweden
- Date: 19 August 2021
- Attack type: School attack; Stabbing; Attempted mass murder
- Weapons: Four knives (only one used); Two airsoft pistols (both unused)
- Deaths: 0
- Injuries: 1
- Perpetrator: Hugo Jackson
- Motive: Far-right extremism; Mental illness; Suicide by cop
- Verdict: Guilty; sentenced to 2.5 years in a youth detention centre and must pay damages
- Convictions: Attempted murder; Grossly unlawful threats

On 19 August 2021, a stabbing and attempted mass murder occurred at Källeberg School (Källebergsskolan) in Eslöv, Sweden, when 15-year-old Hugo Jackson stabbed a person with a knife before attempting to commit suicide by cop after aiming an airsoft pistol at first responders.

The perpetrator livestreamed the attack on live-streaming platform Twitch. There is no publicly available screen recording of the livestream; however, screenshots of the livestream exist.

== Background ==
Sweden and wider Scandinavia have had a history of right-wing extremism, including a stabbing attack at a school in Trollhättan, Sweden in 2015. Often these attacks are influenced by a discontent with immigration policies and will target immigrants and minority ethnic groups.

The livestreaming of right-wing terrorist attacks online, thought to have been first used and popularised in the Christchurch mosque shootings, have become increasingly utilised.

== Attack ==
At around 8:06 a.m., the perpetrator arrived at Källeberg, at the school's football pitch, carrying a gym bag that contained four knives, two airsoft pistols, black clothing, a protective vest and combat helmet both adorned with patches of the Swedish flag. After using one of the school's changing rooms to put on his clothing, He began a livestream on Twitch using his mobile phone, propping it up to broadcast.

At points in time, the perpetrator was actively sending text messages to his father during the attack, the last one at 8:34 a.m.

Upon starting the livestream, the perpetrator begins playing Serbia Strong and says "Remember lads, subscribe to PewDiePie", referencing a quote originating from the perpetrator of the Christchurch mosque shootings.

Three to four minutes into the livestream, he walks in circles and then squats down in front of the camera and gives a double thumbs-up to the camera and then attaches the phone to the GoPro mount on his helmet and proceeds approaching Källeberg.

Eight minutes and eleven seconds into the livestream, he enters Källeberg. He approaches Niklas Videsson, a 45-year-old teacher, who remarks the clothing of the perpetrator, saying "I see you are wearing an entire uniform." He stabs Videsson in the stomach, making him collapse onto the ground and shout in pain.

Fifteen minutes and forty-eight seconds into the livestream, the music has changed to "Don't Stop Me Now" by Queen, and the perpetrator begins walking back to the football pitch before being detained by police officer, Mikael Johansson, who orders him to lie down. He aims his airsoft pistol at officer Johansson reminiscent of an attempt at suicide by cop. Johansson fires warning shots at him, the weapon is dropped, he is put into handcuffs and arrested whilst music continues playing.

For the remaining four minutes and thirty-three seconds of the livestream, the video stream cuts off but audio can still be heard that the perpetrator tells the officer that he has had enough of life and wants to be shot, the livestream then ends; 25 minutes and 36 seconds in duration.

== Perpetrator ==
The perpetrator was identified as 15-year-old Hugo Jackson. According to police, the perpetrator had an interest in white supremacy, national socialism, school shootings and instances of right-wing terrorism.

The perpetrator had been reported to, questioned and visited by police several times in the year leading up to the attack. In almost every instance the police forwarded the case to social services. Teachers at school expressed frustration at the inaction of social services to the police, having voiced concerns about the perpetrator bringing knives to school and believing he could harm someone at school. Among the officers these concerns were expressed to included an officer who had previously witnessed the perpetrator wearing a swastika arm band and knew the perpetrator had pictures of school shooters and Nazi imagery in his possession.

On 6 August 2021, Swedish authorities received a tip from the FBI entailing that an individual had made plans to commit a school shooting in Sweden, which was traced to the perpetrator. Four police officers visited the perpetrator at his home for questioning. No action was taken against the perpetrator, instead another report was filed to social services.

While he was imprisoned, he had some level of media access, and was reported to celebrate school shootings and similar attacks as they were actively happening across the world.

=== Kristianstad school stabbing ===
On 10 January 2022, a 16-year-old student attacked his school in Kristianstad, Sweden, armed with four knives, injuring two people. The perpetrator in that case and of this case were in close contact with each other and communicated through online communication. According to the Eslöv school stabbing perpetrator, the two were "blood brothers". They had met on the online video game Roblox and had been friends for around six years, communicating through various social media platforms and meeting in person four or five times.

The Kristianstad stabbing perpetrator told police that they would discuss and joke about topics like politics, racism and the Christchurch mosque shootings livestream. These discussions between him and the police occurred prior to the Kristianstad school attack and were part of the investigation into the Eslöv attack. The extent of the knowledge the Kristianstad attacker had of the Eslöv attacker's plans or if he aided him at all is unclear. He was sentenced to three years in a youth detention.

== Legal proceedings ==
On 22 December 2021, the Lund District Court sentenced the perpetrator to two and a half years in a youth detention center after being found guilty of attempted murder and nine counts of grossly unlawful threats. He was ordered to pay at least SEK 480,000 ($52,582) to victims.

On 16 March 2022, the perpetrator was convicted for a further four charges of grossly unlawful threats. His sentence remained the same, though he was ordered to pay additional damages.

== See also ==
- Malmö school stabbing
- Trollhättan school stabbing
- Christchurch mosque shootings
- 2011 Norway attacks
- Livestreamed crime
