= Swedish for immigrants =

National free Swedish language course

Expenses of publicly funded SFI, million 10^{6} krona. (red: Swedish National Agency for Education, grey: Municipalities etc)
Source: Swedish National Agency for Education (red) 2011, 2012, 2013, 2014, 2015, 2016 Municipalities & private organisers, Statistics Sweden (grey) No SCB Data for municipalities prior to 2014.

Swedish for immigrants (Swedish: svenska för invandrare), abbreviated as SFI (Swedish: sfi), is the national free Swedish language course offered to most categories of immigrants. Immigrants who speak Danish or Norwegian are ineligible for free Swedish tuition through SFI. All other persons who have emigrated to Sweden are entitled by law to Swedish language education.

SFI is directed towards people who lack basic knowledge in Swedish and are of the minimum age of sixteen. As a significant proportion of immigrants arriving in Sweden are illiterate, certain courses also teach how to read, write, and tell the time using the hands of a clock. The training is paid for by the municipality (local authority) in which the immigrant lives, and applications to take the course are made to the municipality's adult education department (kommunens vuxenutbildning).

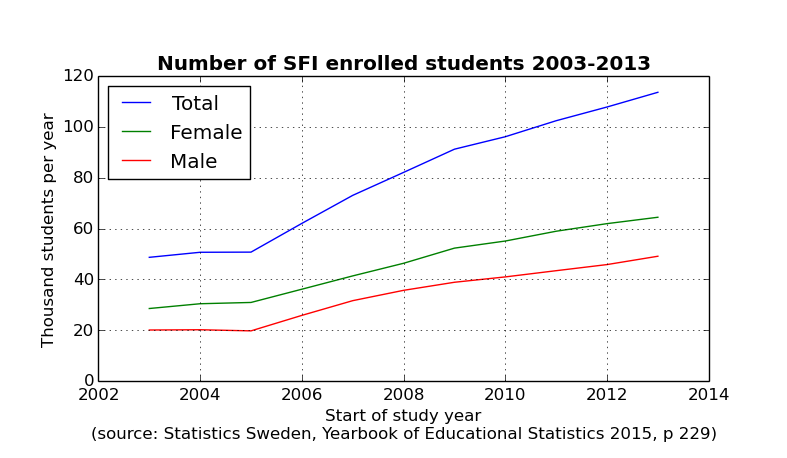
Statistics Sweden: SFI Total Female Male Students Enrolled 2003 2013, ISSN 1654-4447 p 229

According to the SFI and Vuxenutbildningen Luleå, the Swedish for immigrants program comprises three different tiers: Sfi 1, Sfi 2, and Sfi 3. Sfi 1 consists of the study courses A and B, which are aimed at pupils with little or no education and individuals who are illiterate. Sfi 2 includes the study courses B and C, which are earmarked for students who have undergone many years of schooling but are unfamiliar with the Latin script. Sfi 3 includes the study courses C and D, which are geared toward pupils with college education that are seeking further studies. As of 2007, according to the National Center for SFI and Sweden as Another Speech (NC) and the Institute for Sweden as Another Speech (ISA), a total of 137 foreign languages were spoken as mother tongues by students within the Swedish for immigrants program. Of these languages, the most common mother tongues of pupils within the Sfi 1 tier were Arabic (2,036), Thai (1,510), Somali (1,473), Kurdish/North Kurdish (1,150), Southern Kurdish (740), Turkish (650), Spanish (281), Bosnian/Croatian/Serbian (277), and Persian (273).

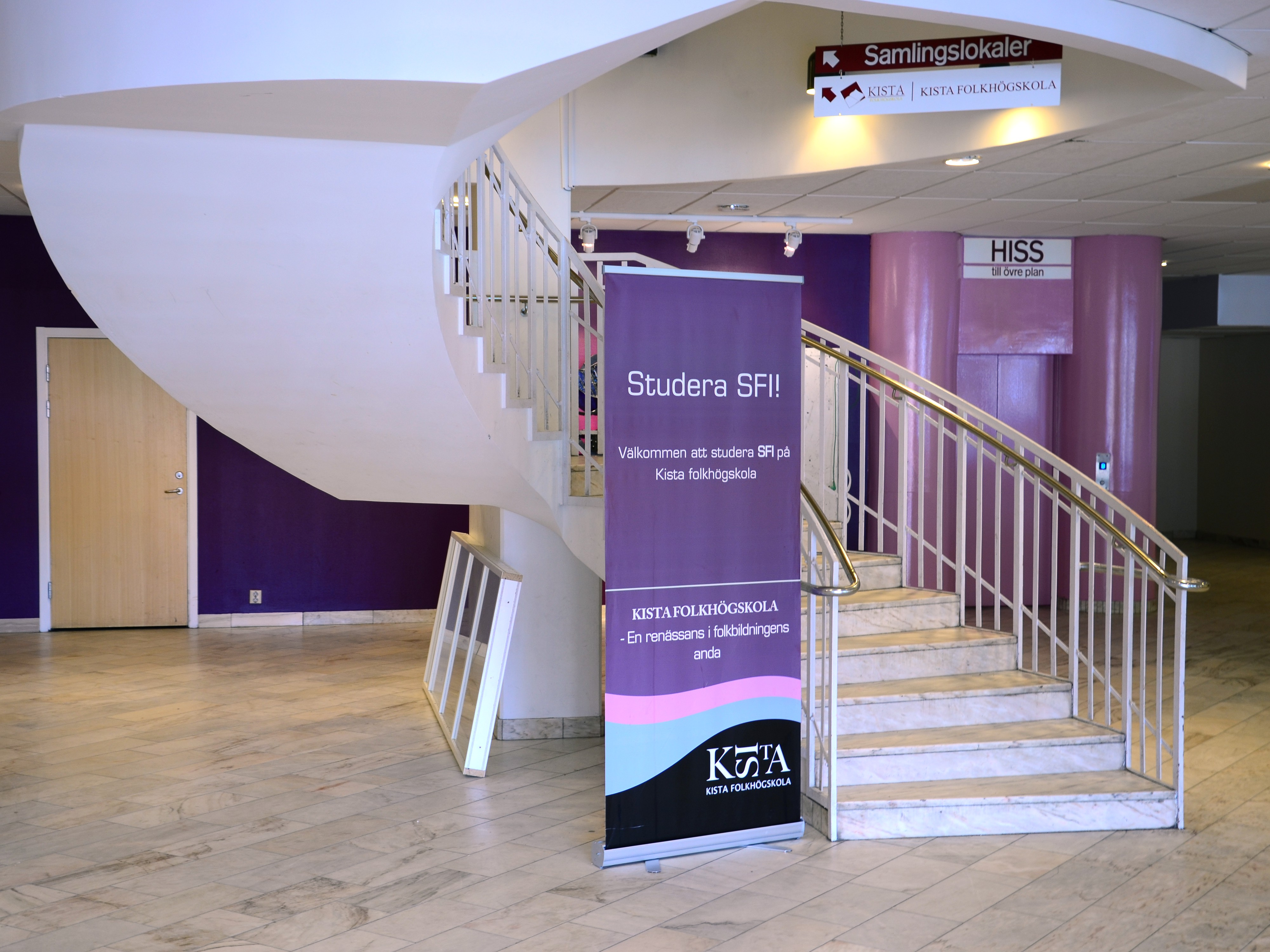
A signboard placed in front of an SFI school in Kista

In the five years leading up to 2012, the number of illiterate migrants doubled, they had fewer than three years to no schooling from their origin country. In 2011, about 19,200 migrants in the Swedish for immigrants program had 0–3 years of education. For instance in Borlänge, 4 out of 10 of those who completed the introduction for immigrants had no education at all, the majority being women.

According to Statistics Sweden, as of 2012, the most common countries of birth for pupils in the Swedish for immigrants program are Iraq (13,477), Somalia (10,355), Thailand (5,658), Poland (5,079), Iran (4,748), Turkey (3,344), China (3,408), Eritrea (3,618), Afghanistan (3,640), and Syria (3,257). The most common mother tongues spoken by the students are Arabic (18,886), Somali (10,525), Persian (7,162), Thai (5,707), Polish (5,100), English (4,796), Spanish (4,552), Tigrinya (3,623), Turkish (3,064), and North Kurdish (3,059). The SFI (kurs D) test is equivalent to stage B1 (Independent Speaker: Threshold or pre-intermediate) on the Common European Framework.
