= Kungälv school shooting =

1961 school shooting in Kungälv, Sweden

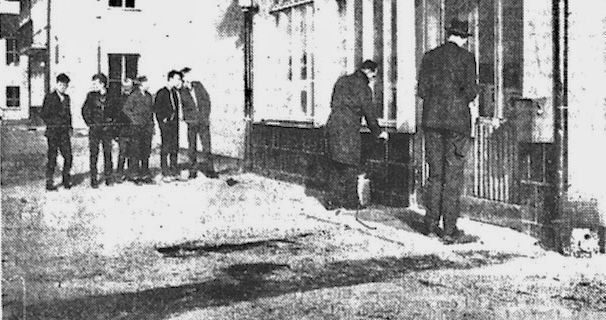
- Police technicians at the school a day after the shooting
- Location of the shooting
- Location: 57.8711°N 11.9726°E; Kungälv, Sweden
- Date: 4 March 1961 c. 11:30 (CET)
- Attack type: School shooting
- Weapon: 9mm Browning Hi-Power semi-automatic pistol
- Deaths: 1
- Injuries: 6
- Perpetrator: Ove Conry Andersson

The Kungälv school shooting occurred on 4 March 1961 at Kungälv School in central Kungälv, Västra Götaland, Sweden, in which a gunman shot and killed one person, Per Håkan Altvall, and injured six others. It was the first reported school shooting in Sweden and one of the earliest in Europe.

The memory of the murdered Per Håkan Altvall is kept alive in Kungälv via a stipend "awarded annually to one or a number of students known for good friendship and social support to students".

== Incident ==
Around 11:30 p.m. on 4 March 1961, a large group of youngsters were dancing in the school gym hall. During the last dance, 17-year-old Ove Conry Andersson entered, pulled out a gun and started shooting randomly. People attempted to hide under chairs and behind a piano. Seven were wounded, including 18-year-old Per Håkan Altvall, who later died from his wounds. He was hit in the stomach and an eyewitness states that the perpetrator first shot Altvall in the leg and later on his way out shot him again in the stomach, killing him. The wounded were first taken to a classroom in the school and later to Kungälv hospital.

Kungälv police chased the gunman all night on the road to Ytterby, where it was assumed he had escaped. Kungälv police requested assistance from police in both Ytterby and Gothenburg. The following morning, 5 March, just before 8 a.m., the killer showed up at the police station, driven there by an older coworker. A few hours later, the 17-year-old gunman had willingly told the police all his details of the incident. The shooter had been to a different party earlier and drank two mixed drinks, then watched an ice hockey game while drinking cognac with a friend. At 10.30 p.m. he first entered the school dance and got into a fight with a guest who was also an amateur boxer. Andersson then went to get his gun, came back and started shooting, killing Altvall before escaping and hiding in the Fontin forest. The chase for Andersson was the largest police activity in west Sweden to date, involving a total of 50 policemen plus dogs.

On March 6, all of the school gathered in the gym hall in memory of Per Altvall.

== Perpetrator ==
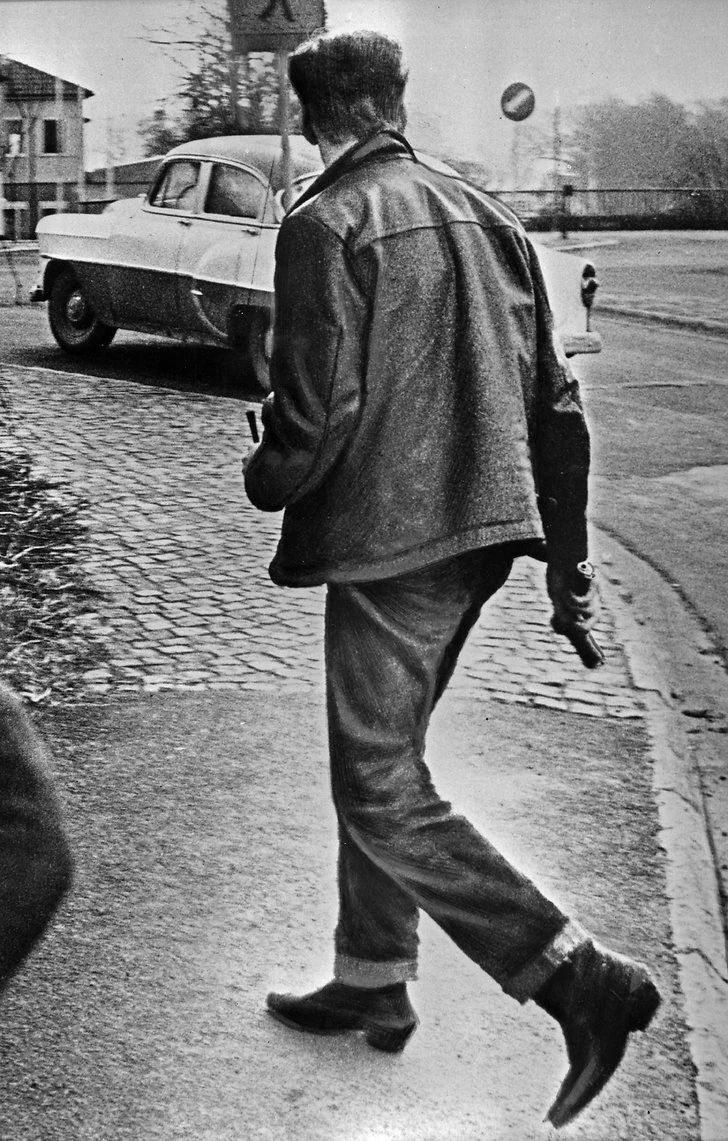
Andersson turning himself in at a police station the morning after the attack, holding the pistol used in the shooting.

Ove Conry Andersson, born 23 September 1943, was known in Kungälv for his interest in cowboy movies and told the police he wanted to be like heroes in the movies. This event led to the first proposal to the government to investigate the effects of media violence, and the then-popular radio show Tidsspegeln ("Mirror of Time") held a debate about "ideals and heroes for the youth" with the headline "Can we blame Cartwrights".

A 1995 article in Swedish newspaper Dagens Nyheter reported that Andersson was considered mentally unbalanced, partly because of the effects of alcohol, at the time of the shooting, and sentenced to closed psychiatric treatment. He refused to comment but DN mentioned that "it is known that he had married and had children less than four years after the incident." Altvall's mother Essie, then 88, was also interviewed and mentioned that she reached out to Andersson's mother shortly after the shooting and had forgiven the shooter for the murder of her son.

Andersson committed suicide on 12 August 2008.

== Legacy ==
In 1979, the Kungälv-based dance band Streaplers released a cover, "Jag hatar måndan", of the Boomtown Rats song "I Don't Like Mondays". The song is about the Cleveland Elementary School shooting and is sung by the band's drummer Bjarne Lundqvist, who is the same age as Andersson.

In 2024, the artist Marcus Berggren, who grew up in Kungälv, released the album Intresse för Cowboyliv (transl. Interest in Cowboy life). He states that the album title is a quote from Andersson.

Altvall's sister Halldora, a doctor who was active in Save the Children, told SVT in 2025 that what happened to her brother became a driving force in her life..

In the same year, Associate Professor in Criminology at Borås University College, Charlotta Thodelius, compared the discussion about cowboy films as a cause with the discussions about violent films and other media after the school shooting in Columbine in 1999. Thodelius also compared the act to the school shooting in Örebro in 2025 insofar as both perpetrators "stayed under the radar" and were not noticed before the act. In the podcast Kriminologerna from February 2025, she goes through risk factors for school shootings and shows how most or all of them tuned in to Andersson.

== See also ==
- List of school-related attacks
