= List of investigative journalists =

This is a list of investigative journalists. Only a small proportion of journalism consists of investigative journalism. However, the few who practice it can have a disproportionately large effect when their work brings attention to matters people care about but are unaware of.

== Practicing investigative journalists ==
This is a partial list. As of 2024, the Global Investigative Journalism Network currently has 249 members (most or all of which are networks or outlets serving multiple journalists), and Investigative Reporters and Editors has over 4,500 members practicing in the US and around the world. As of April 2025, the International Consortium of Investigative Journalists had almost 300 members.

- Hayatte Abdou – Comorian journalist
- Maura Ajak (born 1989) – South Sudanese journalist, broadcaster and camerawoman
- Yevgenia Albats – Russian journalist
- Roman Anin – Russian journalist
- Justin Arenstein – South African journalist
- Edik Baghdasaryan – Armenian journalist
- James Ball – British journalist
- Carl Bernstein (born 1944) – American journalist most famous for reporting on the Watergate scandal at the Washington Post
- Fredrik Laurin – Swedish journalist
- Sven Bergman – Swedish journalist
- Linton Besser – Australian journalist
- Uri Blau – Israeli journalist
- Duncan Campbell – British journalist
- Carlos Fernando Chamorro – Nicaraguan journalist
- Umar Cheema – Pakistani journalist
- Hopewell Chin'ono (born 1971) — Zimbabwean journalist whose reporting on corruption in Zimbabwe became internationally known when he was imprisoned for 45 days for it in 2020.
- Alfredo Corchado – Corchado journalist
- Sheila Coronel – Filipino journalist
- Ross Coulthart – Australian journalist
- Bill Dedman – American journalist
- Alexenia Dimitrova – Bulgarian journalist
- Joachim Dyfvermark – Swedish journalist
- Emmanuel K. Dogbevi – Ghanaian journalist
- Steven Gan – Malaysian journalist
- Frank Garbely – Swiss journalist
- Ignacio Gómez – Chilean journalist
- Mónica_González – Chilean journalist
- Florence George Graves – US journalist
- Stephen Grey – British journalist
- Nicky Hager – New Zealand journalist
- Seymour Hersh (born 1937) – American investigative journalist and political writer
- Tessy Igomu – Nigerian journalist and head of Investigation at The Punch newspaper
- Khadija Ismayilova – Azerbaijani journalist
- David Kaplan – US journalist
- Yusuf Jameel – Indian journalist
- Charles Lewis – US journalist
- Paul Lewis – British journalist
- Bill Kovach – US journalist
- Hans Leyendecker – German journalist
- Gustavo Gorriti – Peruvian journalist
- Daniel Kalinaki – Ugandan journalist
- Thomas Maier – US journalist
- Yossi Melman – Israeli journalist
- John-Allan Namu – Kenyan journalist
- Matthew Nippert – New Zealand journalist
- Jenny Nordberg – Swedish journalist
- Bastian Obermayer – German journalist
- Frederik Obermaier – German journalist
- Miranda Patrucić – Bosnian journalist
- Jacques Pauw – South African journalist
- Ahmed Rashid – Pakistani journalist
- Mabel Rehnfeldt – Paraguay journalist
- Maria Ressa – Filipino journalist
- Gerardo_Reyes_ – Colombian journalist
- Sam Sole – South African journalist
- María Teresa Ronderos – Colombian journalist
- Giannina Segnini – Costa Rican journalist
- Pelin Unker – Turkish journalist
- Horacio Verbitsky – Argentinian journalist
- Marites D. Vitug – Filipino journalist
- Alejandra Xanic von Bertrab Wilhelm – Mexican journalist
- Marian Wilkinson – Australian journalist
- Margot Williams – US journalist
- Paul Williams – Irish journalist
- Bob Woodward (born 1943) – American journalist most famous for reporting on the Watergate scandal at the Washington Post, (where he is now associate editor)

== Deceased or retired investigative journalists ==
- Ida B. Wells (1862–1931) – investigative journalist and reformer, noted for investigating lynching in the United States
- I.F. Stone (1907–1989) – also the publisher of I.F. Stone's Weekly
- Ida Tarbell
- Paul Y. Anderson (1893–1938) – winner of Pulitzer Prize 1929
- C. P. Connolly (1863–1935) – radical investigative journalist associated for many years with Collier's Weekly
- Julius Chambers (1850–1920) — most famous for getting himself committed to an insane asylum, to be able to report from within, which led to changes both organizational and legal changes
- Nellie Bly
- Upton Sinclair
- Pete Carey – US journalist
- David Leigh – British journalist
- Gwen Lister – Namibian journalist
- David May, English journalist.
- Goenawan Mohamad – Indonesian journalist
- Charles Onyango-Obbo – Ugandan journalist
- Gary Webb - American journalist (1955 - 2004)
- Peter R._de_Vries - Dutch journalist (1956-2021)
