= Sven Bergman =

Swedish journalist

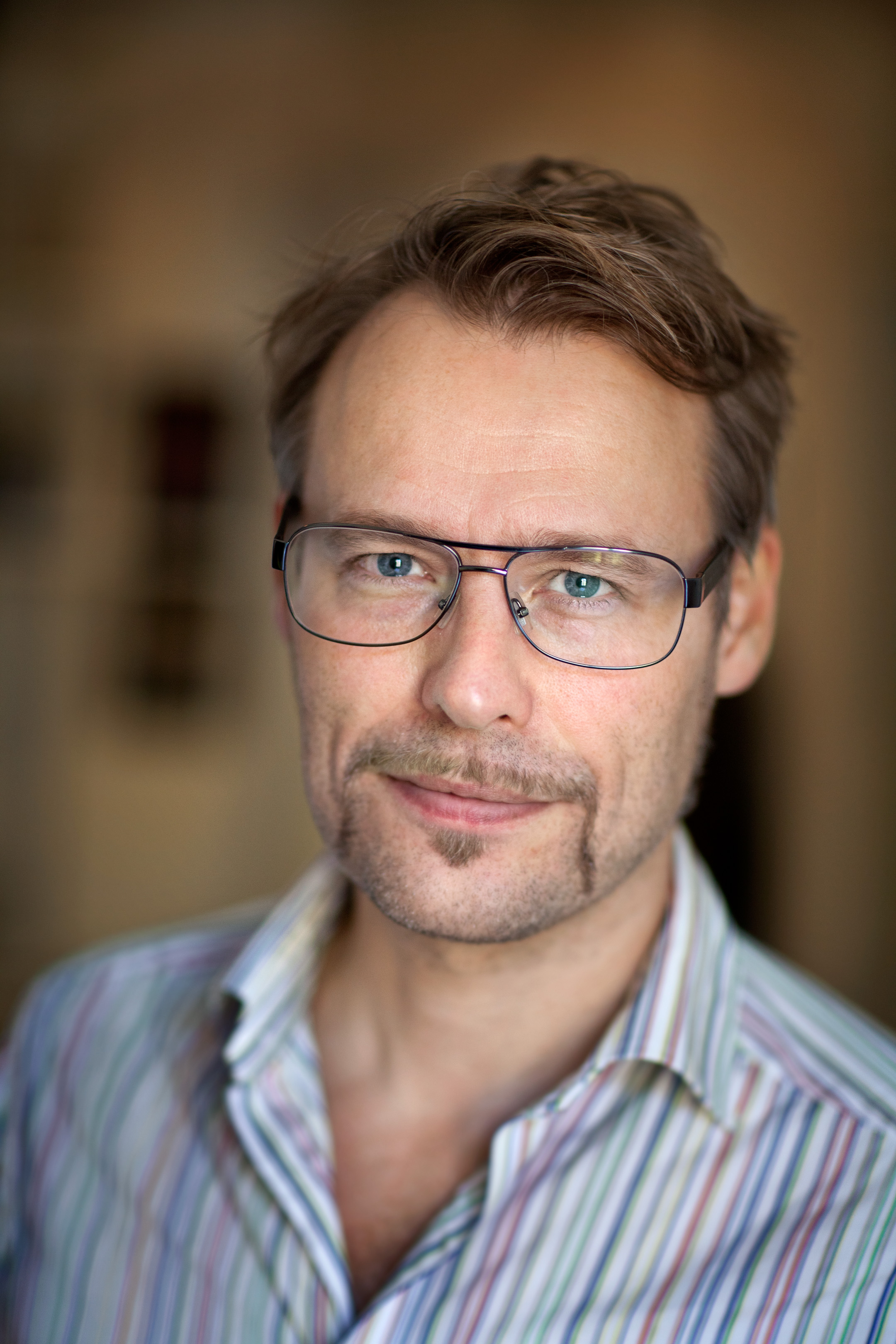
Sven Bergman in 2013

Sven Bergman (born 12 November 1967) is a Swedish investigative reporter/producer for the current affairs show Uppdrag granskning on Sveriges Television.

He works in a team with Fredrik Laurin and Joachim Dyfvermark.

The trio has specialized in global investigative journalism, and often cooperates with fellow journalists around the world.

For their stories the trio has been awarded numerous international awards, such as the ICIJ Daniel Pearl Award from Daniel Pearl Foundation, Edward R Murrow Award, Overseas Press Clubs Eric and Amy Burger Award and Prix Circom. Together with his team partners Bergman is the only journalist who has been awarded three times with the most prestigious Swedish award: Stora journalistpriset (2013, 2007, 2005).

Sven Bergman is a member to the International Consortium of Investigative Journalists, ICIJ. A global network of 185 investigative journalists in more than 65 countries who collaborate on in-depth investigative stories.

== Extraordinary rendition ==
They reported on the secret deportation of two Egyptians in what was one of the first operations known as extraordinary rendition. The two men, Ahmed Agiza and Muhammed al-Zery, were taken from Bromma airport in Sweden in December 2001 to Egypt in a covert operation by US agents and handed over to Egyptian security services and were subsequently tortured. The story caused a major uproar in Sweden, drew international attention and was one of the first to shed light on "Extraordinary Rendition". The plane uncovered in the report as the one used in the rendition was a US registered Gulfstream V with the registration number N379P. It was found by the reporters, and their partners in the reporting like UK-reporter Stephen Grey to be part of a much larger fleet of planes used for rendition operations.

In September 2008, Bergman and his colleagues received the ICIJ Daniel Perl award for their 2006 report in National TV4 "The Illegal Cod" on the illegal fishing in the Barents Sea. and in November 2009 were appointed Environmental journalist of the year for "Pink Gold" on the (un-)sustainable farming of salmon.

In 2013, the trio started publishing a story on the state owned Swedish Telecom giant Telia Sonera. In April 2014 a one-hour documentary could expose how the company cooperated with oppressive regimes in a business region the company called "Eurasia" that included long time dictatorships like Uzbekistan and Azerbadjan. In September 2016 the first reportage on how the company also bribed their way to these markets was published which after several subsequent reports led to the resignation of the company's CEO Lars Nyberg (2013) and the board. In 2015 Telia Sonera declared that it was selling all its assets in "Eurasia" – and the loss to the biggest owner – the Swedish state – was estimated at 20 BN SEK Dagens Industry. The recipient of Telia Soneras payments for Uzbek licenses, Gulnara Karimova the daughter to the long time dictator Islam Karimov, was deposed by her father because of the international scandal following the publication. In 2013 the trio was awarded another "Guldspaden" by Swedish Investigative Editors and Reporters and with a third "Stora Journalistpriset" Stora journalistpriset for their reporting on Telia Sonera.

== Filmography ==
- 2012 "The Snowden documents" – on the relationship between the NSA and Swedish FRA.
- 2012: "The Uzbek affair" – Nordic Telecom Teliasonera's bribery scandal with the regime (Gulnara Karimova) in Uzbekistan.
- 2012: "The Black Boxes" – on how the Swedish-Finnish state owned telco Teliasonera cooperates with countries like Uzbekistan and Belarus in providing them access to their mobile telephone systems.
- 2011: "The letter from Mubarak" – on the legacy of the Swedish-Egyptian security collaboration, and first-ever interviews with Ahmed Agiza and Muhammed Alzery.
- 2010: "Euroorphans – the children left behind" – investigative documentary about the hundreds of thousands of children in former East Europe growing up without their parents, who are in Western Europe as migrant workers to sustain the children in their home countries.
- 2010: "In secret" – Secret military intelligence reports about suspected Russian dumping of radioactive material and chemical agents in the Baltic Sea. Uppdrag granskning SVT.
- 2009: "The suspects" – Swedish citizen suspected of terrorist crimes in Pakistan. Uppdrag granskning SVT.
- 2009: "The last battle" – Investigating the investigations regarding systematic bribes in the JAS 39 Gripen campaign. Uppdrag granskning SVT.
- 2009: "The pink gold" – How farmed salmon is emptying the oceans.
- 2008: "The Facade" – The Scientology front organizations. Uppdrag granskning SVT.
- 2008: "Josephs fate" – covered up torture in the Kongo under EU and UN flag.
- 2007: "Gripen – the secret deals", a series of documentaries revealing how Swedish SAAB and British BAE Systems bribed their way selling Swedish Jetfighter Gripen to The Czech Republic, Hungary and South Africa.
- 2006: "The Illegal Cod", how mafia-controlled fisheries in Barents Sea ends up filling European supermarkets with illegal cod. Kalla fakta TV4.
- 2005: "The Broken Promise" part 5
- 2004: "The broken promise" part 1,2,3 and 4 Investigative programme. Swedish TV4. A series revealing the politics behind the deportation of two terror-suspected Egyptian men, conducted by American agents on Swedish ground.
- 2003: "The Swedish Bastard" (Svensjäveln). Documentary. About reindeer keeper Lars-Anders Gillenbjörk and Swedish politics on wild predators.
- 2003: "The network". Investigative programme. Swedish TV4. A series alleging corruption in the Swedish State Monopoly on Alcohol.
- 2002/2003: "The Black Sea". Investigative programme. Swedish TV4. A series regarding illegal fishing and selling of cod in the Baltic Sea.
- 2002/2003: "Happiness for sale". Investigative programme. Swedish TV4. A series regarding the methods used by international company Landmark Education.
- 2002: "The Swede at Guantanamo Bay". Documentary. Swedish TV4. About the Swede Mehdi Muhammed Gehzali who was arrested on the border of Afghanistan and Pakistan in December 2001 and detained on the American military base at Guantanamo Bay, Cuba.
- 2002: "Get rid of everything". Investigative programme. Swedish TV4. A review on how the Swedish military throw away a lot of their material, even the new stuff.
- 2002: "The companies' doctors". Investigative programme. Swedish TV4. A series investigating the agenda and money between the insurance companies and the doctors who decide if injured insurance takers shall be given compensation.
- 2001: "The hidden price of contraceptive pills". Investigative programme. Swedish TV4. A series regarding the side-effects of third generation contraceptive pills, alleging that international medical companies have covered up their own research showing these serious side-effects.
- 2001: "Code 42". Investigative programme. Swedish TV4. A series on abuse of animals in Swedish slaughterhouses.
- 2000: "12 crowns per hour". Investigative programme. Swedish TV4. Treatment of immigrants by Swedish companies.
- 2000: "The only truth". Investigative programme. Swedish TV4. A review on the side-effects of child vaccines, and how big international vaccine companies in secret pay off families whose children have been damaged by side-effects.
- 2000: "Expedition Estonia". Investigative programme. Swedish TV4. A review on the illegal diving expedition to the wreck of Estonia, and the conspiracy -theories of why the ship sunk in 1994.
- 1999: "The smuggling of alcohol". Documentary. Swedish TV4. Two hour-long documentaries about organized smuggling of spirits to Sweden, corruption in the Custom Authority and the consequences among the teenagers drinking the black spirit.
- 1998: "The land of little resistance". Investigative programme. Swedish TV4. A series revealing the secret operations by the international Scientology fighting all critics trying to make the most secret text of Scientology an official document.

== Awards ==
- 2013 Stora journalistpriset for "Årets avslöjande" (with Joachim Dyfvermark and Fredrik Laurin), Uppdrag granskning, SVT for "Telia Sonera: The Black Boxes and The Uzbek affair"
- 2013 Daniel Pearl Award (with Joachim Dyfvermark and Fredrik Laurin) for "Telia Sonera: The Black Boxes and The Uzbek affair"
- 2013 Kristallen for best investigating reportage, uncovering of Telegiant TeliaSoneras secret cooperation with security services in dictatorships in Eurasia.
- 2013 Prix Circom (with Joachim Dyfvermark and Fredrik Laurin) for "Telia Sonera: The Black Boxes and The Uzbek affair"
- 2013 Guldspaden (with Joachim Dyfvermark and Fredrik Laurin) for "Telia Sonera: The Black Boxes and The Uzbek affair"
- 2009 Environmental Journalist of the year (with Joachim Dyfvermark and Fredrik Laurin) for "Pink Gold" – on the down-sides of the gigant salmonfarming industry.
- 2008 Daniel Pearl Award (with Joachim Dyfvermark and Fredrik Laurin) for "Den svarta torsken", a story of the illegal international cod trade.
- 2008 Edward R Murrow Award (with Joachim Dyfvermark and Fredrik Laurin) for "Gripen – the secret deals", a series of reports on the bribery in the sale of the Swedish jet-fighter Gripen to the Czech Republic, Hungary and South Africa.
- 2007 Investigative Reporters and Editors finalist
- 2007 Stora journalistpriset for "Årets avslöjande" (with Joachim Dyfvermark and Fredrik Laurin), Uppdrag granskning, SVT for "Gripen – the secret deals"
- 2005 Stora journalistpriset for "Årets avslöjande" (with Joachim Dyfvermark and Fredrik Laurin), Kalla fakta, TV4 for "the broken promise"
- 2005 Special citation award by ICIJ, The Center for Public Integrity (Bergman, Dyfvermark & Laurin) for "The Broken Promise".
- 2005 Publicistklubbens stora pris (with Joachim Dyfvermark and Fredrik Laurin), Kalla fakta, TV4 för "The broken promise"
- 2004 Overseas Press Clubs Eric and Amy Burger Award (with Joachim Dyfvermark and Fredrik Laurin), Kalla fakta, TV4 for "The broken promise"
- 2004 Guldspaden (with Joachim Dyfvermark and Fredrik Laurin) for "The broken promise" i Kalla fakta, TV4.
- 2004 Edward R Murrow Award (with Joachim Dyfvermark and Fredrik Laurin) for "The broken promise"
- 2004 Vilhelm Moberg-stipendiet by newsmagazine Arbetaren (Bergman, Dyfvermark & Laurin) for "The Broken Promise" i Kalla fakta, TV4.
- 2003 Hedersomnämnande Guldspaden bribes in state liquor monopoly Systembolaget.
