= Fredrik Laurin =

Swedish journalist

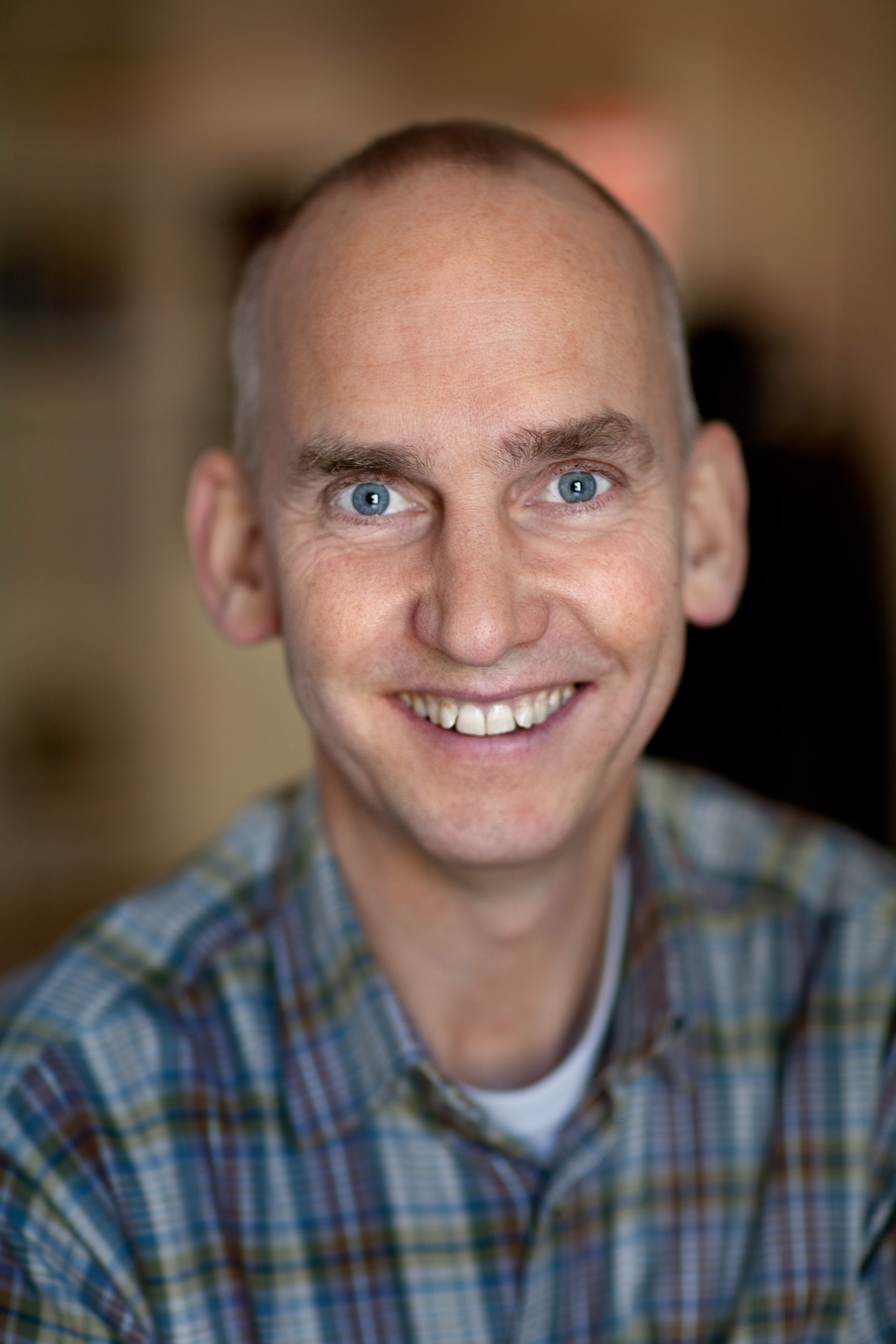
Fredrik Laurin

Fredrik Laurin (born 4 March 1964) is a Swedish investigative journalist.

== Biography ==
Fredrik Laurin has been working as a journalist since 1989. His most recent assignment was Special projects Editor contributing to Sweden's main investigative programme "Uppdrag granskning" (Mission Investigate) and the investigative desk at SVT Nyheterna (News department).

During fourteen years from 2000 he was part of a team, "Trojkan" with Sven Bergman and Joachim Dyfvermark. and was since 2006 working with them as an investigative reporter/producer for "Uppdrag granskning" at Swedish Television.

Before that as investigative researcher/reporter/producer for the current affairs show "Kalla Fakta" ("Cold Facts") Swedish National TV4 and earlier at the Swedish News Agency TT, the Current Affairs Show "Striptease" on Swedish Television, SVT, and the media newspaper "Resumé".

In 2014, Fredrik Laurin took over as head of the investigative team at Swedish Radio, SR Ekot, but was 1,5 years later headhunted back to SVT as Special Projects Editor.

He lectures on investigative journalism techniques in courses organized, among others, by the Swedish Investigative Reporters and Editors "Grävande Journalister", the Global Investigative Journalism Conferences, GIJN, ARIJ seminars and at the Universities of Stockholm and Gothenburg's School of Journalism.

In 2018: He was editor of Swedish Televisions "Faktakollen" - a fact checking site in 2018- until leaving for a Knight Wallace Fellowship at University of Michigan.

He's a member of the International Consortium of Investigative Reporters, ICIJ, between 2017 and 2022 on the organizations Network committee responsible for selecting new members.

== Reporting ==
Telecom giant and 5G market leader Ericsson had a lot of business in post Saddam-Iraq. Also under ISIS rule of N Iraq. A whistleblower came forward to ICIJ and shared an internal report on the company's dealings with ISIS. Laurin put together a team of reporters at SVT Uppdrag granskning and thoroughly investigated the findings in the report and reported on the issues uncovered together with colleagues at ICIJ. In February 2022, the story broke and Ericssons stock plunged 30% on the news that the company had dealings with ISIS. A criminal investigation in Sweden followed and several lawsuits have been started. The board of directors at Ericsson subsequently lost a vote of no confidence at the AGM.

When DR in 2021 disclosed that NSA spied on Swedish politicians and defence industry from their base in Amager, Copenhagen they reached out and Laurin and SVT joined in. This breech of loyalty was exposed in a joint investigation with DR who managed to source the top-secret information. Swedish defence minister Peter Hultqvist awkwardly denounced the intrusion in an interview with SVT's Agenda

In November 2019, incredulous statements on Chinese camps in Xinjiang on hidden camera abouth Uighurs "being illiterate" exposed the moral standing of senior management at Huawei Sweden. The segment was aired during SVT's collaboration with ICIJ on Chinacables. In 2022, Laurin was engaged in the follow-up on China Cables a project led by Adrian Zens called "The Xinjiang Police Files".

In 2013, "Trojkan" was the only Swedish journalist to access the Snowden documents and could expose the intimate relations between the eavesdropping agencies Swedish FRA and US NSA. He has been part of several ICIJ projects such as Looting the Seas, Offshoreleaks, Swissleaks, Luxleaks, Panama and Paradisepapers.

"Trojkan" also uncovered in several reports for SVT in 2012 how the daughter of Uzbek dictator Islam Karimov, Gulnara Karimova, was bribed by the Swedish Telecom giant Telia Sonera. Gulnara Karimova was subsequently jailed after admitting to bribery the company paid one of the highest fines ever in history to the US Securities and Exchange Commission.

In April 2012, a one-hour documentary exposed how the company cooperated with oppressive regimes in a business region the company called "Eurasia" that included long-time dictatorships like Uzbekistan and Azerbaijan. In September 2012, the first report on how the company also bribed their way to these markets was published, which after several subsequent reports, led to the resignation of the company's CEO Lars Nyberg (2013) and the board. In 2015, Telia Sonera declared that it was selling all its assets in "Eurasia"; and the loss to the biggest owner – the Swedish state – was estimated at 20 BN SEK Dagens Industri. The recipient of Telia Soneras payments for the Uzbek licenses, Gulnara Karimova, was deposed by her father, the long time dictator Islam Karimov because of the international scandal following the publication and after her father's death sentenced for corruption. In 2013, the trio was awarded another "Guldspaden" by Swedish investigative editors and reporters and with a third "Stora journalistpriset" for their reporting on Telia Sonera.

Swedish Television and "Trojkan" have also exposed how a French colonel in charge of joint UN-EU operation Operation Artemis in the Congo in 2003 personally took part in torture of a prisoner in front of Swedish fellow officers. In spite of both Swedish and French military investigations, Colonel Christophe Rastouil was never charged and instead made head of the covert action division (2004–2007) of the DGSE.

In 2005, the team were rewarded with a number of awards, among them awards from the Overseas Press Club of America, RTNDA:s Edward R Murrow award and the Stora Journalistpriset Stora Journalistpriset (Swedish equivalent to the Pulitzer Prize) as well as the Swedish Investigative Reporters and Editors award "Guldspaden" for their reporting on the secret deportation of two Egyptians in what was one of the first operations known as "Extraordinary rendition".

The two men, Ahmed Agiza and Muhammed Al Zery, were taken from Bromma airport in Sweden in December 2001 to Egypt in a covert operation by US agents and handed over to Egyptian security services and were subsequently tortured. The story caused a major uproar in Sweden, drew international attention and was one of the first to shed light on "Extraordinary Rendition". The plane uncovered in the report as the one used in the rendition was a US registered Gulfstream V with the registration number N379P. It was found by the reporters, and their partners in the reporting like UK-reporter Stephen Grey. to be part of a much larger fleet of planes used for rendition operations.

Fredrik Laurin and his colleagues also received several awards, among them a second "Stora Journalistpriset", for their 2007 report on the bribery in the sale of the Swedish jet-fighter Gripen to the Czech Republic, Hungary and South Africa.

In September 2008, they received the ICIJ Daniel Perl award for their 2006 report in National TV4 "The Illegal Cod" on the illegal fishing in the Barents Sea. and in November 2009 were appointed Environmental journalist of the year for "Pink Gold" on the (un-)sustainable farming of salmon.

In August 2006, Fredrik Laurin and Joachim Dyfvermark were awarded the Norwegian "Breiflabb-price" for the reports "The Illegal Cod". The price is given to journalists who in their professional work has contributed to a positive development of the fishing industry.

In addition, the trio was in 2003 awarded the Swedish Investigative Journalists Price of Honour together with Fredrik Lundberg for a story uncovering a huge corruption scandal in "Systembolaget" (the Swedish State Monopoly on Alcohol). Fredrik Laurin was together with Leif Holmkvist awarded the Swedish Investigative Reporters and Editors award "Guldspaden" 2000, for the revelation of bribes in the Swedish campaign for the summer Olympic Games 2004.

== Articles ==
- 2010–2012: (part of the team that produced) International Consortium of Investigative Journalists reports on Looting the Seas on bluefin tuna, jack mackerels, and Spain's role in overfishing.
- 2009: "In deep waters" - Filter - on overfishing in the world and a Swedish businessman's role in that.
- 2010: "Bluefin tuna - Looting the Seas" - an ICIJ investigation into how the bluefin tuna is being overfished and the control systems are flawed. Laurin initiated the project and was an advising editor. In 2011, the report received the Investigative Reporters and Editors (IRE) Tom Renner award.
- 2011: "Spain - Looting the Seas" - an ICIJ investigation into how Spain is the biggest receiver of fish-industry subsidies while at the same time being the biggest offender. Laurin advised and text-edited on the project.

== Filmography ==
- 2022 Produced the report "Ericsson and ISIS" " - a SVT current affairs' report on Swedish Telecom giant Ericssons dealings with the terrorsect ISIS in Iraq and Syria. In collaboration with ICIJ and 100 colleagues at 30 newsrooms all over the world. With research assistance from MIJ JMG University of Gothenburg.
- 2021 Produced the research for "The Stolen Children" - a SVT story on Sweden's history as one of the main adoption friendly countries in the world. With research assistance from

MIJ JMG University of Gothenburg

- 2020 Collaborated in Forbidden Stories "The Cartel Project - Regina Martinez death"
- 2017 "Paradisläckan" Laurin, Bergman and the photographer Ola Christoffersson did the Russian parts of the exposure of the American secretary of trade, Wilbur Ross, business deals with Russian oligarchs in the ICIJ-project Paradise papers.
- 2016 "The Swedes in the Paris attack" In cooperation with German ARD Uppdrag granskning published the Swedish connections to the Paris terror attacks in 2015.
- 2016 "Panamapapers" Uppdrag granskning could as the only Swedish newsroom expose massive taxfraud through the cooperation with ICIJ:s in Panmapapers.
- 2015 "Swissleaks" Swedish Radio Ekot participated as the only Swedish newsroom in the ICIJ project Swissleaks exposing hidden wealth in the Swiss bank HSBC.
- 2014 "Kvinnoregistret" - as editor for Ekots investigative Editor at Swedish Radio Ekot Laurin participated in Bo Göran Bodin och Alexander Gaglianos exposure of an illegal registry kept by the Swedish police over battered women.
- 2013 "The Snowden documents" - on the close relationship between the NSA and Swedish FRA.
- 2012: "The Black Boxes" - on how the Swedish-Finnish state owned telco Teliasonera cooperates with dictatorships like Karimovs Uzbekistan and Lukashenko's Belarus in giving them free access to their mobile telephone systems.
- 2011: "The letter from Mubarak" - on the legacy of the Swedish-Egyptian security collaboration, and first-ever interviews with the rendition-victims Ahmed Agiza and Muhammed Alzery.
- 2011: "Portrait of Torbjörn Törnqvist" - Swedish dollar billionaire and oiltrader. Head of and part owner of giant oil trader Gunvor.
- 2010: "Euro Orphans" - how migrant workers in the wealthier parts of Europe has to abandon their kids.
- 2010: "The Secret of Omega 3" - How fish from Western Sahara is smuggled to the Omega 3 market in Scandinavia
- 2009: "The pink gold" - How farmed salmon is emptying the oceans
- 2008: "Josephs fate" - torture in the Kongo under EU and UN flag.
- 2007: "Gripen - the secret deals"
- 2006: "The Illegal Cod"
- 2005: "The Broken Promise" part 5
- 2004: "The broken promise" part 1,2,3 and 4 Investigative programme. Swedish TV4. A series revealing the political game behind a secret deportation of two terror-suspected Egyptian men, conducted by American agents on Swedish ground.
- 2003: "The network". Investigative programme. Swedish TV4. A series Revealing the largest corruption scandal in the history of Sweden, involving hundreds of people in the Swedish State Monopoly on Alcohol.
- 2003: "They are listening". Investigative programme. Swedish TV4. A program revealing how the Swedish Defence Radio Authority controls internet and telephone communications.
- 2003: "The real operation of DC3". Investigative programme. Swedish TV4. A review of the historic shoot-down by Soviet Russia of a Swedish signals intelligence plane over the Baltic Sea during the Cold War.
- 2002/2003: "The Black Sea". Investigative programme. Swedish TV4. A series revealing the systematic illegal fishing and selling of cod in the Baltic Sea.
- 2002: "The Swede at Guantanamo Bay". Documentary. Swedish TV4. About the Swede Mehdi Muhammed Gehzali who was arrested on the border of Afghanistan and Pakistan in December 2001 and detained on the American military base at Guantanamo Bay, Cuba.
- 2001: "The real life of an AU-pair". Investigative programme. Swedish TV4. A review on the real and often harsh conditions of young women from Eastern Europe, working as AU-pair in the homes of rich Swedish families.

== Selected awards ==
- 2022 Kristallen TV award Current Affairs. "Extremely elaborate, pedagogically told without losing tension and suspense. A revelation with accountability and far-reaching effects - investigative journalism at its best. Here it has also had consequences at the highest international level."
- 2021 Polk Award 2020 for Forbidden Stories "The Cartel Project - Regina Martinez death"
- 2017 Uppdrag granskning was awarded the "Guldspaden" for Panamapapers and ICIJ won an IRE medal and a Pulitzer.
- 2013 Stora journalistpriset for "Årets avslöjande" (with Joachim Dyfvermark and Sven Bergman), Uppdrag granskning, SVT for "Telia Sonera: The Black Boxes and The Uzbek affair"
- 2013 "Kristallen" for the investigative report of the year (with Joachim Dyfvermark and Sven Bergman), for ""Telia Sonera: The Black Boxes and The Uzbek affair"
- 2013 Daniel Pearl Award (with Joachim Dyfvermark and Sven Bergman) for "Telia Sonera: The Black Boxes and The Uzbek affair"
- 2013 Prix Circom (with Joachim Dyfvermark and Sven Bergman) for "Telia Sonera: The Black Boxes and The Uzbek affair"
- 2013 Guldspaden (with Joachim Dyfvermark and Sven Bergman) for "Telia Sonera: The Black Boxes and The Uzbek affair"
- 2012: "Looting the Seas II — Spains subsidized overfishing", was named IRE's Tom Renner-award finalists. and given the 2011 citation for excellence by the Overseas Press Club of America (The Whitman Bassow award) Looting the Seas II was a project by ICIJ, International Consortium of Investigative Journalists.
- 2011: Investigative Reporters and Editors (IRE) Tom Renner award for "Looting the Seas I - the fate of the Bluefin tuna" - a project by ICIJ, International Consortium of Investigative Journalists.
- 2011: Investigative Reporters and Editors (IRE) Tom Renner award for "Bluefin tuna - Looting the Seas" - an ICIJ, International Consortium of Investigative Journalists, project on how blue fin tuna is becoming extinct due to IUU and a collapsed control scheme.
- 2009 Environmental Journalist of the year (with Joachim Dyfvermark and Sven Bergman) for "Rosa Guld" - on the down-sides of the gigant salmonfarming industry.
- 2008 Daniel Pearl Award (with Joachim Dyfvermark and Sven Bergman) for "Den svarta torsken"
- 2008 Edward R Murrow Award (with Sven Bergman och Joachim Dyfvermark) for "Gripen - the secret deals"
- 2007 Stora journalistpriset for "Årets avslöjande" (with med Joachim Dyfvermark and Sven Bergman), Uppdrag granskning, SVT for "Gripen - the secret deals"
- 2005 Stora journalistpriset for "Årets avslöjande" (with med Joachim Dyfvermark and Sven Bergman), Kalla fakta, TV4 for "the broken promise"
- 2005 Publicistklubbens stora pris (with Joachim Dyfvermark and Sven Bergman), Kalla fakta, TV4 för "The broken promise"
- 2004 Overseas Press Clubs Eric and Amy Burger Award (with med Joachim Dyfvermark and Sven Bergman), Kalla fakta, TV4 for "The broken promise"
- 2004 Guldspaden (with Sven Bergman and Joachim Dyfvermark) for "The broken promise" i Kalla fakta, TV4.
- 2004 Edward R Murrow Award (tillsammans med Sven Bergman och Joachim Dyfvermark) for "The broken promise"
- 2003 Hedersomnämnande Guldspaden bribes in state liquor monopoly Systembolaget.
- 2000 Guldspaden (with Leif Holmqvist) bribes in the Swedish Olympic campaign 2004.
