= 2026 Fagersta school attack =

School attack in Fagersta, Sweden

- The suspect posted a picture of the longsword inside of a guitar case, with the text ”No more edits 😔” on TikTok, the image appeared to be taken in the school's upstairs restroom
- Location: 60°00′02″N 15°48′13″E; Brinellskolan, Fagersta, Sweden
- Date: 21 August 2026 c. 2:00 p.m. – 2:16 p.m. (UTC+2)
- Attack type: Mass stabbing; School stabbing; Sword attack
- Weapon: Sword (Note: According to Swedish newspaper Expressen, the weapon may have been an arming sword, possibly a Cold Steel MAA Arming Sword, which had previously been sold in Sweden for €361 (approximately 4,000 Swedish krona) by Flashpoint AB, which operates Tacticalstore.se.)
- Deaths: 1
- Injuries: 3
- Motive: Retaliation for bullying (self-proclaimed); Admiration for previous mass killers and validation in the True Crime Community
- Accused: Liam Nebel
- Charges: Nebel: One count of Murder; Three counts of attempted murder; Unnamed 16-year-old boy: Aiding and abetting murder and attempted murder; Preparing for murder

On 21 August 2026, an 18-year-old student armed with a sword entered Brinellskolan in Fagersta, Sweden, and attacked students inside the school. The suspect, dressed in black, wearing a T-shirt bearing the word "Massacre", a helmet, and a face covering, attacked several students before being arrested by police. One person was killed and three other students were injured, including two who sustained serious injuries. Schools in Fagersta were temporarily placed under lockdown as police responded to the attack.

The suspect was subsequently identified as Liam Nebel and was investigated on suspicion of murder and multiple counts of attempted murder. Nebel's online activity, reportedly included content associated with the True Crime Community (TCC) and videos depicting perpetrators of previous mass killings. Nebel claimed that he was motivated by retaliation for bullying, while his involvement in the TCC also appears to have influenced his motives.

The attack prompted memorials and political reactions in Sweden, as well as scrutiny of Sweden's newly introduced nationwide mobile phone ban in primary schools. On 24 August, the Swedish government announced plans to create a School Violence Commission (Skoldådskommission) in response to the attack. Police also arrested several people in connection to the Fagersta attack.

== Background ==
Brinellskolan is a secondary school in Fagersta. The municipality's academic calendar shows that the 2026–27 autumn term had begun only a few days before the attack, on 17 August for first-year students and 19 August for students in years two and three. The school had previously been evacuated following a shooting threat in May 2026, although no connection between that incident and the August attack had been established.

== Attack ==
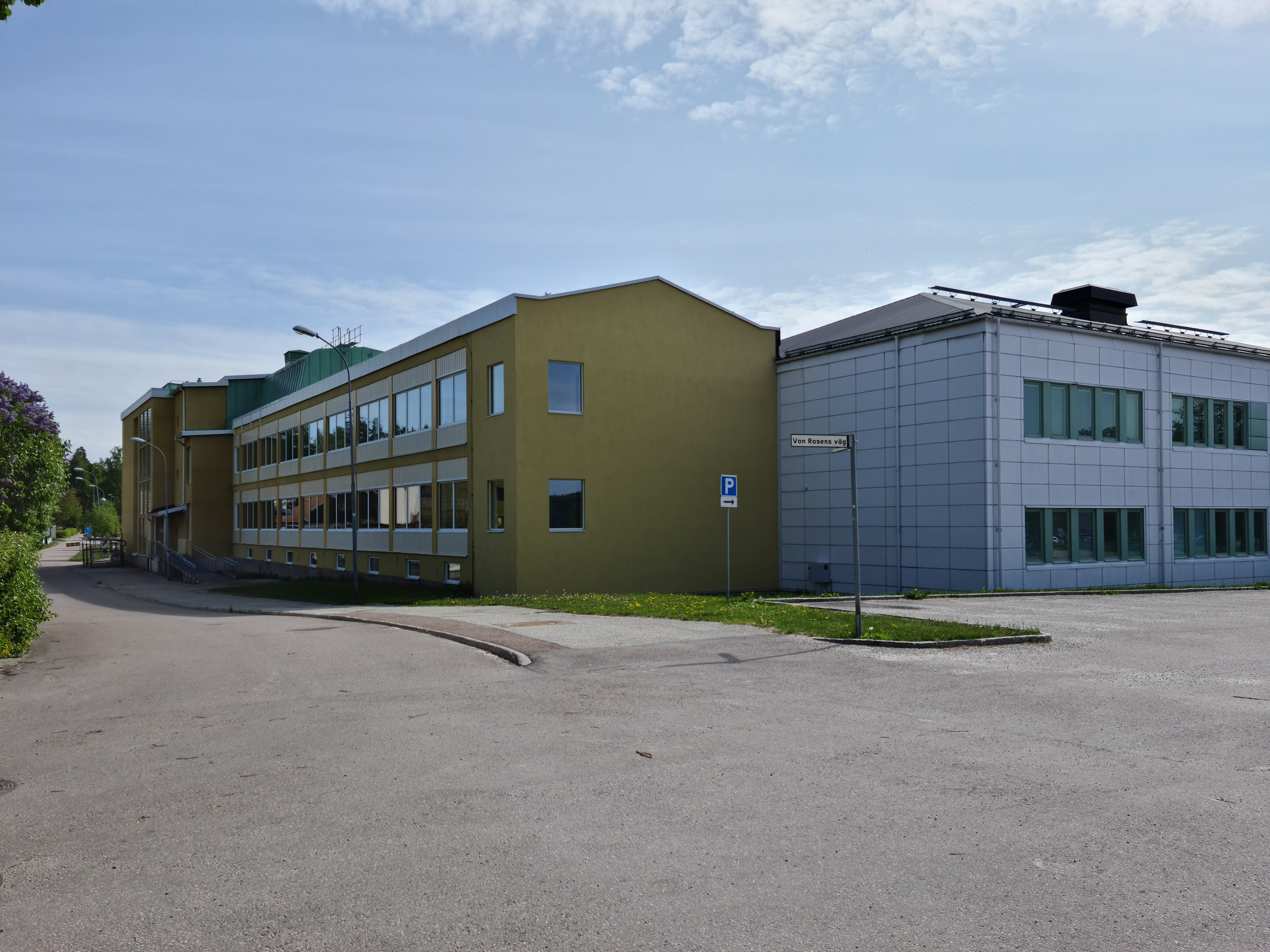
Brinellskolan pictured in 2023

=== Prelude ===
Around 12:00 p.m., two hours before the attack, the suspect reposted a video about bullying on TikTok, the video shows Elliot Rodger, the perpetrator of the Isla Vista attacks in 2014. Later, at 1:41 p.m., the suspect posted a picture of a sword inside of a guitar case, with the text ”No more edits 😔” on TikTok, the image appeared to be taken in the school's upstairs restroom. The account was taken down shortly after the attack at the request of police. The suspect also sent a final message to his foster home, saying, "Thanks for everything", before carrying out the attack. The suspect sent a message to another TikTok user stating that the attack was motivated by revenge against "normies" who had bullied him.

=== Attack ===
An 18-year-old man dressed in black, wearing a T-shirt bearing the word "Massacre", a helmet, and a face covering, entered Brinellskolan using a key tag. According to the Global Network on Extremism & Technology, the suspect's clothing was directly inspired by Anton Lundin Pettersson, who wore a similar outfit during the 2015 Trollhättan school attack, in which he killed three people. Before entering the student hall, the suspect wounded his first victim, a boy in the school's stairwell. At around 2:00 p.m., the suspect was seen entering the student hall on the first floor of the school, where approximately 20 students were gathered. The suspect then pursued Ayad Salah Mohammed, a 16-year-old boy, while saying, "I'm coming after you." The suspect stabbed the boy in the stomach and cut his chest twice before raising the sword in an attempt to stab him in the heart. The boy grabbed the sword, preventing it from striking his heart, but the suspect twisted the weapon, causing severe cuts to nearly all of the boy's fingers. The suspect then stabbed him in the arm. The confrontation caused the students to panic and flee the scene. The suspect also chased another student, who helped an injured victim by driving him to a hospital in an EPA tractor.

At 2:06 p.m. (UTC+2), police received the first report of ongoing violence at Brinellskolan. During the attack, the suspect exchanged messages with several people on social media and allegedly shared an image depicting blood, reportedly representing one of the victims, accompanied by the comment “one is dead”. The attack was also recorded by the suspect. Police patrols were dispatched at 2:09 p.m., while nearby schools and preschools were being evacuated. At 2:16 p.m., two police officers opened fire on the suspect but missed, after which he surrendered and was arrested. When the police task force arrived, the deadly violence had already ended. As police investigated, they found a 17-year-old girl dead and three others injured, two in serious condition.

== Victims ==
A 17-year-old girl was killed in the attack. Three other students were injured, including two boys aged 12 and 16 who sustained serious injuries. A third student sustained minor injuries and was discharged from hospital. According to Proletären, all victims were of foreign descent.

== Immediate aftermath and memorials ==
Several schools and public facilities in Fagersta were temporarily placed under lockdown as a precaution while police searched the area. The restrictions were subsequently lifted. The Fagersta city government set up a crisis center near the school. The Västmanland County government said that police, fire services, and healthcare workers were caring for anyone affected by the stabbing.

Several party leaders cancelled planned speeches ahead of the upcoming 2026 Swedish general election. On the morning after the attack, more than 70 people, including Prime Minister Ulf Kristersson, former Prime Minister Magdalena Andersson, Minister for Justice Gunnar Strömmer, The Liberals leader Simona Mohamsson and Centre Party leader Elisabeth Thand Ringqvist gathered at a memorial site carrying flowers and lighting candles for the victims. Due to the attack, flags were put at half-mast throughout Fagersta.

== Suspect ==
According to the Public Prosecutor's Office, the suspected attacker has been publicly identified as Liam Carlos Nebel (born 23 April 2008), an 18-year-old male who attended the school. The suspect's mother left the family when he was seven, leaving the father as his sole parental guardian. Nebel was mentally and physically abused at his original home; Nebel was investigated ten times from 2011 to 2024 before being placed into foster care in Sundsvall and later moved to a foster home in Fagersta. He was forced to participate in martial arts training against his will and was given reduced amounts of food to control his weight and appearance. According to the administrative court the suspect completed his compulsory education but had not received the medicine and trauma treatment providers had deemed necessary. He also has epilepsy, a neurological disorder that causes seizures.

In 2025, when the suspect was 17 years old, he was convicted of assaulting another student at a school in Fagersta. According to court documents, he kicked the student in the stomach, struck him in the upper body and head, and put him in a chokehold. The altercation was reportedly prompted by the other student making derogatory remarks about his family. Due to him being a minor, he was only sentenced to 25 hours of youth service.

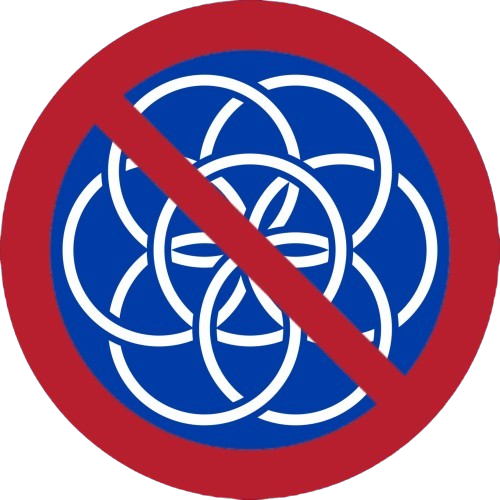
One of the symbols used by members of the True Crime Community was found on the suspect's social media account.

=== Online activity ===
The suspect's social media account, which had more than 3,700 followers, 50,000 likes, and more than 500,000 views before being banned, included content associated with the True Crime Community (TCC), an online subculture that praises mass murderers and school attackers. He also had an account on Viggle AI, where 91 clips featuring perpetrators of violence were uploaded. Videos on his page included AI-generated “rampage dance” videos featuring mass murderers accompanied by music and visual effects, often displaying a “–#” indicating the number of victims killed in an attack. The videos featured various mass murderers, including Elliot Rodger, Marc Lépine, Nikolas Cruz, Anders Behring Breivik, and Anton Lundin Pettersson, who the suspect showed a particular interest in. The suspect's last video, posted five days before the attack, shows an AI-generated video of Anton Lundin Pettersson signing autograph for fans. According to British researcher Joseph Ondrak, the suspect used the Viggle AI application to create such videos. The suspect also reportedly shared content associated with Swedish far-right groups, including the Örebro Party and Alternative for Sweden.

People who had known the suspect reportedly said that he had been introduced to the TCC in 2024 and had expressed admiration for perpetrators of school attacks. Some also reported that he had discussed potential targets before the attack. He was described as a “well-known TCC editor”.

=== Motive ===
According to Nebel, he carried out the attack in retaliation for bullying. His involvement in the TCC also played a role in his motivation, particularly through admiration for Anton Lundin Pettersson, Elliot Rodger, Marc Lépine, Nikolas Cruz, and Anders Behring Breivik.

== Investigation ==
The suspect was initially under investigation for murder and a single count of attempted murder; however, on 21 September 2026, two counts of attempted murder were added, bringing the total to three counts of attempted murder. According to the police, there have been at least 150 interrogations with various people including the suspect as of 28 August 2026. In one of the interrogations, the suspect stated he would have liked to kill more people. The police are planning to interrogate all 450 people who were at the school during the attack. By October, the police had interrogated 760 people.

Police are also investigating if the suspect was involved in communities that promoted school violence. The Swedish Police Authority searched two properties connected to the suspect in the hours following the attack. On 13 September 2026, the Swedish Work Environment Authority joined the investigation. On 15 September 2026, just 25 days after the attack, police announced that the crime scene at the school has been fully documented and the cordon at the school has been lifted.

Investigators were investigating how the suspect obtained the weapon used in the attack and sought to determine its exact model. According to Swedish newspaper Expressen, the weapon may have been an arming sword, possibly a Cold Steel MAA Arming Sword, which had previously been sold in Sweden for €361 (approximately 4,000 Swedish krona) by Flashpoint AB, which operates Tacticalstore.se. Following the incident, the company said it would hold a meeting to consider whether to continue selling sharpened swords.

=== Other arrests ===
On 24 August 2026, a 16-year-old boy who had communicated with the suspect through encrypted messages was arrested by police in Stockholm. He was suspected of aiding and abetting murder and attempted murder. According to media reports, he had encouraged the suspect to carry out the attack and had expressed plans to carry out his own school attack in Stockholm. The 16-year-old boy posted racist, anti-Semitic and misogynistic content on social media. On 31 August 2026, the 16-year-old boy was released from detention but remained suspected of preparing for murder.

On 2 September 2026, another person under the age of 15 was subsequently suspected in connection with the case involving the 16-year-old boy. The individual is suspected of conspiracy to commit murder in relation to an incident allegedly committed between May and August 2026. Prosecutor Kajsa Frisk declined to comment on the case.

On 11 September 2026, police announced that they have identified several young people who had been in contact with Liam Nebel as suspects in separate investigations. A 15-year-old girl was suspected of preparing a murder and was taken into custody after police searched her home, but she was not suspected of involvement in the Fagersta attack. A 13-year-old boy in Gothenburg is also being investigated for grossly illegal threats in relation to the Fagersta attack.

== Legal proceedings ==
The suspect's indictment took place on 21 September 2026. The case involves 21 plaintiffs.

== Reactions ==
=== Domestic ===
Prime Minister Ulf Kristersson described the attack as a "horrific act". King Carl XVI Gustaf said he had received news of the attack "with dismay and sadness". Minister for Justice Gunnar Strömmer said that the Swedish government was monitoring the situation. Several party leaders also cancelled planned speeches ahead of the upcoming 2026 Swedish general election in response to the attack.

=== Government and school policy ===
Following the attack, Sweden's newly introduced nationwide mobile phone ban in primary schools came under scrutiny after students at the nearby Risbroskolan, which was evacuated during the attack, had their phones collected in accordance with the policy. Parents reportedly experienced difficulties contacting their children during the incident. Gunnar Strömmer said he understood the frustration among parents and stated that the experiences from the incident should be taken into consideration when evaluating the mobile phone regulations.

On 24 August 2026, the Swedish government announced plans to create the School Violence Commission (Skoldådskommission) in response to the attack. The commission's stated objectives include preventing violence in schools, addressing online radicalization, and preventing copycat crimes.

=== Online praise ===
Following the attack, images and edits praising the suspect and the attack were circulated online, including videos depicting the perpetrator. In one such video, he is shown dancing while the number “−1” appears on screen, referring to the 17-year-old girl killed in the attack. In response, Magdalena Andersson, leader of the Swedish Social Democratic Party, proposed forming a coalition with other European prime ministers to address the role of large American tech companies in online youth radicalization. The Social Democrats also supports banning social media use for people under the age of 15.

== See also ==
- List of school attacks in Sweden
- 2021 Eslöv school stabbing
- 2019 Kuopio college stabbing, a similar sword attack in Finland
