= Joachim Dyfvermark =

Swedish television journalist

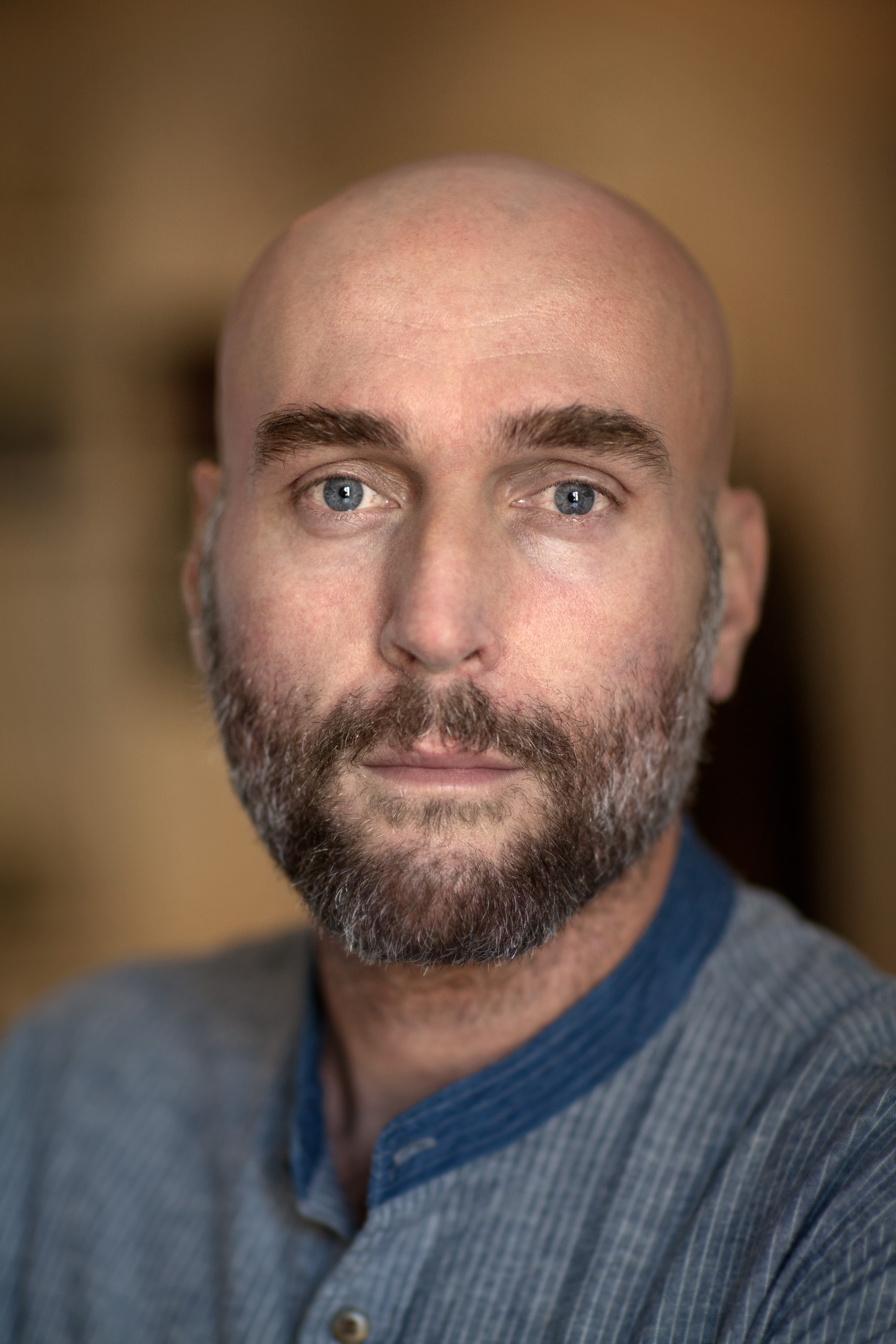
Joachim Dyfvermark in 2013

Joachim Dyfvermark (born September 17, 1968) is a Swedish investigative reporter/producer working for the current affairs program Uppdrag granskning broadcast on Sveriges Television.

== Biography ==
Joachim Dyfvermark has been working as a journalist since 1996. He´s currently working as producer at Sweden’s main investigative program "Uppdrag granskning" at SVT - Swedish Television.

During the period 2000-2013 he formed an investigative team with Sven Bergman and Fredrik Laurin. From 2000-2006 the team worked for Swedish TV4:s investigative program "Kalla fakta", and from September 2006 on "Uppdrag granskning" at SVT - Swedish Television. From 2018 Dyfvermark works in team with Axel Gordh Humlesjö and Linda Kakuli Larsson, still at "Uppdrag granskning"/SVT.

Joachim Dyfvermark has also been working as a news reporter on Swedish TV4 (1996-1997) and as a show host for TV4's investigative programme "Kalla fakta" (2000).

He lectures occasionally on investigative journalism and story telling at international journalist conferences and several universities in Sweden.

Joachim Dyfvermark is a member of the International Consortium of Investigative Journalists, ICIJ.

== Reporting ==
In 2005 the team were rewarded with a number of awards, among them awards from the Overseas Press Club of America, RTNDA:s Edward R Murrow award and the Stora journalistpriset (Swedish equivalent to the Pulitzer Prize) as well as the Swedish Investigative Reporters and Editors award "Guldspaden" for their reporting on the secret deportation of two Egyptians in what was one of the first operations known as "Extraordinary rendition".

The two men, Ahmed Agiza and Muhammed Al Zery, were taken from Bromma airport in Sweden in December 2001 to Egypt in a covert operation by US agents and handed over to Egyptian security services and were subsequently tortured. The story caused a major uproar in Sweden, drew international attention and was one of the first to shed light on "Extraordinary Rendition". The report could uncover that the aircraft used in the rendition was a US registered Gulfstream V with the registration number N379P. Together with the UK-reporter Stephen Grey the team disclosed that N379P was a part of a much larger fleet of CIA planes used for rendition operations.

Joachim Dyfvermark, and his co-producers Bergman & Laurin, also received several awards, among them a second "Stora Journalistpriset", for their 2007 report on the bribery in the sale of the Swedish jet-fighter Gripen to the Czech Republic, Hungary and South Africa.

In September 2008, they received the ICIJ Daniel Perl award for their 2006 report in National TV4: "The Illegal Cod", a story about the illegal fishing in the Barents Sea. And in November 2009 they were appointed Environmental journalist of the year for "Pink Gold" on the unsustainable farming of salmon.

In 2012 the trio started publishing a number of stories on the state-owned Swedish telecom giant Telia Sonera. The first documentary, aired in April 2012, could expose how the company cooperated with oppressive regimes in the business region "Eurasia", that included longtime dictatorships like Uzbekistan and Azerbaijan. Telia Sonera helped the regimes to monitor journalists, political opposition and democratic activists. In September 2012 the first reportage on how the company also bribed their way to these markets was published, which after several subsequent reports led to the resignation of many top official, among them the company’s CEO Lars Nyberg (2013) and the board. In 2015 Telia Sonera declared that they were selling all its assets in "Eurasia". The recipient of Telia Soneras payments for Uzbek licenses, Gulnara Karimova - the daughter to the longtime dictator Islam Karimov - was deposed by her father because of the international scandal following the publication. In 2013 the trio was awarded another "Guldspaden" by Swedish Investigative Editors and Reporters and with a third Stora journalistpriset for their reporting on Telia Sonera.

In 2016, Joachim Dyfvermark and Sven Bergman worked on the Panama Papers, covering Sweden and Island. The reporting led to the resignation of the Icelandic Prime minister Sigmundur Davíð Gunnlaugsson, but also multiple investigations regarding the Nordic bank Nordea. Dyfvermark & Bergman were awarded with Prix Europa in 2016 for their story, and nominated to Emmy Awards in 2017.

In 2019, Joachim Dyfvermark published an investigation together with Axel Gord Humlesjö, Linda Lanrsson Kakuli and Per Agerman, revealing massive suspected money laundering in Swedbanks business in the Baltic states. The four-part series led to a number of police investigations in several countries, and a large part of the top officials in Swedbank were dismissed. The team was awarded Stora journalistpriset for their reporting on Swedbank, and was nominated to Emmy Awards in 2020.

== Filmography ==
- 2022 ”Securitas Secrets”. Investigative story on suspect corruption within the global security giant Securitas.
- 2022 “Dirty Steel” Cooperation with Forbidden Stories. Environmental, corruption & money laundering. Investigation into nickel mining by Solway Group in Guatemala.
- 2022 “Suisse Secrets” Cooperation with led by OCCRP, Organized Crime and Corruption Reporting Project. International corruption & money laundering. A leak from Credit Suisse, exposing details of over 30,000 clients.
- 2021 “Pandora Papers” Cooperation with ICIJ, International Consortium of Investigative Journalists. A leak from 14 offshore service providers that help clients establish companies in secrecy jurisdictions.
- 2021 “Handelsbanken & the brotherhood”, investigation about the leadership behind Handelsbanken and Industrivärden, corruption and money laundering.
- 2021 “Dirty clothes”, investigation about organized crime and systematic theft from charity.
- 2020 “FinCen Files” Cooperation with ICIJ, International Consortium of Investigative Journalists. A leak from FinCen, The Financial Crimes Enforcement Network (US). The Swedish story had a special focus on money laundering in SEB (Swedish bank).
- 2020 “Telia & the secret” Follow up investigation showing major shortcomings in the prosecutor's investigation.
- 2019 “SEB & money laundering”. Investigation revealing that yet another Swedish bank is involved in the Baltic money laundering scandal: SEB.
- 2019 “Dirty banking – Swedbank & money laundering”. Investigation revealing massive money laundering in the Baltic states. The three-part series led to a number of police investigations in several countries, and a large parts of the top officials in Swedbank were dismissed.
- 2017:”Paradise Papers – Secrets of the Global Elite” – giant leak about the offshore finance industry, cooperation with ICIJ, International Consortium of Investigative Journalists. Special focus on Sweden.
- 2017:“The Derailed Deal” - Investigation revealing Bombardier Transportation´s dirty affairs in Stockholm and Azerbaijan.
- 2017: “Abuse and the UN” – Exposing sexual abuse of children within the UN, and the lack of leadership to handle the problem.
- 2016: “The Panama Papers” - Exposing the rogue offshore finance industry, cooperation with ICIJ, International Consortium of Investigative Journalists. Special focus on Sweden and Island.
- 2016: “The treasure hunt – the Swedish tax evasion” – Investigation revealing a unique database of almost 9000 Swedes who have had hidden assets in tax havens.
- 2015: “The biggest bribe in Sweden” – Investigation revealing how Telia Sonera added some 6 billion Swedish crowns into the private pocket of the Aliyev family in Azerbaijan.
- 2015: "Crisis in The Milky Way" - Investigative documentary about the Swedish multinational company Arla, and the crisis in the Swedish dairy industry (SVT).
- 2014: “The China affair” – Investigating documentary about the secret deal between FOI - Swedish Defence Research Agency – and the Chinese military industry CAE (SVT).
- 2014: “LuxLeaks” – Investigative documentary in cooperation with ICIJ (International Consortium of Investigative Journalists) about multinational companies and their aggressive tax schemes in Luxembourg (SVT).
- 2013: “The Snowden files – Sweden”- Investigating documentary about NSA and the Swedish FRA, based on the exclusive access to the Snowden files (SVT).
- 2012/2013: “The Uzbek affair” - Nordic Telecom giant Telia Sonera´s bribery scandal with the Karimov-regime in Uzbekistan (Several documentaries on the topic, SVT).
- 2012: “The black boxes” – Nordic Telecom giant Telia Sonera´s intimately connection to human rights abuses in the former CIS countries (SVT).
- 2010: “Euro-orphans” - Migrant workers from Eastern Europe has to abandon their children when working in wealthier parts of Europe (SVT).
- 2010: “In secret” – Secret military intelligence reports about suspected Russian dumping of radioactive material and chemical agents in the Baltic Sea (SVT).
- 2009: “De suspects” – Swedish citizen suspected of terrorist crimes in Pakistan (SVT).
- 2009: “The last battle” – Investigating the investigations regarding systematic bribes in the JAS 39 Gripen campaign (SVT).
- 2008: “The Facade” – The Scientology front organizations (SVT).
- 2008: “Torture in Congo” – Investigative reportage about torture on a UN camp in Congo 2003 during “Operation Artemis” (SVT).
- 2008: “Gripen – the secret deals” (part 5) (SVT).
- 2007: “Gripen – the secret deals” (Part 1-4) – Systematic bribes in the JAS 39 Gripen campaign (SVT).
- 2006: “The Illegal Cod” – Illegal fishing in the Barents Sea (TV4).
- 2005: “The Broken Promise” part 5 (TV4).
- 2004: “The broken promise”. Part 1,2,3 and 4. Investigative program. A series revealing the political game behind a secret deportation of two Egyptian men suspected of terrorism, conducted by American agents on Swedish ground (TV4).
- 2003: “The network”. Investigative program. A series revealing the largest corruption scandal in the history of Sweden, involving hundreds of people in the Swedish State Monopoly on Alcohol (TV4).
- 2002/2003: “Happiness for sale”. Investigative program. A series revealing the methods and mind control used by international company Landmark Education (TV4).
- 2002/2003: “The Black Sea”. Investigative program. Swedish TV4. A series revealing the systematic illegal fishing and selling of cod in the Baltic Sea (TV4).
- 2002: "The Swede at Guantanamo Bay". Documentary. About the Swede Mehdi Muhammed Gehzali who was arrested on the border of Afghanistan and Pakistan in December 2001 and detained on the American military base at Guantanamo Bay, Cuba (TV4).
- 2002: “Get rid of everything”. Investigative program. A review on how the Swedish military throw away a lot of their material, even the new stuff (TV4).
- 2002: “The companies’ doctors”. Investigative program. A series revealing the hidden agenda and money between the insurance companies and the doctors who decide if injured insurance takers shall be given compensation.
- 2001: “The hidden price of contraceptive pills”. Investigative program. A series revealing the side-effects of third-generation contraceptive pills, and that the international medical companies have covered up their own research showing these serious side-effects (TV4).
- 2001: “Code 42”. Investigative program. A series revealing widespread illegal abuse of animals in Swedish slaughterhouses (TV4).
- 2000: “12 crowns per hour”. Investigative program. How immigrants are ruthlessly used by Swedish companies (TV4).
- 2000: “The only truth”. Investigative program. A review on the side-effects of child vaccines, and how big international vaccine companies in secret pay off families whose children have been damaged by side-effects (TV4).
- 2000: “Expedition Estonia”. Investigative program. A review on the illegal diving expedition to the wreck of Estonia, and the conspiracy -theories of why the ship sunk in 1994 (TV).
- 1999: “The smuggling of alcohol”. Documentary. Two hour-long documentaries about organized smuggling of liquor to Sweden, corruption in the Custom Authority and the consequences among the teenagers drinking the illegal alcohol(TV4).
- 1998: “The land of little resistance”. Investigative program. A series revealing the secret operations by the international Scientology fighting all critics trying to make the most secret text of Scientology an official document (TV4).

== Selected awards ==
- 2021 DIG AWARDS, SPECIAL MENTION for best long investigative TV documentary, by the Italian Associazione DIG (Dyfvermark, Gordh-Humlesjö, Larsson-Kakuli). For the documentary "DIRTY CLOTHES".
- 2020 DIG Awards, for best long investigative TV documentary, by the Italian Associazione DIG (Dyfvermark, Gordh-Humlesjö, Larsson-Kakuli, Agerman). For the documentary “Dirty Banking”.
- 2020 Emmy nominee by The International Emmy® Current Affairs & News (Dyfvermark, Gordh-Humlesjö, Larsson-Kakuli, Agerman). For the documentary “Dirty Banking”.
- 2020 “Guldspaden” by Swedish Investigative Reporters and Editors. (Dyfvermark, Gordh-Humlesjö, Larsson-Kakuli, Agerman) for the documentary – “Swedbank & money laundering”.
- 2019 ”Stora journalistpriset” (The Swedish equivalent to the Pulitzer prize) for the documentary – “Swedbank & money laundering” (Dyfvermark, Gordh-Humlesjö, Larsson-Kakuli, Agerman).
- 2019 Winner of “Kristallen” (The Swedish equivalent to the Emmy awards) for best investigative reportage “Swedbank & money laundering” (Dyfvermark, Gordh-Humlesjö, Larsson-Kakuli, Agerman).
- 2018, British Journalism Award - Global Investigation of the Year (Dyfvermark, Karin Mattisson & Sven Bergman) for “Abuse and the UN”.
- 2018 (citation) Prix Europa, by The European Broadcasting Festival (Dyfvermark, Karin Mattisson & Sven Bergman) for “Abuse and the UN”.
- 2017 Emmy nominee by The International Emmy® Current Affairs & News (Dyfvermark & Bergman) for “The Panama Papers – Sweden”.
- 2017 “Guldspaden” by Swedish Investigative Reporters and Editors. (Dyfvermark & Bergman) for “The Panama Papers – Sweden”.
- 2017 “Pulitzer prize” by Pulitzer Center. Together with 400 other journalists within ICIJ for “Panama Papers”
- 2016 Prix Europa, by The European Broadcasting Festival. (Dyfvermark & Bergman) for “The Panama Papers – Sweden”.
- 2016 Tom Renner Award by Investigative Reporters and Editors (OCCRP, Dyfvermark, Westerberg, Bergman) for The Khadija Project, which continues the work of the former imprisoned Azerbaijani journalist Khadija Ismayilova.
- 2015 Honorable mention at “Guldspaden” by Swedish Investigative Reporters and Editors (Dyfvermark, Miranda Patrucic, Ola Westerberg, Sven Bergman & Khadija Ismayilova) for the investigation “The largest bribe in Sweden – Telia Sonera in Azerbaijan”
- 2013 Stora journalistpriset (The Swedish equivalent to the Pulitzer Prize) (Dyfvermark, Bergman & Laurin) for the documentary – The Uzbek affair - about Telia Sonera´s bribery affair in Uzbekistan.
- 2013 Daniel Pearl Award by The Center for Public Integrity, USA, (Dyfvermark, Bergman & Laurin) for The Uzbek affair - about Telia Sonera´s bribery affair in Uzbekistan.
- 2013 – Winner of “Kristallen” (The Swedish equivalent to the Emmy awards) for best investigative reportage – The Uzbek affair - about Telia Sonera´s bribery affair in Uzbekistan (Dyfvermark, Bergman & Laurin).
- 2013 – Winner of Prix Circom Investigative Journalism Award” for "Telia Sonera - The Uzbek Affair" (Dyfvermark, Bergman & Laurin).
- 2013 - Guldspaden by Swedish Investigative Reporters and Editors (Dyfvermark, Bergman & Laurin) for the investigation of Telia Sonera.
- 2009 “Environmental journalist of the year” by The Swedish Association for Environmental Journalists (Dyfvermark, Bergman & Laurin) together with Ola Christoffersson for "Pink Gold" on the unsustainable farming of salmon.
- 2008 Daniel Pearl Award by The Center for Public Integrity, USA, (Dyfvermark, Bergman & Laurin) for "The Illegal Cod" on the illegal fishing in the Barents Sea.
- 2008 Edward R Murrow Award by Radio-Television News Directors Association of America (Dyfvermark, Bergman & Laurin) for the report “Gripen – the secret deals”.
- 2007 Stora journalistpriset (The Swedish equivalent to the Pulitzer Prize) (Dyfvermark, Bergman & Laurin) for the report “Gripen – the secret deals” on how Sweden´s military industry bribed the way for the export of the Swedish jetfighter Gripen to the Czech Republic.
- 2007 “Nordiska dokumentärfilmspriset” (Dyfvermark, Bergman & Laurin) for the report “Gripen – the secret deals” on how Sweden´s military industry bribed the way for the export of the Swedish jetfighter Gripen to the Czech Republic.
- 2006 “Breiflabb-price” (Dyfvermark & Laurin) for the reports “The Illegal Cod”. This Norwegian price is given to journalists who in their professional work have contributed to a positive development of the fishing industry.
- 2005 Stora journalistpriset (The Swedish equivalent to the Pulitzer Prize) (Dyfvermark, Bergman & Laurin) for a series of reports about the secret deportation of two Egyptians in the "Extraordinary rendition program".
- 2005 “Special citation award” by ICIJ, The Center for Public Integrity (Dyfvermark, Bergman & Laurin) for "The Broken Promise”.
- 2005 Publicistklubbens stora pris by Publicistklubben of Sweden (Dyfvermark, Bergman & Laurin) for "The Broken Promise”.
- 2004 Overseas Press Clubs Eric and Amy Burger Award by Overseas Press Club of America (Dyfvermark, Bergman & Laurin) for "The Broken Promise”.
- 2004 Edward R Murrow Award by Radio-Television News Directors Association of America (Dyfvermark, Bergman & Laurin) for "The Broken Promise”.
- 2004 Guldspaden by Swedish Investigative Reporters and Editors (Dyfvermark, Bergman & Laurin) for "The Broken Promise”.
- 2004 “Det lite större journalistpriset” (Dyfvermark, Bergman & Laurin)by Mid Sweden University.
- 2004 “Vilhelm Moberg-stipendiet” by Arbetaren (Dyfvermark, Bergman & Laurin) for "The Broken Promise”.
- 2003 Citation Guldspaden (Dyfvermark, Bergman & Laurin) together with Fredrik Lundberg for a story uncovering a huge corruption scandal in "Systembolaget" (the Swedish State Monopoly on Alcohol).
