= 2015 Trollhättan school attack =

School attack in Trollhättan, Sweden

Trollhättan school attack
- CCTV still of the perpetrator
- Native name: Skolattacken i Trollhättan
- Location: 58.2691°N 12.3055°E; Kronan School, Trollhättan, Sweden
- Date: 22 October 2015; 10:06 a.m. – 10:16 a.m. (UTC+2)
- Target: Immigrant students and teachers
- Attack type: Mass stabbing, School stabbing
- Weapons: Cold Steel Viking sword; Tantō knife (unused)
- Deaths: 4 (including the perpetrator)
- Injuries: 2
- Perpetrator: Anton Niclas Lundin Pettersson
- Motive: Xenophobia, suicidal ideation

On 22 October 2015, a mass stabbing occurred at Kronan Primary School (Kronans grundskola) (Note: Despite literally translating to "primary school" or "elementary school", in Sweden, a grundskola offers schooling from grades one through nine, similar to a K-8 school.) in Trollhättan, Sweden. 21-year-old Anton Lundin Pettersson killed three people and wounded another two with a sword, later dying from gunshot wounds sustained after charging police.

The initial police investigation concluded that Pettersson was motivated by opposition to immigration and had chosen the school as his target due to its location in a neighbourhood with a high immigrant population.

== Background ==
The city of Trollhättan has a history of previous hate crimes, including an arson attack at a mosque in the 1990s. It has been described as the most ethnically segregated city in Sweden.

== Stabbing ==
Pettersson prepared for the attack on the morning of 22 October 2015. At around 9 a.m., he put on a homemade outfit consisting of a black-painted Stahlhelm-style helmet from the Second World War, a long black cape, a black paintball mask, and black boots. He also painted his face white, applied black eyeliner around his eyes and put glitter in his hair. Media outlets compared Pettersson's appearance to the appearance of Darth Vader, a fictional character in the film franchise Star Wars. Before leaving his apartment in Trollhättan, he left a handwritten farewell letter on a table in the hallway, blaming immigration and society for his planned actions.

Pettersson subsequently drove to his older brother's home, intending to leave his wallet and remaining money on the kitchen table. His brother had already left for work. Pettersson then drove to Kronan.

Pettersson entered Kronan at 10:06, two people were present: 20-year-old teaching assistant Lavin Eskandar and his support student David Issa, who were sitting next to each other at a table. 20-year-old teaching assistant Lavin Eskandar, an ethnic Feyli Kurd, met Pettersson, who immediately stabbed him. Eskandar died at the scene. When 14-year-old student David Issa yelled "What the hell are you doing?", Pettersson struck him with the ricasso of the sword, lightly injuring him.

Pettersson then searched the school for approximately ten minutes. According to the police's account, he spared younger children and girls. He subsequently attacked 15-year-old student Ahmed Hassan, who was in the staircase between the ground floor and the upper walkway. Hassan died from his injuries later that day in hospital.

Whilst wandering the halls, two students encountered Pettersson and, believing his presence to be a Halloween prank, posed with him and took a picture. Niclas Hallgren, the city's police chief, said that Pettersson spared them due to them having white skin.

Shortly after, a 42-year-old teacher, Nazir Amso, confronted Pettersson and demanded he remove his mask. Petterson then charged at Amso and stabbed him. Amso died of his injuries six weeks later in hospital on 3 December. The next victim was a student named Wahed Kosa, who was sitting in a classroom when the perpetrator knocked. When Kosa opened the door, he was attacked. Despite being severely injured, Kosa managed to fend off the perpetrator, then close and lock the door.

The first emergency call to the police was received at 10:08 a.m., reporting that a masked individual armed with a knife and sword had entered the school and attacked staff and students. The first police patrol arrived at 10:16 a.m. The two officers reportedly shouted "Police! Drop the sword!" when they encountered Pettersson. When he advanced towards them with his sword raised, both officers fired simultaneously, with one of the bullets striking him in the abdomen.

Two school employees and three students, all male, were attacked. Eskandar, who was born in 1995, died at the scene; Hassan, born in 2000, died in hospital later that day; and Amso died in hospital six weeks later from his injuries. Pettersson also died following the police shooting.

During the attack, Pettersson played the song "Dragula (Hot Rod Herman Remix)" by Rob Zombie on loop. Apart from his sword, he carried with him a tantō knife as a backup weapon, which was unused in the attack.

Following the attack, a preliminary investigation was launched, which concluded that Pettersson had acted alone. A separate preliminary investigation was routinely opened into the two police officers who had shot him, but it was discontinued after a few weeks.

== Perpetrator ==
Anton Niclas Lundin Pettersson (Note: The family name is Lundin Pettersson, not Pettersson.) (22 June 1994 – 22 October 2015) was identified as the attacker by Expressen. Pettersson had no criminal record and was not a member of any political organisation, but had supported a petition by the Sweden Democrats to initiate a referendum on immigration. According to Aftonbladet, Pettersson had visited far-right and extremist websites supporting Adolf Hitler and Nazi Germany and had also joined a Facebook group that opposed immigration to Sweden. The Swedish Security Service was called in to investigate these findings.

Pettersson lived in an apartment building far away from Kronan but chose to attack the school due to it being in Kronogården, a town with a high immigrant population; police cited this as more evidence towards his motive. Former classmates described Pettersson as a lonely person who "lived in his own world" and dressed in black clothing influenced by the emo or rock scene. There is strong evidence to suggest he had autism spectrum disorder, although his parents did not want him diagnosed. He often avoided eye contact, had difficulty understanding other people, and was characterized as being physically rigid and stubborn. One pediatrician who studied the case posthumously diagnosed him as such.

Bjørn Ihler, a survivor of the 2011 Norway attacks, wrote in The Guardian that in 2013, Pettersson had liked a YouTube video of former Ku Klux Klan leader Johnny Lee Clary testifying how a positive experience with a black man had caused him to disavow his previously-held racist beliefs. He was also said to have interacted with online content that demeaned women and religious people.

Self-harm scars were found on his arms, and it was later revealed that he had completed an online test for depression, along with watching videos of people committing suicide. He had saved material surrounding hopelessness, being misunderstood, self-hatred, violence, and death, along with material suggesting he was uncertain about his sexual identity. Pettersson allegedly took inspiration from the Columbine High School massacre, notably in wearing a trench coat.

A day before his attack, he watched a video collage of military footage starring Nazis during World War II, along with the song When Evil Speaks by Belgian electro-industrial group Suicide Commando. Less than an hour before the killings, he sent a message to one of his online friends, a 25-year-old Dutch man, stating that he would "be dead in the next hour or two" and called him the best friend he ever had. He also declared that he hated himself and stated that he wanted responding officers to shoot him dead in an attempt of suicide by cop.

== Aftermath and reactions ==
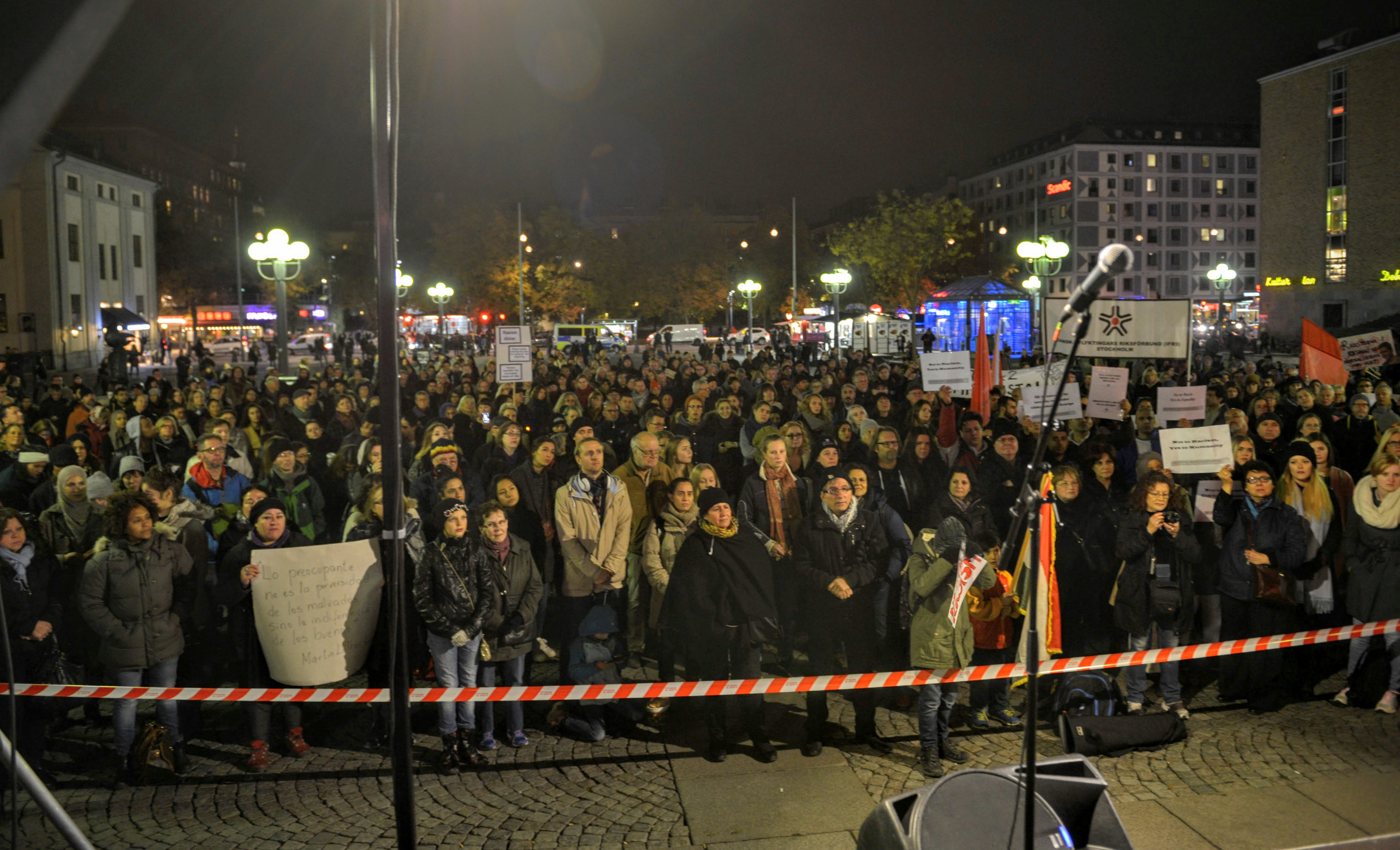
Gathering at Medborgarplatsen to honor the victims of the attack a week after.

On the morning of 23 October, a day after the attack, Swedish police and media confirmed that the attack had "racist motives" and that it was a "hate crime". Niclas Hallgren, the city's police chief, stated that all of the victims of the attack were "dark-skinned". Head of Investigation, Thord Haraldsson said that CCTV footage showed that Pettersson spared the lives of students with white skin. The initial police investigation concluded that Pettersson was motivated by opposition to immigration and had chosen the school as his target due to its location in a neighbourhood with a high immigrant population.

After the news of the attack, Prime Minister Stefan Löfven travelled to Trollhättan, calling it a "black day" for the country. Minister for Integration Anders Ygeman wrote on Twitter: "It is with sadness and dismay I received the news of the attack on the school in Trollhättan. My thoughts go to the victims and their families". King Carl XVI Gustaf said that the royal family received the news "with great dismay and sadness".

During the days leading up to Halloween, there were reports of people wearing suspicious outfits or brandishing weapons, which were discovered to be people celebrating Halloween. The police warned the public not to carry imitation weapons with their Halloween costumes, to avoid potentially dangerous misunderstandings. Kronan school remained closed until 2 November, when it reopened with higher security.

On 29 September 2017, a book about the attack was published, Det som aldrig fick ske (transl. What Was Never Supposed To Happen). The book contained information about the attack previously unavailable to the public, including a message Pettersson sent to an online friend before the attack that the Pettersson family did not know about. The author, Åsa Erlandsson, spoke to the brother of Pettersson. Erlandsson won the Stora Journalistpriset for the book.

=== Copycat attacks ===
On 15 March 2019, two consecutive mass shootings occurred in a terrorist attack on two mosques in Christchurch, New Zealand, where 51 people were killed and 40 others were injured. The perpetrator behind the shootings mentioned Pettersson in his manifesto and declared his support for him, in addition to writing Pettersson's name on one of his guns.

On 10 June 2025, a 16-year-old student armed with a sword and knife attempted to commit a mass stabbing at Neelin High School, in Brandon, Manitoba, Canada, injuring a 15-year-old Nigerian immigrant student in the process. After the school went into lockdown and students barricaded themselves in classroom, the suspect, who asked for police to fatally shoot him, was tased and subdued. On his phone were thousands of images and videos relating to Nazism, weapons, and school attacks, and he admitted to investigators he was "inspired" by the Trollhättan attack. During the stabbing, he wore a black trench coat and mask, similar to Pettersson's.

On 21 August 2026, an 18-year-old man armed with a sword entered Brinellskolan, a school in Fagersta, Västmanland County, Sweden. The attack left one person dead and three others injured. According to Aftonbladet, the suspect wore black clothing, a helmet, and a face covering. Some reports compared his clothing to that worn by Pettersson.

== See also ==
- List of school attacks in Sweden
- 2015 Västerås IKEA attack
- 2019 Kuopio college stabbing
- 2026 Fagersta school attack
