= Emma Frans =

Swedish epidemiologist

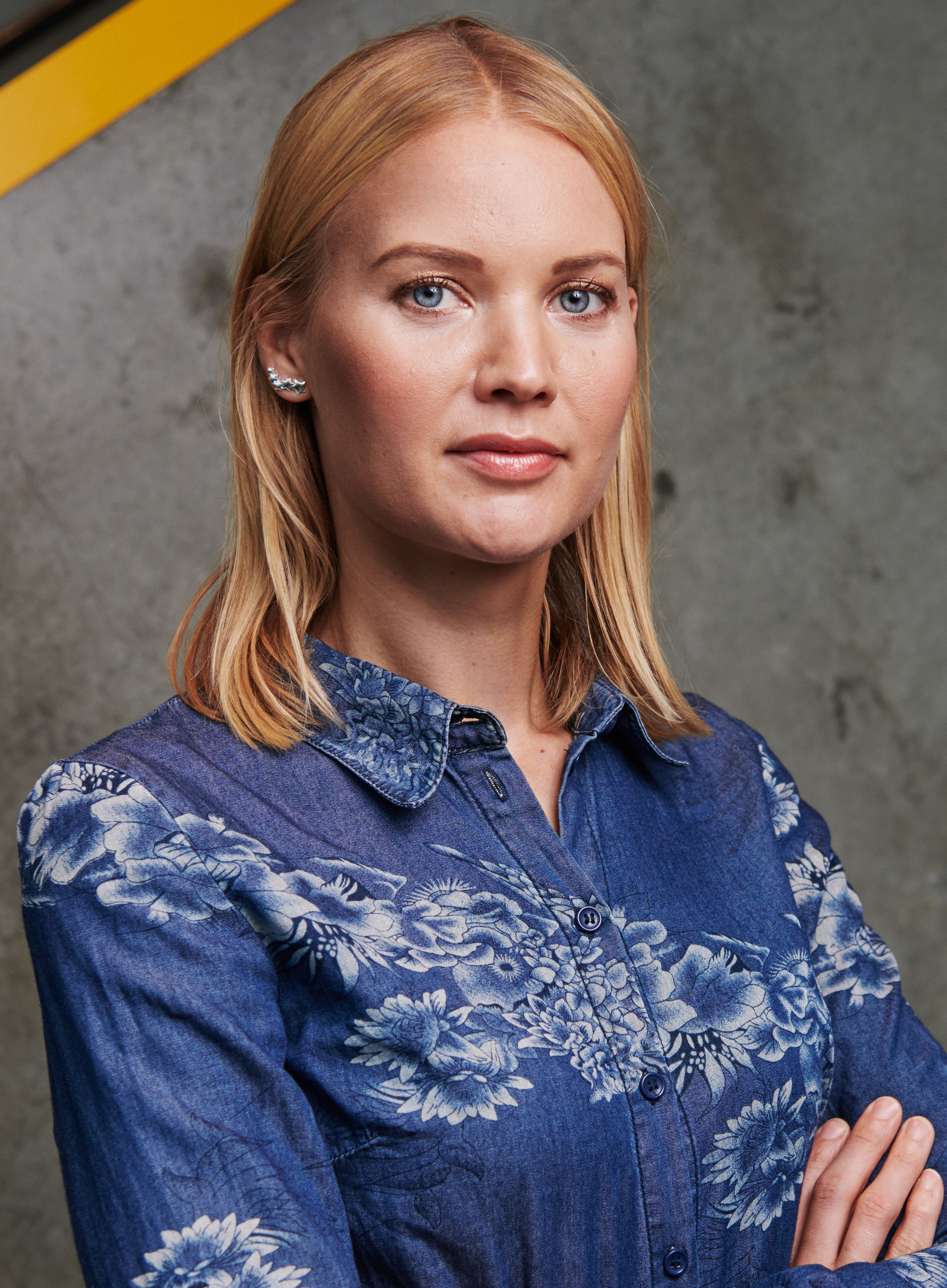
Emma Frans

Emma Maria Frans (born 16 December 1981, in Uppsala, Sweden) is a postdoctoral researcher in medical epidemiology at Karolinska Institutet in Stockholm and well-known science communicator in Sweden. She is also known for writing the column "Vetenskapskollen" ("Science Watch") in the newspaper Svenska Dagbladet, where she examines the correctness and scientific accuracy of sensational news and popular science articles.

== Career ==
Frans developed an interest in the functioning of the human body and mind from an early age. Her parents were psychologists, which she says was a possible influence on her interest in the concrete and quantifiable. She studied biomedicine at Uppsala University and completed her PhD studies at Karolinska Institutet, studying the incidence of autism among children with relatively old fathers.

In 2013, Frans started a blog, and later became active on Twitter, in the aim of counteracting public misconceptions in science.

In 2017, Frans published the book Larmrapporten ("The Alarm Report"), which aims to teach the public how to distinguish between good and faulty scientific claims. The same year she was awarded Stora Journalistpriset, the "Swedish Grand Prize for Journalism", in the category "Årets röst" (voice of the year). The reason given by the jury was "for fighting against resistance to facts and with scientific exactness debunking the Internet's tenacious myths, in an entertaining way". Also in 2017, she was elected "Årets folkbildare" (Enlightener of the Year) by Föreningen Vetenskap och Folkbildning for "her ability to, in a pedagogical and humorous way, spread knowledge and debunk myths and misunderstandings about science."

In 2018, Frans was named as one of three new "Democracy Ambassadors" (demokratiambassadörer) by the Swedish government, working on the committee "Democracy 100 years" (Demokratin 100 år) to advance and promote the democracy in advance of its 100 year anniversary through dialogue and by building partnerships with and between different parts of society.

Frans's second book Sant, falskt, eller mittemellan? ("True, false, or in between?") was published in December 2018 and seeks to give scientific answers and explanations to common questions and myths.

In 2019, Frans was once again named "Årets folkbildare". On July 13, 2019 she hosted the radio show Sommar i P1.

In 2021 she published her third book, Alla tvättar händerna ("Everybody washes their hands"). The book is self-described as a diary "from the year where everyone blamed each-other", in a reference to the Coronavirus.

In 2022 Frans published the young adult literature title Tänk som en forskare ("Think like a scientist"), and in 2023 her fifth book Expertparadoxen ("The Expert Paradox"), about potential pitfalls of blindly believing scientific authorities, was published.

== Publications ==
- Larmrapporten, Volante, 2017
- Sant, falskt, eller mittemellan?, Volante, 2018
- Alla tvättar händerna, Volante, 2021
- Tänk som en forskare, Bonnier Carlsen, 2022
- Expertparadoxen, Bonnier Fakta, 2023
