= 2015 Västerås IKEA attack =

Knife attack in Västmanland, Sweden

- Ukbagabir grabbing the knife used in the attack

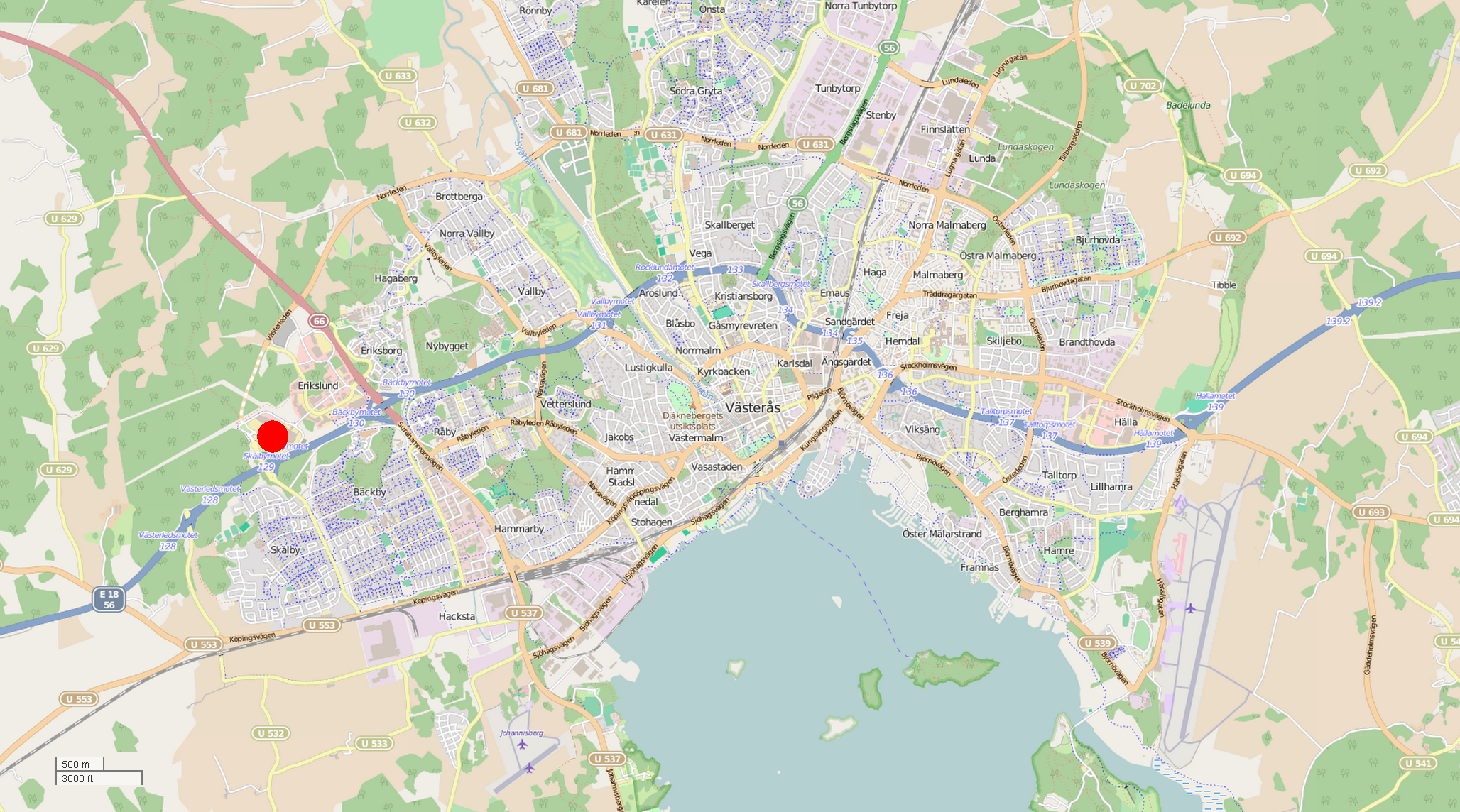
- Location within Västerås
- Location: 59°36′32.9″N 16°27′16.9″E; Västerås, Sweden
- Date: 10 August 2015
- Target: Swedish-looking people
- Attack type: Stabbing
- Weapon: IKEA Knife
- Deaths: 2
- Injuries: 1 (the perpetrator)
- Perpetrator: Abraham Ukbagabir
- Motive: Revenge for rejected asylum application

On 10 August 2015, mother-son pair Carola Herlin and Emil Herlin were murdered at an IKEA store at the Erikslund Shopping Center in Västerås, Sweden. The perpetrator, Abraham Ukbagabir, was found with self-inflicted injuries in a nearby store section. Ukbagabir was convicted of two first degree murder charges and sentenced to life in prison in December 2015.

As Ukbagabir was an Eritrean immigrant and later stated he had acted out of vengeance due to his denied asylum request, the stabbing received attention amidst the 2015 European migrant crisis.

== Attack ==
A few hours before the attack, the perpetrator, Abraham Ukbagabir, a 36-year-old Eritrean Christian, travelled from his refugee accommodations in Arboga to Västerås, accompanied by a 23-year-old fellow Eritrean resident. In Västerås, Ukbagabir first attended an appointment with the Swedish Migration Agency regarding a deportation order he received on 27 July, which he was informed was still in place. Afterwards, Ukbagabir told his friend that he wanted to go shopping at a local IKEA.

Inside the IKEA, Ukbagabir took a knife from the kitchenware department and began looking for Swedish-looking people to attack. He attacked Carola Herlin (55) and her son Emil Herlin (28), who were visiting from Skellefteå. The attack was not caught on any surveillance cameras, but according to eyewitness accounts made to the Aftonbladet newspaper, the attacker stabbed the mother in her stomach. Her son died from wounds inflicted by the perpetrator when he tried to fend off the attack. The perpetrator then proceeded to stab himself in the stomach.

His 23-year-old companion was initially arrested as an accessory to murder, but later released. On 31 August 2015, the companion was cleared of all charges.

Swedish police were silent about the case, which is standard procedure during criminal investigations in Sweden to prevent potential contamination of evidence, such as witness testimony. Information usually only becomes public after indictment, when the preliminary investigation is finished. A spokesperson for the police did however say that incident did not appear to have been an act of terrorism, and it did not have an obvious political or religious motive.

== Perpetrator ==
Abraham Ukbagabir (born 1979) confessed to the attack, three days later, in a court hearing via telephone from his hospital bed. He had fled Eritrea in 2005 after fifteen years of forced military service. He spent several years in Italy, where he was granted temporary residence, and briefly travelled to England, where he was denied asylum. In 2013, he immigrated to Sweden.

Ukbagabir remained for a period in hospital, watched by security guards, prison officers and under police surveillance. The district court ordered that he should undergo a full psychiatric assessment. The police expected to interview up to 600 people. Ukbagabir was judged to not have any mental disorder, though it was acknowledged that he displayed a flat affect and claimed to have experienced a vision of God and Moses in 2009.

In October 2015, Ukbagabir was found guilty of two first degree murders and was sentenced to life, as well as permanent extradition. Svea Court of Appeal confirmed the sentence in December 2015. Ukbagabir told in court that he felt treated unfairly when his appeal for asylum was rejected and he decided to kill someone as revenge, saying he targeted people he believed were Swedish to receive as much attention as possible.

While at Kumla Prison, Ukbagabir was attacked and injured by fellow prisoners on multiple occasions requiring hospital care.

== Reactions ==
Following the attack, the Västerås IKEA temporarily closed and then suspended the sale of knives out of concern for the staff. Rumours about the attack ran rampant on social media. A particularly widespread rumour was that the perpetrator was Somali and had been heard shouting "Allahu Akbar" after decapitating the victims. The police refused to address any rumours, citing confidentiality during the preliminary investigation. This led to a debate about Swedish journalism ethics and lack of references in news based on race and religion versus the alternative media and their lack of ethics.

On August 13, three days after the attack, the police were forced to break up an illegal demonstration outside the asylum centre where Ukbagabir had lived. A group of about ten men carrying symbols of an extreme-right wing youth organization held anti-immigration placards, shouted anti-Arab slogans and threw eggs at the building. Two days later, the asylum centre closed down after police found two bags of flammable liquid nearby.

== Aftermath ==
The murders came at a time when public debate on questions of immigration and immigrant integration were becoming increasingly heated in Sweden, Scandinavia, and all of Europe. In the immediate aftermath of the murders, online rumors flew about possible Islamic motivations of the perpetrators, but Eva Morén, assistant prosecutor for the Västmanland District Court, told The Washington Post that both Ukbagabir and his companion were Christian.

Sweden Democrats MP Björn Söder referenced the Ikea murders in a Facebook post and called on Swedes to consign their long-standing "sjuklöverns" ("seven-clover", disparaging term for the mainstream parties) approach to immigration to the "trash heap." Some MPs from other parties accused him of using the Ikea stabbings to push an anti-migrant agenda and raised questions about his fitness to serve as second deputy speaker of the Riksdag.

== See also ==
- 2015 Gothenburg pub shooting
- Trollhättan school attack
- Killing of Alexandra Mezher
