= Code for Africa =

Data journalism nonprofit

- Code for Africa
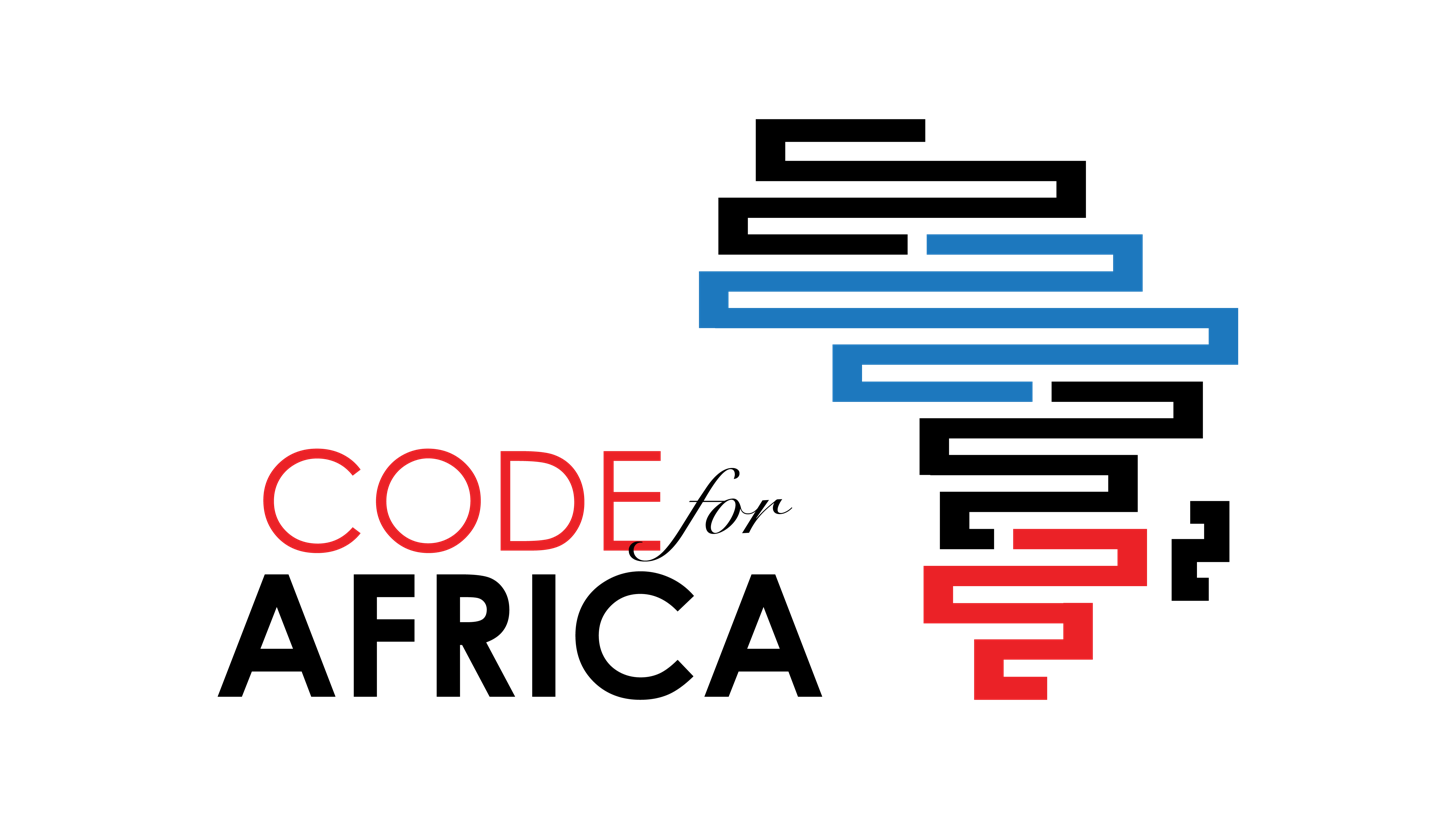
- CfA Logo
- Pronunciation: kowd faw a-fruh-kuh (British pronunciation)
- Formation: 2012
- Founded at: Nairobi Kenya
- Type: Nonprofit; NGO
- Headquarters: Cape Town, South Africa Nairobi, Kenya Abuja, Nigeria Lagos, Nigeria Kampala, Uganda
- Region served: Burkina Faso, Burundi, Cameroon, Central African Republic, Ethiopia, Ghana, Guinea, Ivory Coast, Kenya, Mali, Morocco, Niger, Nigeria, Senegal, Sierra Leone, South Africa, Sudan, Tanzania, Uganda, Zimbabwe
- Services: Data journalism, Fact-checking, Content development, Mooc development, Training and event coordination
- Official language: English, and French
- CEO: Justin Arenstein
- Website: https://codeforafrica.org/

Code for Africa is a non profit African network of digital democracy laboratories and data journalism, with its Secreteriats in Nairobi, Cape Town, Nigeria, and Tanzania. It has teams and partners in 21 African Countries, providing Citizens with actionable information to make informed decisions that enhances civic engagement for improved public governance and accountability.

== Background ==
Code for Africa was founded by Justin Arenstein in 2012 to develop resources to make data more accessible. Code for Africa creates projects and training to enable data journalism and make fact-checking and forensic data analysis tools accessible to journalists and citizens. Code for Africa also organizes trainings for data journalism.

In 2015, Code for Africa received $4.7m from the Bill & Melinda Gates Foundation to fund data projects in Kenya, Nigeria, South Africa and Tanzania on health and development journalism.

In 2016, Code for Africa launched impactAFRICA Data Journalism Fund worth $500,000 with the International Center for Journalists, and funding from Bill & Melinda Gates Foundation, and the World Bank.

In 2017, Google announced a training in collaboration with Code for Africa and World Bank for data journalism. In 2019, the Nigeria's National Bureau of Statistics worked with Code for Africa in the publication of data as open data. During the 2020 COVID-19 pandemic, Deutsche Welle partnered with Code for Africa to set up fact-checking in various Kenyan media houses through it PesaCheck initiative.

== Fellowships ==
Code For Africa offers specialized part-time and remote fellowships focusing on civic data, digital investigation, and ethical AI in Southern Africa.Recent programs include the Inclusion fellowships in collaboration with African Wikipedian Alliance and the Norwegian embassy focusing on LGBTQ,Rights, Xenophobic practices,climate change and justice and the upcoming South African local municipal elections. Others are Civic Graph Fellowship, Lexicon Fellowship for NLP practitioners, and Media Sentinel Fellowships targeting information integrity and elections. These fellowships targets Botswana, eSwatini,Lesotho and South Africa.

== See also ==
- Code for America
- Civic technology
