= AI-generated violent extremist content =

An example of an AI-generated video glorifying the perpetrator of the 2024 Abundant Life Christian School shooting. The "–2" is a reference to the number of victims killed in the shooting.

The rise of generative artificial intelligence has seen the technology used to create content promoting violence, terrorist attacks, and mass killings. Since 2025, experts observed a trend towards using readily available AI tools to produce video content that normalizes or glorifies violence and targets young audiences on social media platforms.

== Forms of extremist AI-generated content ==
=== Use of Viggle AI ===
Viggle AI is a Chinese artificial intelligence-based image-to-video platform. It allows users to place people or fictional characters from images into reference videos and transform static images into animated videos, including an AI Dance Generator. Viggle AI was launched in March 2024 by founder and CEO Chu Hang, a former employee of Google, Nvidia, Facebook, and Autodesk. By February 2026, the platform had surpassed 40 million users.

A 2026 article published by the Global Network on Extremism and Technology described a trend involving the use of Viggle AI to create videos of mass murderers dancing at the locations of their attacks, often alongside references to the demographic targeted by the attack and the number of people killed. According to the article, videos such as these, while not outright inciting murder, contribute to the normalization of violence.

=== Fruit and vegetable gore content ===
One "genre" of AI-generated violent extremist content involves videos of anthropomorphic fruits and vegetables being subjected to violence, torture, and hyper-realistic killings, while using aesthetics that feature bright colors, cartoon characters, and Pixar-style animation to conceal the disturbing nature of the content.

=== Minion AI ===
A trend of violent AI-generated content that got popular on apps like TikTok around December 2024. These are videos where gore and other types of shock content are edited with AI programs like Runway to replace people with minions.

== 2026 Tumbler Ridge shooting ==
The perpetrator of the 2026 Tumbler Ridge shooting, eighteen-year-old Jesse Van Rootselaar, had extensively described various scenarios involving gun violence to ChatGPT before the shooting. The interactions were flagged as "gun violence activity and planning" by OpenAI's automated abuse detection system, and a security team recommended notifying Canadian law enforcement after reviewing the logs, viewing them as indicative of an "imminent risk of serious harm to others."

OpenAI's management rejected the security team's recommendation, suspending Van Rootselaar's account for violating the company's terms of service but choosing to not contact law enforcement because they assessed the conversations to not meet their threshold of a "credible and imminent" threat.

After being blocked, Van Rootselaar created a second account and continued her conversations with ChatGPT; this account was not detected by OpenAI until after the attack took place.

== See also ==
- Online youth radicalization
- Online extremism
