= Tessy Igomu =

Nigerian editor and journalist

- Citizenship: Nigeria
- Occupation: Journalist
- Employer: The Punch The Sun Newspaper
- Awards: Journalist of the Year at the West Africa Media Excellence Conference and Awards (WAMECA); award-winning story highlighted the environmental and health hazards; ranked as the seventh most powerful woman in journalism by Women in Journalism Africa,

Tessy Igomu is a Nigerian journalist and head of Investigation at The Punch newspaper. In 2022, she became the first female to win the West Africa Journalist of the Year 2022 at the West Africa Media Excellence Conference and Awards (WAMECA).

== Career ==
Igomu began her journalism career at The Sun Newspaper in 2007, where she worked as a reporter and later as Assistant Features Editor. In 2020, she joined The Punch, initially contributing to the Investigative Desk and later taking on the role of Editor for Punch Healthwise, a platform focusing on public health and development issues across Africa. Her investigative work has led to significant societal impacts, including the relocation of a Chinese-owned recycling company in Ogun State following her exposé on its pollution of a local community.

== Awards and recognition ==
In 2022, Igomu was honored as the West Africa Journalist of the Year at the West Africa Media Excellence Conference and Awards (WAMECA), becoming the first female to receive this accolade in the award's history. Her award-winning story highlighted the environmental and health hazards posed by Yoyo Resources Recycling Limited in Orimerunmu, Ogun State. In 2024, she was ranked as the seventh most powerful woman in journalism by Women in Journalism Africa, marking an improvement from her eighth-place position in 2023.
