= Maura Ajak =

South Sudanese investigative journalist (born 1989)

- Born: Maura Metbeni Paul Ajak; 1989 (age 36–37); Wau, South Sudan
- Education: University of Juba
- Occupation: Journalist
- Years active: 2014–present

Maura Metbeni Paul Ajak (born 1989) is an investigative South Sudanese journalist, broadcaster and camerawoman.

She started being a journalist in 2014 when she joined the Catholic Radio Network. Born and raised in South Sudan, a country recovering from years of devastations caused by civil wars and ranked 144th out of 180 countries on the World Press Freedom Index (ref:2018), Ajak is internationally known for her freelance investigative stories uncovering human rights violations, corruption and the environmental impacts of climate change and the conducts of oil companies in the country which sees ordinary people finding themselves drinking water mixed with oil. In May 2017, her employer, the Catholic Radio Network, scooped an anti- corruption award and Ajak was awarded a certificate of recognition at the event as one of the two best journalists holding the South Sudanese government accountable.

In September 2018, several soldiers belonging to the Sudan People's Liberation Army (SPLA) were sentenced for rape and murder by the country's military court after Ajak exposed them. The court ordered the South Sudanese government to pay each of the rape victims - some of whom were as young as 11-years of age - an amount of $4,000.

== Achievements and awards ==
- In September 2018, Ajak was awarded the Human Rights Defender Award for exposing and helping in sentencing several soldiers belonging to the Sudan People's Liberation Army (SPLA) for rape and murder by the country's military court and the government was ordered to compensate victims.
- In May 2017, recognized by the Catholic Radio Network as one of two best journalists for anti‑corruption reporting
- Awarded Human Rights Defender status in 2017 by the South Sudanese civil society group Community Empowerment for Progress Organization (CEPO)
- Won the African Women in Media “Pitch Zone” Award in 2020 for work on peace and governance.
- Received recognition from the IGAD Climate Prediction and Application Centre (ICPAC) as “Earth Champion” for East Africa in 2020

=== Leadership roles ===
- Chairperson, South Sudan Chapter of Women in News, elected November 2023
- Appointed Peace Ambassador for East Africa by the IGAD Centre for Preventing and Countering Violent Extremism (ICEPCVE) in June 2023

== Works and challenges ==
- Highlighted the mixing of oil with drinking water due to climate-driven flooding in South Sudan for BBC Africa Eye
- Covered the post-war integration and human conditions of soldiers for Associated Press, including a report on crowded camps and food shortages.
- Authored AP dispatches, such as reporting on the formation of the coalition government in February 2020

=== Challenges ===
In 2018, while covering the detention of an Al Jazeera reporter, Maura and colleagues were threatened and had equipment confiscated by security agents in parliament. South Sudan ranked 144th out of 180 on Reporters Without Borders’ World Press Freedom Index during her early career.
