= Justin Arenstein =

South African journalist and media innovator

- Born: Justin Arenstein; 1970 (age 55–56); South Africa
- Occupations: Journalist, media technological innovator, strategist, media freedom activist
- Writing career
- Language: English
- Notable works: African Eye News Service, MPowerFM, Code for Africa, PesaCheck
- Notable awards: 1997 South African Courageous Journalism Award (Ruth First Memorial Trust), 2000 Knight International Journalism Award
- Literary movement: International Center for Journalists

Justin Arenstein (born 1970) is a South African journalist, media freedom activist and an internationally recognized innovative media expert. He founded and published Mpumalanga's first investigative news agency, the African Eye News Service (AENS), in 1994. He is the co-founder and CEO of Code for Africa. Before his founding of AENS in 1994, Arenstein was working for Caxton Publishers and was dismissed after protesting the unequal salaries of white and black journalists at the media house.

All of South Africa's media houses had subscriptions with Arenstein's AENS and his investigative news articles appeared in magazines, newspapers and news websites across South Africa, including Mail and Guardian, News24 and Daily Maverick.

He is a Knight fellow of the International Center for Journalists (ICFJ) and was also the 2009 – 2010 Knight Fellow at Stanford University for ICFJ.

He is also the co‐founder of South Africa's first urban magazines that were operated through the HomeGrown Magazines brand and also established Mpumalanga's first commercial radio station, the MPowerFM. He served on the boards of the Press Council of South Africa, the Open Democracy Advice Center, and was a consultant for Google on digital journalism.

His Code for Africa is the African continent's largest network of digital journalism data that operates forensic labs in 21 African countries, supplying everything from drones and sensors to data analysis and open-source intelligence investigation. It also runs one of Africa's fact-checking network, the PesaCheck, and the counter-disinformation research center named iLab.
