= Gig bag =

Bag for storage and transport of musical instruments

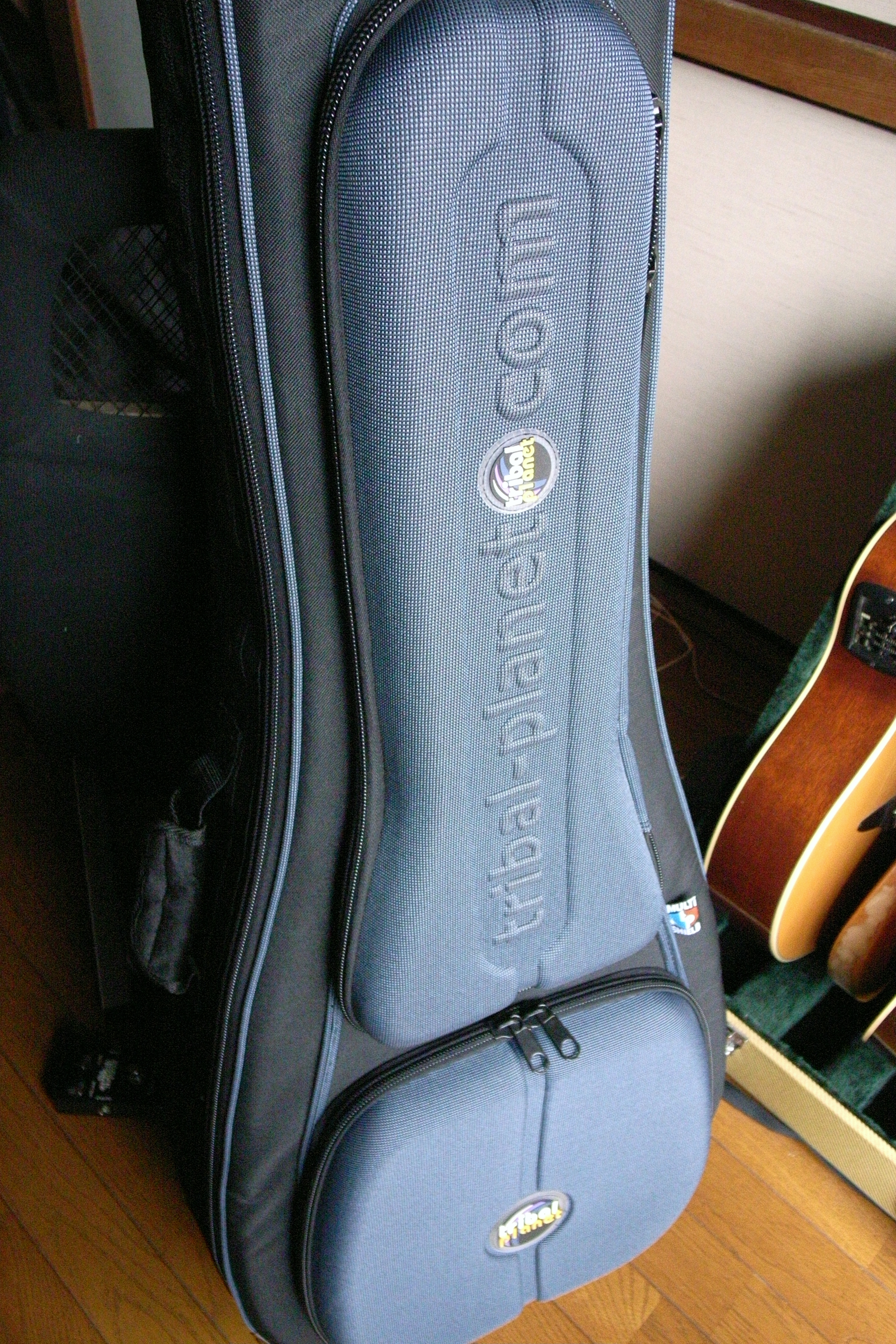
A typical gig bag ...

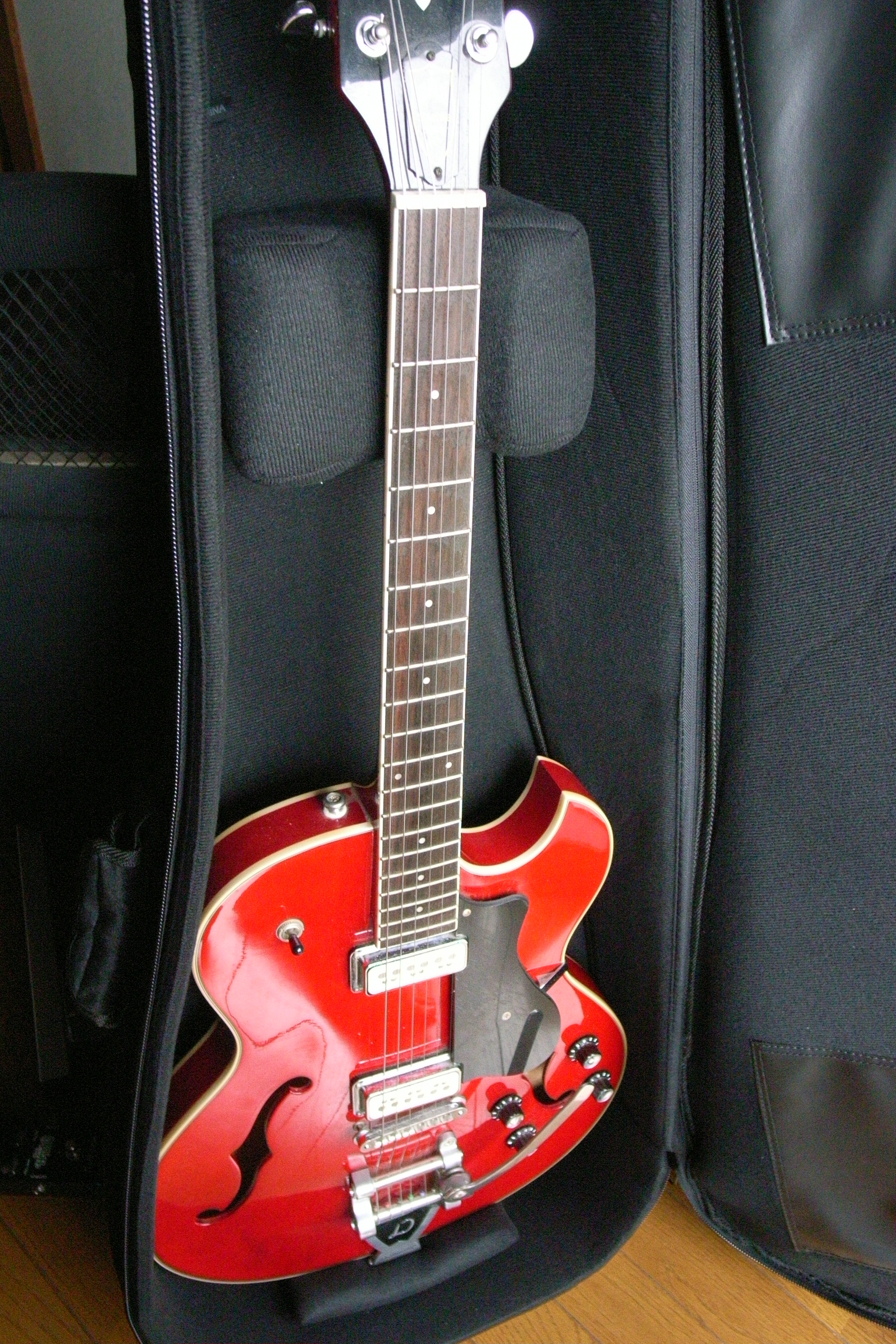
and its inside

A gig bag (or gigbag) is a padded, soft-sided bag used for the storage and transport of musical instruments, most commonly a guitar or bass guitar. A popular alternative to the usually heavier, more cumbersome hard shell cases, most gig bags include pockets for storage of sheet music, instrument cables, picks, straps, and other accessories, along with shoulder straps and grab handles for added comfort, portability, and ease of use.

Larger gig bags are used for the double bass.

While gig bags are lighter and easier to carry, they offer much less protection than padded hard shell or wooden cases. As such, some musicians will own both soft gig bags and hard shell cases for their instruments. This way, they can use the gig bag for local rehearsals, session work, and gigs, and use the hard shell case if their instrument will be checked onto airline baggage.

== Citations ==
- Rodgers, Jeffrey Pepper (2001) [1964], Lynn, Stacey; Solondz, Simone (eds.), Beginning Guitarist's Handbook, Published by David A. Lusterman, San Anselmo: String Letter Publishing, ISBN 9781890490454, OCLC 46777533
- Washington, Julie (21 August 2013), Survival Kit, Micheal L. Blake, archived from the original on 14 August 2016
- Sandberg, Larry (9 October 2014), Tips for Choosing the Perfect Guitar Gig Bag, Guitar World, archived from the original on 11 September 2014
