= Lars Nyberg =

Swedish businessman (born 1951)

Lars Gunnar Nyberg (born December 7, 1951) is a Swedish businessman. He was the CEO of NCR Corporation from 1995 through 2003, as well as the CEO of TeliaSonera from 2007 to February 1, 2013.

== Business ==
Prior to joining NCR, Nyberg was with Philips Electronics NV for 20 years in a number of senior positions. Most recently, he was chairman and CEO of Philips' Communications Systems Division. Nyberg also serves on the boards of directors of The Sandvik Group in Sweden and Wisconsin-based Snap-on Incorporated. In July 2007 he was appointed to CEO of TeliaSonera.
