= Guldspaden =

The Golden Shovel Award (Swedish: Guldspaden) is an annual Swedish journalism award for investigative journalism.

Dating from 1991, it is awarded by the non-profit organization Föreningen Grävande Journalister (Swedish Association of Investigative Journalism which is part of Global Investigative Journalism Network).

Prizes are awarded to the country’s best investigative reporters.

The prize includes a spade statue in bronze designed and created by sculptor and artist Mats Lodén.
