= Stephen Grey =

British investigative journalist (1968-)

- Born: April 1968
- Occupation: Investigative journalist
- Employer: Reuters
- Works: Secrecy for Sale: Inside the Global Offshore Money Maze, Panama Papers, Swiss Leaks
- Awards: Redkollegia (The West Has Banned the Sale of Components for Weapons Production to Russia. But Russia Is Still Buying Them, 2022); The Joe And Laurie Dine Award (2007); Gerald Loeb Award (2023)
- Website: https://www.stephengrey.com/

Stephen Grey (born 1968 in Rotterdam, Netherlands) is a British investigative journalist and special correspondent for Reuters. He received the 2006 Joe and Laurie Dine Award from the Overseas Press Club for his book Ghost Plane: The True Story of the CIA Torture Program.

== Investigation into CIA 'rendition' ==
"When the truth comes out, positive things happen [...] This is our motivation and that’s why people take risks to bring out the truth. It’s the great adventure."

— Stephen Grey

In the summer of 2003, Grey began investigating reports of the CIA's secret system of extraordinary renditions (transfer of terror suspects to foreign jails, where many faced torture). The results of his research were first published in the New Statesman in an article headlined 'America's Gulag' in May 2004. After finding how to track the movements of alleged CIA planes used for rendition, he published the first flight logs of these jets in The Sunday Times in November 2004. He went on to contribute to several front-page news articles to The New York Times about rendition and security issues, as well as to Newsweek, CBS 60 Minutes, Le Monde Diplomatique, and BBC Radio 4's File on Four. He presented television documentaries on the CIA rendition program for Channel 4's Dispatches Program and PBS Frontline World.

In 2005, he received the Amnesty International UK Media Award for best article in a periodical, for his New Statesman article.

In 2006, he received the Joe and Laurie Dine award for Best International Reporting in any medium dealing with human rights from the Overseas Press Club of America. The citation described his book, Ghost Plane, as

the consummation of years of investigation, not only by the author, but, as he acknowledges, the informal global network of journalists with whom he collaborated to reveal the murky world of rendition, extraordinary rendition and proxy torture. By tracing the landings and takeoffs of clumsily concealed CIA flights, his work not only demonstrates concerned investigative journalism in action, it lifts the lid on a global gulag of prisons and torture chambers, assembled by US officials in defiance of domestic and international human rights law.

In a broadcast on the BBC World Service on 30 December 2009, reviewing the last ten years of journalism, author and campaigner Heather Brooke described Grey's investigation of the CIA rendition flights as the "journalistic scoop of the decade."

== Afghanistan reports ==
In 2009, he also published his second book, Operation Snakebite, an account of the war in Helmand, Afghanistan, centring on the December 2007 operation by British, American and Afghan troops to recapture the town of Musa Qala, a battle which Grey reported as an embedded reporter for the Sunday Times of London. A Channel 4 Dispatches film reported by Grey titled "Afghanistan: Mission Impossible" was short-listed for a Royal Television Society Award for independent film-maker of 2009.

In 2009 and 2010, he returned to Afghanistan, reporting for, among other publications, The Sunday Times, Le Monde Diplomatique, and Channel 4 News, the latter of which reported on criticism that the United States was arming 'militias' to take on the Taliban.

He criticised the Ministry of Defence's attempts to keep journalists away from the Afghanistan front lines, saying it was "making truth a casualty of war".

== Books ==
- Ghost Plane: The True Story of the CIA Torture Program. New York: St. Martin's Press, 2006.
- Operation Snakebite: The Explosive True Story of an Afghan Desert Siege. London: Viking Penguin, 2009.
- The New Spymasters: Inside the Modern World of Espionage from the Cold War to Global Terror. New York: St. Martin's Press, 2015.
