= Stora Journalistpriset =

- Awarded for: "to recognize achievement in journalism"
- Country: Sweden
- Presented by: Bonnier AB
- First award: 1966
- Website: http://www.storajournalistpriset.se/

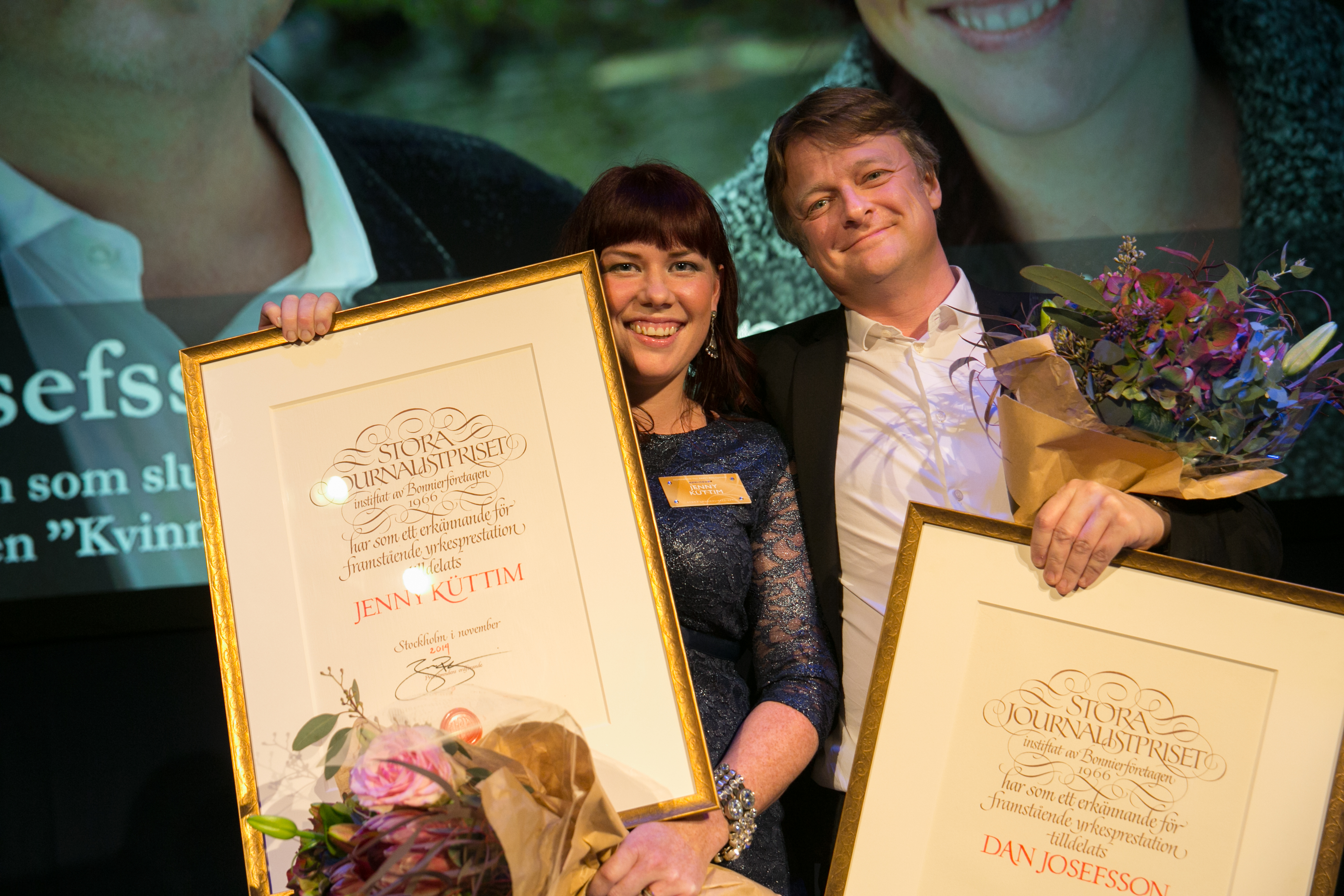
Journalists Dan Josefsson and Jenny Kuttim, winners of the Stora Journalistpriset, 2014

Stora Journalistpriset ("The Swedish Grand Prize for Journalism") is an annual Swedish award, founded in 1966 by Bonnier AB, given to "recognize achievement in journalism".

The prize money is SEK 100,000 and is awarded in four categories:

- Scoop of the Year (Årets Avslöjande)
- Storyteller of the Year (Årets Berättare)
- Innovator of the Year (Årets Förnyare)
- Lukas Bonnier's Grand Prize for Journalism (Lukas Bonniers Stora Journalistpris)

== History ==
The award was established in 1966 by the will of Albert Bonnier, Jr. From the beginning the award was given in two categories: "daily press" and "other periodical press". In 1969 a third category for radio and television was added. In 1979 the category "other periodical press" was split into two separate categories for weekly magazines and special/organization magazines, while the category "radio and television" was split into two separate categories as well (one for each media).

In 1992, the "Lukas Bonnier’s Grand Prize for Journalism" (Lukas Bonniers Stora Journalistpris) was added as a category, which is awarded for long-time eminent professional achievements in journalism.

In 1998 the categories for magazines were again merged into one category with the name "New Media" (Nya medier).

In 2002 the format of the awards was completely changed, as the separate categories for each type of media were abolished in favour of the new categories "Investigation of the Year" (Årets Avslöjande), "Storyteller of the Year" (Årets Berättare), "Innovator of the Year" (Årets Förnyare) and the "Lukas Bonnier’s Grand Journalism Prize" (Lukas Bonniers Stora Journalistpris).

In 2001 an equivalent award was established in Finland, known as Suuri Journalistipalkinto. Equivalent awards have also been given for some years in the Baltic states and Russia.
