= District court =

Category of courts

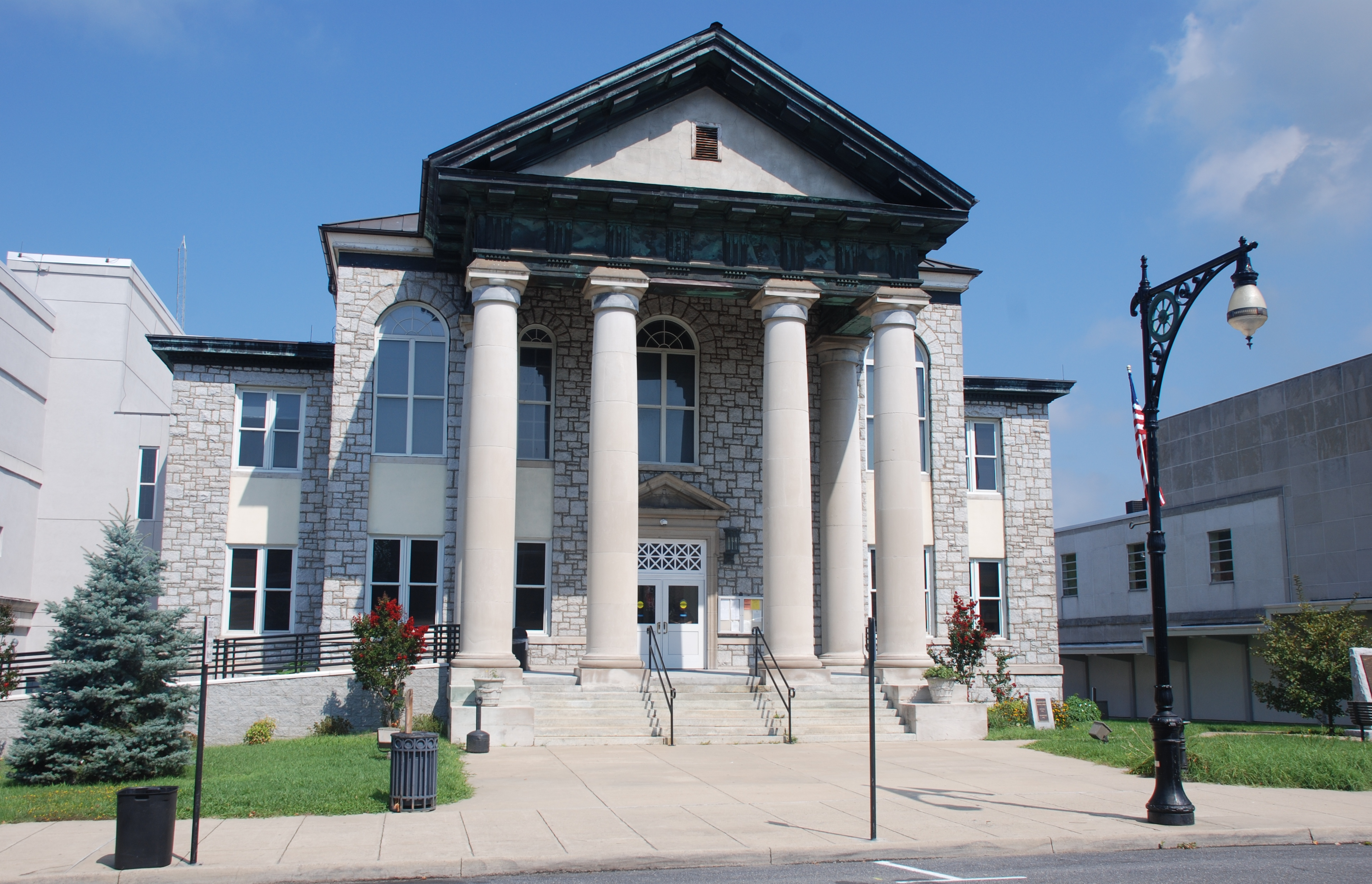
Allegheny General District Court, Covington, Virginia.

District courts are a category of courts which exists in several nations. Sometimes they are called "small case courts" because they are usually at the lowest level of the hierarchy.

These courts generally work under a higher court which exercises control over the lower court and supervises it.

== Americas ==
=== United States ===
In the United States federal courts, the United States district courts are the general trial courts. The federal district courts have jurisdiction over federal questions (trials and cases interpreting the Constitution, Federal law, or which involve federal statutes or crimes) and diversity (cases otherwise subject to jurisdiction in a state trial court but which are between litigants of different states and/or countries). There are 89 federal districts in the 50 states. United States district courts also exist in Puerto Rico, the Virgin Islands, the District of Columbia, Guam, and the Northern Mariana Islands. In total, there are 94 U.S. district courts. Decisions from these courts are subject to review by one of the 13 United States court of appeals, which are, in turn, subject to review by the Supreme Court of the United States.

Some states maintain state courts called "district courts." In Florida, the Florida District Courts of Appeal are intermediate appellate courts. In Texas, the Texas District Courts are trial courts of general jurisdiction, hearing all felony and divorce cases, election controversies, and many civil matters. The Hawaii State District Courts, and those in Alaska, New York, and Kentucky, to name a few, are courts of limited jurisdiction.

== Asia and Oceania ==
=== Australia ===
District court is the name given to the intermediate court in most Australian states. They hear indictable (serious) criminal offences excluding treason, murder and, in some states, manslaughter. Their civil jurisdiction is also intermediate, typically being for civil disputes where the amount claimed is greater than a $75 000 but less than $750 000. The limits vary between Australian states. In Victoria, the equivalent court is called the County Court. Below them are the magistrates' courts, known as the Local Court in New South Wales. Above them are the state supreme courts.

=== Cyprus ===
The District Courts are courts of first instance for civil matters (except those which are dealt with by special courts) and criminal cases involving prison sentences of five years of less. There are six such courts.

=== Hong Kong ===
The District Court in Hong Kong, established in 1953, has limited jurisdiction in both civil and criminal matters. With effect from 1 December 2003, it has civil jurisdiction to hear monetary claims up to HK$1 million or, where the claims are for recovery of land, the annual rent or rateable value does not exceed HK$240,000. In its criminal jurisdiction, the court may try the more serious cases, with the main exceptions of murder, manslaughter and rape. The maximum term of imprisonment it may impose is seven years. There are one Chief District Judge and 30 District Judges, among which three district judges sit in the Family Court and two district judges sit in the Lands Tribunal as Presiding Officers.

=== India ===
The district courts of India are presided over by a judge. They administer justice in India at a district level. These courts are under administrative and judicial control of the high court of the state to which the district concerned belongs.

=== Indonesia ===
The district courts of Indonesia are part of public courts for all cases non-related to religion, constitutions or military matters. The decisions of guilt or innocence are made by a panel of three judges led by a chair judge.

=== Israel ===
The district courts in Israel serve both as the appellate courts and also as the court of first instance for some cases (e.g. real estate or IP). In criminal matters, they try cases where the accused faces a penalty of at least seven years imprisonment. As of 2007, there are six district courts:

- Jerusalem
- Tel Aviv
- Haifa
- Nazareth
- Central Region (Lod)
- Beersheba

=== Japan ===
Japan has 50 district courts, one in each of the 47 prefectures' capitals, and one in the three cities of Hakodate, Asahikawa and Kushiro on Hokkaido. They are the first court level for most civil and criminal cases. Most cases are held with one judge.

=== New Zealand ===
The District Court of New Zealand deals with all criminal matters other than murder, manslaughter and specified offences such as treason. The court can also hear civil claims up to $350,000. District courts were called magistrates' courts until 1980.

=== Pakistan ===
The district courts of Pakistan are presided over by a senior judge. They administer justice in Pakistan at a district level. These courts are under administrative and judicial control of the high court of the province to which the district concerned belongs.

== Europe ==
=== Austria ===
Austria has some 200 district, or local, courts, which decide minor civil and criminal cases.

=== Denmark ===
Denmark consists of 24 judicial districts, each being served by a district court (Danish: byret, literally meaning "town court"). Each district court serves one or more of the country's 98 municipalities, except that Copenhagen Municipality is divided between two district because of its size. Before 2007, when the number of municipalities was reduced from 271 to 98, there were 82 district courts.

The two high courts (the Eastern and Western) serve as courts of appeal.

=== Finland ===
See also Judicial system of Finland

Finland has 27 district courts, which deal with criminal cases, civil cases and petitionary matters. Since December 1, 1993 these have been called käräjäoikeus in Finnish and tingsrätt in Swedish. Each court is headed by the Chief Judge and other District Judges. In certain cases, the district court may also have lay judges. The cases are handled and resolved either in a session or in chambers. In simple cases decisions can be made by notaries.

=== Germany ===
Germany has 115 regional courts (Landgerichte), which are superior to the local courts (Amtsgerichte) and below the higher regional courts (Oberlandesgerichte).

=== Iceland ===
The district courts are the lowest judicial level in Iceland. There are eight courts operating in separate districts, the District Court of Reykjavík, the District Court of Reykjanes, the District Court of Western Iceland, the District Court of the Westfjords, the District Court of Northwest Iceland, the District Court of Northeast Iceland, the District Court of East Iceland and the District Court of South Iceland. The courts handle all cases in their first instance. Subject to conditions, cases can be appealed to a higher court, ultimately the Supreme Court of Iceland whose conclusions are final.

=== Ireland ===
The District Court in Ireland was established in 1924. The court handles civil claims of up to €15,000 and summary criminal trials (minor offences tried by a judge alone where the maximum penalty is 12 months on indictment in the Circuit Court and the granting of licences for the sale of alcohol.

=== Norway ===
The Norwegian tingrett deals with criminal and civil cases. The term tingrett was introduced in 2002, and replaced the previous terms byrett and herredsrett as designations for district courts.

=== Sweden ===
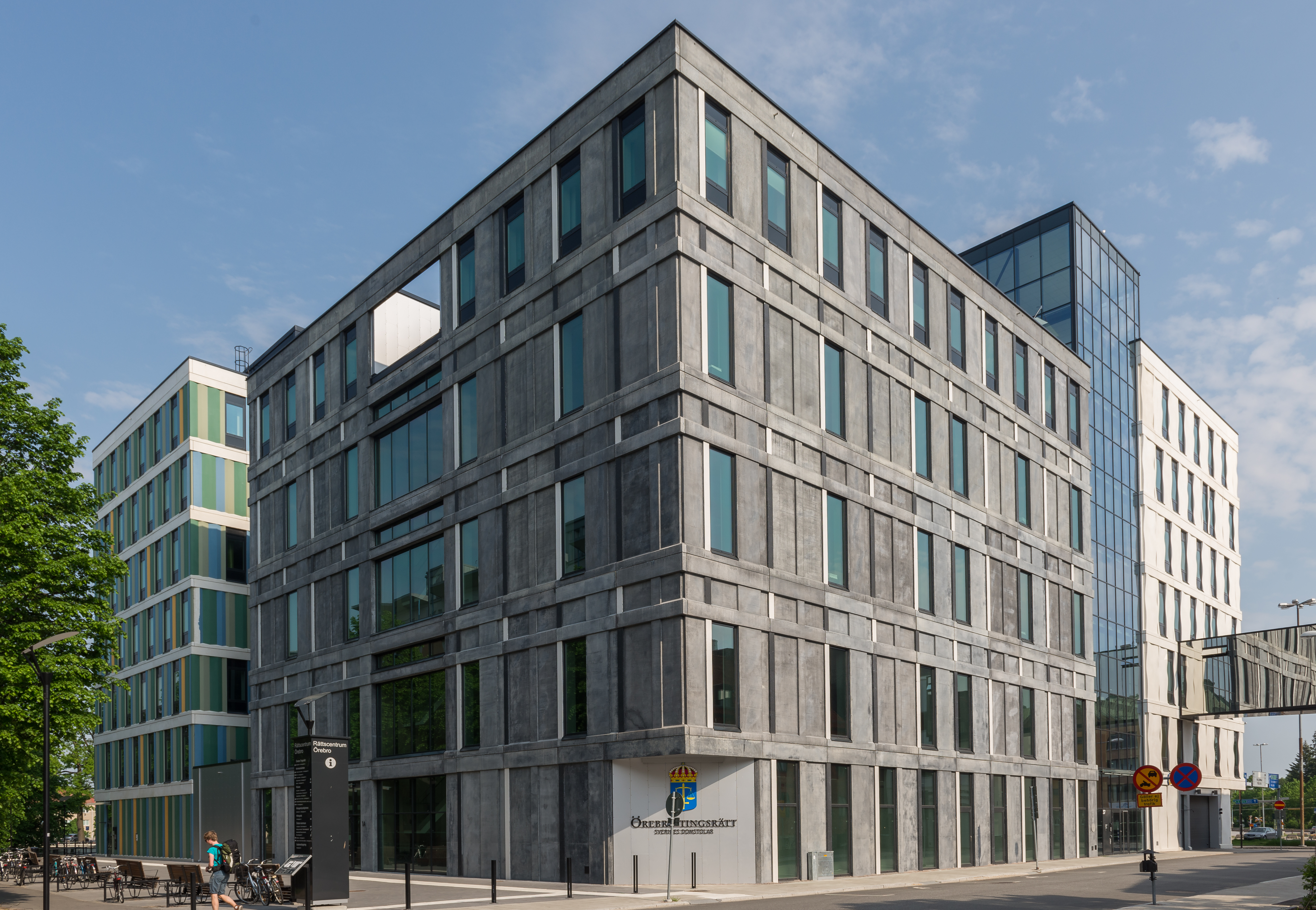
Örebro District Court in Örebro, Sweden

In Sweden, there are 48 district courts (Swedish: tingsrätt); Tingsrätt is also used to describe such courts in Finland and Norway. While relatively recent creations in their current form, the term tingsrätt refers to the ting ("thing"), the ancient term for governing assemblies in these and other Nordic and Germanic countries, where disputes would be brought up to be settled. The specific term tingsrätt was used for courts already in 17th century Sweden, but was later discontinued. It's the court of first instance; dealing with criminal cases, some civil law disputes and a number of non-contentious matters. Private cases against decisions by the public authorities are generally handled by the tingsrätt or the förvaltningsrätt (administrative court), depending on the authority in question.

In 1971, the tingsrätt's became the district courts of Sweden, replacing the previous distinction between rådhusrätt in larger cities and the häradsrätt's for the assize courts of Sweden in other parts of the country. Later reforms have substantially reduced the number of these courts from around 100 to currently (2014) 48.

Appeals against a district court are made to the appellate court (Swedish: hovrätt).

=== United Kingdom ===
==== Scotland ====
District courts were introduced in 1975 as replacement for the burgh police courts; they dealt with the most minor crimes. They were run by the local authorities. Each court comprised one or more justices of the peace (lay magistrates) who sat alone or in threes with a qualified legal assessor as convener or clerk of court.

They handled many cases of breach of the peace, drunkenness, minor assaults, petty theft, and offences under the Civic Government (Scotland) Act 1982.

District courts operated under summary procedure and could not impose a fine in excess of £2,500 or sentence an offender to more than 60 days in prison. In practice, most offences were dealt with by a fine.

District courts in Scotland were abolished and replaced with justice of the peace courts under the provisions of the Criminal Proceedings etc. (Reform) (Scotland) Act 2007. The justice of the peace courts are managed by the Scottish Court Service. Responsibility for the courts was transferred from the local authorities in a rolling programme of court unification which concluded in February 2010. District courts were replaced by JP courts in sheriffdoms as follows:

- Sheriffdom of Lothian and Borders, 10 March 2008
- Sheriffdom of Grampian, Highlands and Islands, 2 June 2008
- Sheriffdom of Glasgow and Strathkelvin, 8 December 2008
- Sheriffdom of Tayside, Central and Fife, 23 February 2009
- Sheriffdom of North Strathclyde, 14 December 2009
- Sheriffdom of South Strathclyde, Dumfries & Galloway, 22 February 2010
