= Assize courts of Sweden =

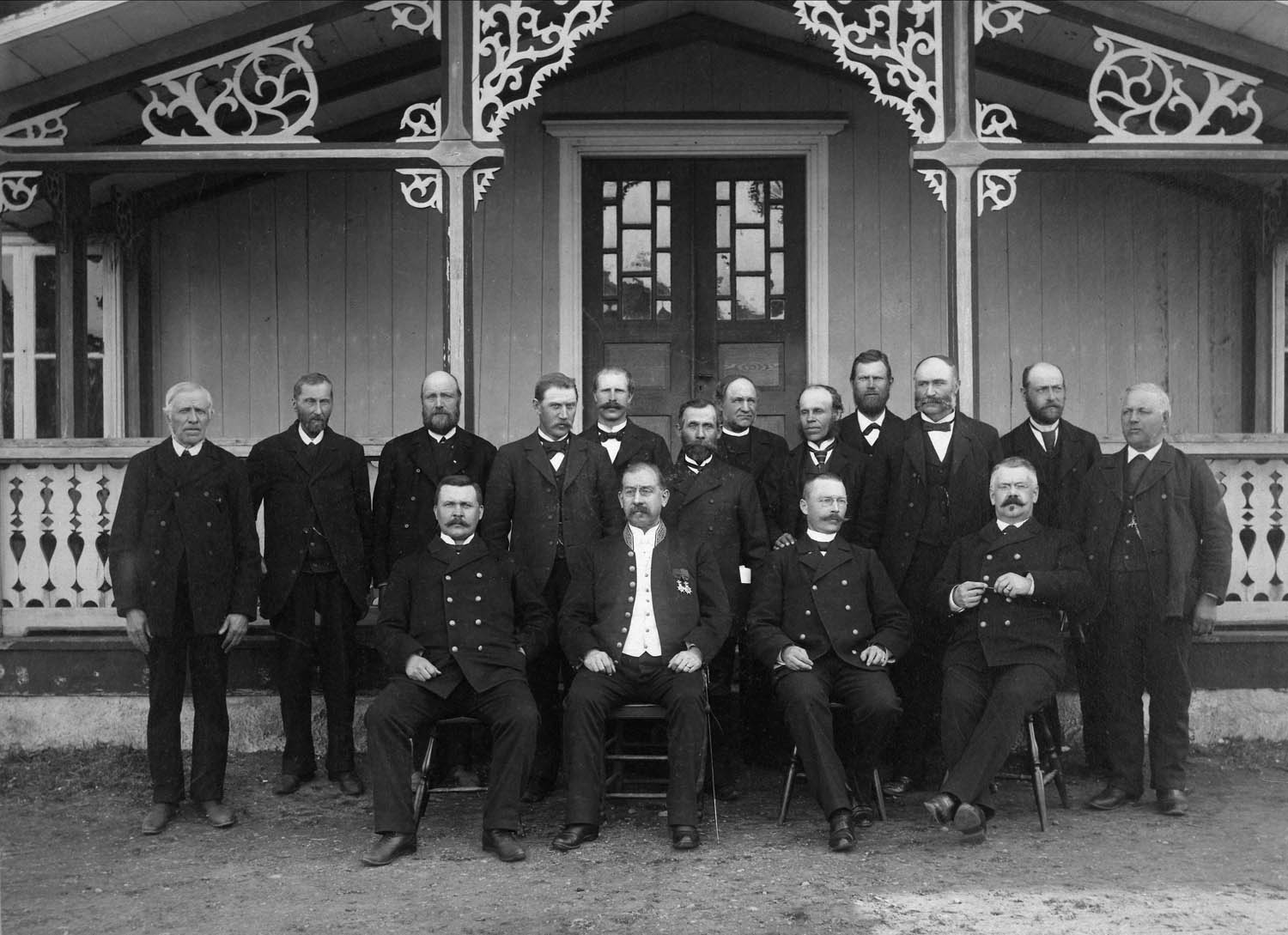
Judges, constables, and lay judges gathered outside the courthouse of the Western Hundred Court, Komstad, Småland

The assize courts of Sweden (Note: häradsrätt: district (circuit, assize) court, [court of] assizes; Södra Roslags domsagas häradsrätt the Assize Court of the Södra Roslag Judicial District.) (Swedish: häradsrätt, lit. 'hundred court', Finnish: kihlakunnanoikeus) were public courts in rural areas and in several cities, which were under county law (landsrätt), until the judicial reform of 1971, when district courts were introduced both in rural areas and in cities. The assize court consisted of a district judge (häradshövding) and a panel. In order for the assize court to have jurisdiction, usually at least seven lay judges had to be present in court. The panel participated in the adjudication of cases in their entirety. Each assize court had a fixed courthouse, usually located within its jurisdiction (judicial district), where the court convened.

== History ==
=== Sweden ===
Assizes existed in Götaland already before the mid-14th century and were introduced in Svealand through Magnus IV's national law. At the assize court, which was the public lower court in rural areas, a panel consisting of the district judge (häradshövding) and twelve members (farmers) residing within the hundred judged in the first instance. To render a judgment at the assize court, it was required that at least seven of the panel members were present. Before 1823, the lay judges were appointed by the senior juryman (häradsdomare). Starting from 1823, farmers were granted the right to vote at the socken meeting. The assize courts convened for sessions called thing, where legal and other issues common to the people were decided. There should be one assize court for each tithing. In 1909, the number of assize courts was 223, namely, 126 under the Svea Court of Appeal, 79 under the Göta Court of Appeal, and 18 under the Scania and Blekinge Court of Appeal. Each assize court was required to hold regular meetings, called ordinary session (general meetings), and also special meetings, called extraordinary session (urtima ting, special or extra meetings), for certain specific cases.

According to the law of 1734, the district judge in each hundred was required to hold court three times a year: the first time in winter, the second time in summer, and the third time in autumn. The court terms were announced to the county governor and proclaimed from all pulpits. If any serious crimes occurred between the regular court terms, an extraordinary court session was called. However, according to specific regulations, the number of court sessions could be reduced according to the needs of different areas; nevertheless, a regular assize court session was always to be held annually in each hundred. By royal ordinance on 17 May 1872, a more continuous operation was prescribed for some assize courts. According to the new organization, which actually applied to judicial districts consisting of one or two tithings, but which could also be prescribed for one or another individual tithing in districts with several tithings upon reconsideration by King in Council, the number of regular court sessions in each tithing was indeed limited to two (spring session and autumn session); however, many more legal proceedings were gained, as in tithings that alone formed a judicial district, the assize court was to hold six sessions during the spring session and four during the autumn session, and in tithings that, together with another, formed a judicial district, the court was to sit in each tithing three times during the spring session and twice during the autumn session; in addition, so-called final sessions could and were usually held, meaning sessions to conclude court matters. Appeals against the assize court judgments were made to the court of appeal.

In 1935, regulations were issued stating that assize courts should hold several regular sessions per year. Finally, in the Code of Judicial Procedure of 1942, it was prescribed that assize courts should hold session once a week. The assize courts were replaced from 1971 onwards by district courts serving as the ordinary courts of first instance.

=== Finland ===
In Finland, by imperial decree of 27 April 1868, the provision that the members of the jury shall be 12 was repealed and the number of lay judges reduced from 7 to 5. The court convened annually for 2 regular sessions, except in the Åland judicial district, where only one session was held annually. Extraordinary sessions were held as needed. The number of assize courts amounted to 234 in 1909.

The assize courts were replaced from 1993 onwards by district courts serving as the ordinary courts of first instance.
