= Hovrätt =

Courts of appeal in Sweden and Finland

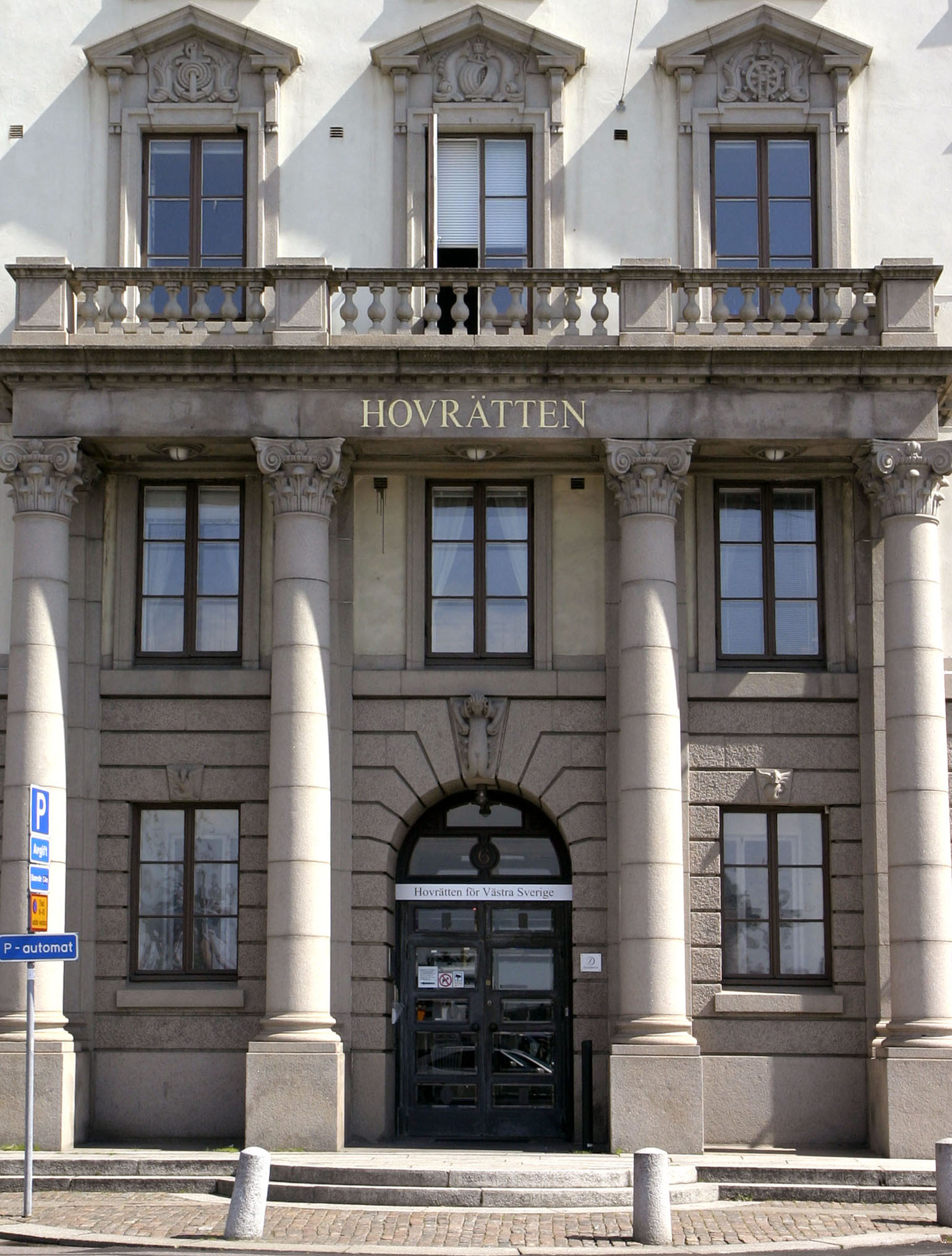
The Court of Appeal for Western Sweden (Hovrätten för Västra Sverige) in Gothenburg.

The courts of appeal in Sweden and in Finland, also known as hovrätt in Swedish and hovioikeus in Finnish, deal with appeals against decisions of the district courts. They also are responsible for supervising the operations of the district courts in their judicial district.

The courts of appeal in Sweden were the highest judicial body until King Gustav III founded the Supreme Court of Sweden in 1789. Today, these courts function mostly as appellate courts. They are the second highest general courts in both Sweden and Finland. There are six courts of appeal in Sweden, and five in Finland.

== History ==
The first hovrätt, Svea Court of Appeal, was founded 1614 in Stockholm. In Finland, then part of Sweden, the court in Turku was founded in 1623 by Gustavus Adolphus, mainly because it was difficult to travel from Finland to Stockholm.

During the Swedish Empire imperial era, additional courts of appeal were introduced in order to relieve the original Svea hovrätt. Göta Court of Appeal was the second such court in Sweden proper, established in Jönköping in 1634. It was preceded by the court in Turku (1623) and the court in Tartu (1630), cities which during this era were part of the dominions of Sweden.

== Current appellate courts ==
These are the current courts of appeal in Swedish and Finnish judiciary:

=== Sweden ===
| Name | Seat |
|---|---|
| Svea Court of Appeal | Stockholm |
| Göta Court of Appeal | Jönköping |
| Scania and Blekinge Court of Appeal | Malmö |
| Court of Appeal for Western Sweden | Gothenburg |
| Court of Appeal for Southern Norrland | Sundsvall |
| Court of Appeal for Northern Norrland | Umeå |

=== Finland ===
The courts of appeal in Finland are:

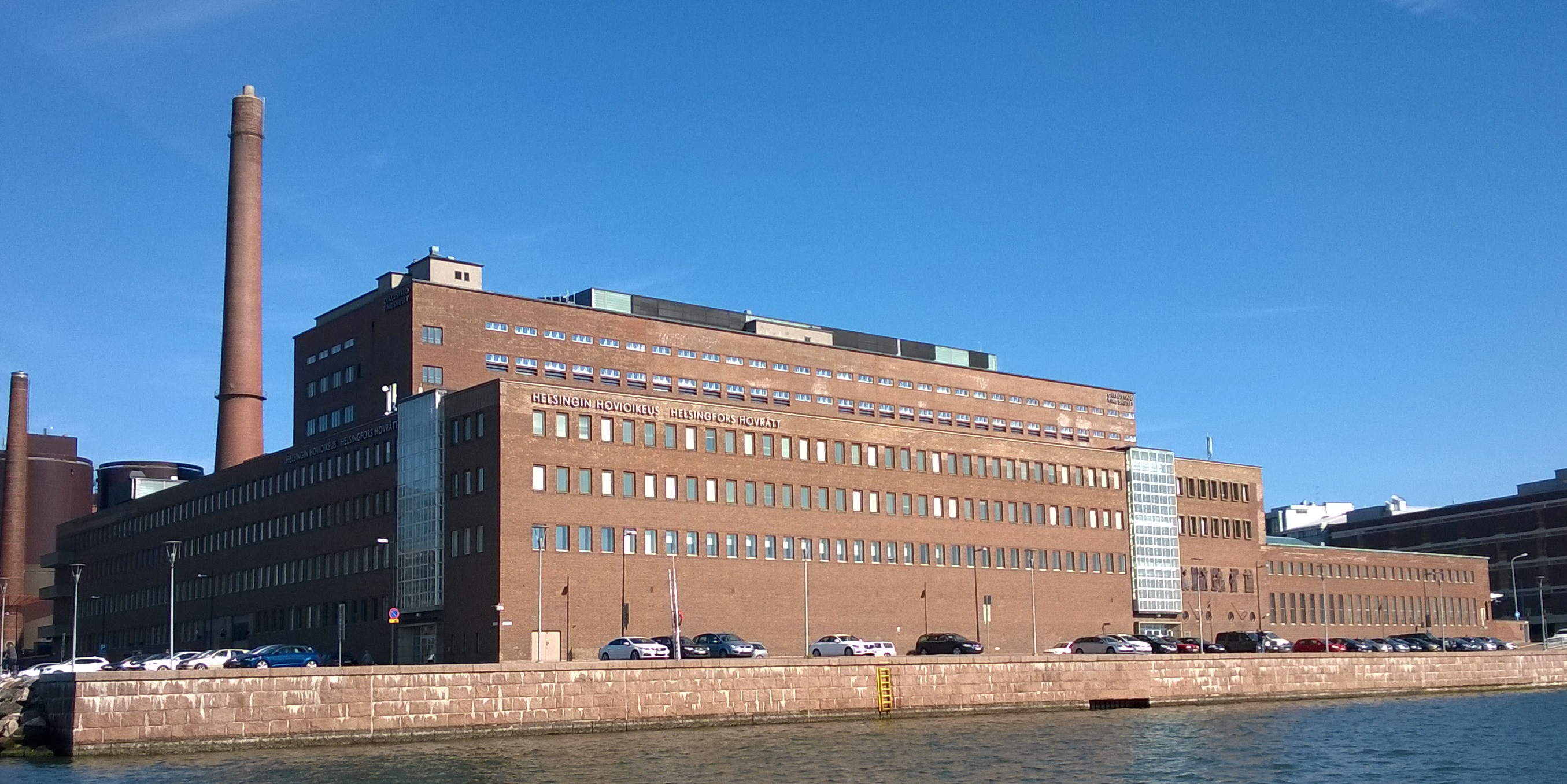
Helsinki Court of Appeal (Helsingin hovioikeus)

- Turun hovioikeus/Åbo hovrätt, founded in 1623 (part of the Swedish judiciary until 1809)
- Vaasan hovioikeus/Vasa hovrätt, founded in 1775 (part of the Swedish judiciary until 1809)
- Itä-Suomen hovioikeus/Östra Finlands hovrätt, former Viipurin hovioikeus/Viborgs hovrätt (now in Kuopio), founded in 1839
- Helsingin hovioikeus/Helsingfors hovrätt, founded in 1952
- Rovaniemen hovioikeus/Rovaniemi hovrätt, founded in 1979

== See also ==
- Hovrättsråd
- Judiciary of Finland
- Judiciary of Sweden
