= Malmö District Court =

Court in Sweden

Coordinates: 55°36′38.8″N 13°0′20.4″E

- Malmö tingsrätt
- Coat of arms.
- Interactive map of Malmö District Court
- Established: 1971
- Location: Malmö, Sweden
- Appeals to: Scania and Blekinge Court of Appeal
- Website: Malmo District Court

Lawspeaker
- Currently: Johan Sjöö

Malmö District Courthouse Malmö tingsrätt
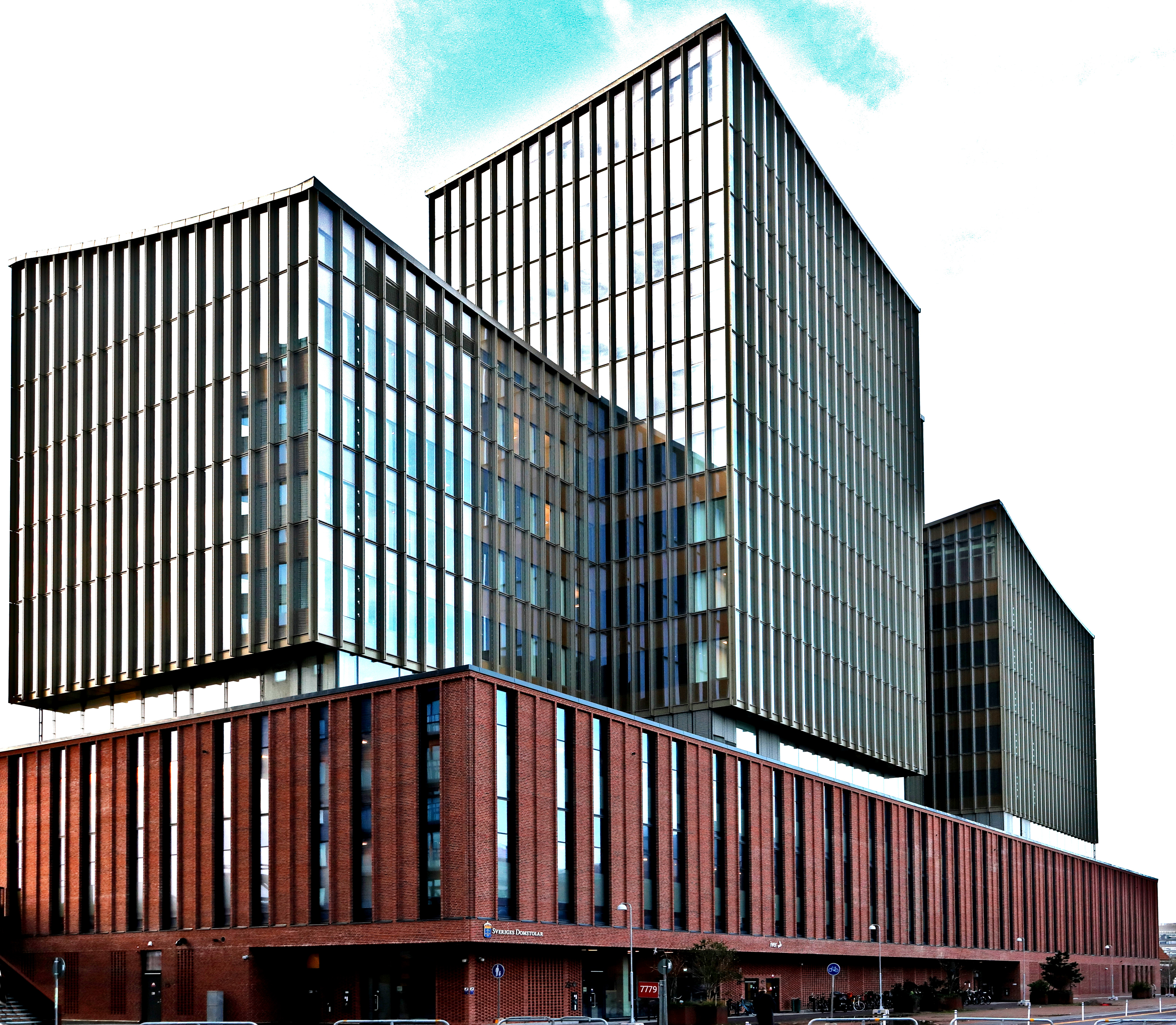
- Interactive map of the Malmö District Courthouse; Malmö tingsrätt area

General information
- Architectural style: Postmodern architecture
- Location: Bangårdsplatsen 2, Malmö, Sweden
- Construction started: 2020
- Completed: 2023
- Client: Swedish National Courts Administration

Design and construction
- Architect: Henning Larsen Architects White Arkitekter

Malmö District Court (Swedish: Malmö tingsrätt) is a law court in Malmö, Sweden whose jurisdiction includes the municipalities of Burlöv, Malmö and Vellinge. Malmö District Court comes under the Court of Appeal for Scania and Blekinge. Malmö District Court is also the court for freedom of the press and freedom of expression cases for Skåne County, the enforcement court for the area corresponding to the former Malmöhus County and the maritime court with jurisdiction established in the Maritime Act. The court is one of the largest district courts in the country and decides around 15 000 cases each year.

The District Court was attached to, and had parts of its activities in Malmö City Hall until 22 June 2023. On 26 June 2023, the District Court moved to a newly constructed court building at Bangårdsplatsen 2. The building is shared with the Administrative court of Malmö and the Rent and Lease Tribunal of Malmö. The District Court's jurisdiction has 420 000 inhabitants.

== Administrative history ==
At the district court reform in 1971, this district court in Malmö was formed from the assize courts of Oxie and Skytt's hundreds' tithing and the Malmö city court, where the Malmö assize court premises, dating from 1970, were taken over by the new court. The jurisdiction was formed from parts of the district courts of Oxie and Skytts' hundred's tithing, Torna and Bara judicial district's tithing and the jurisdiction of Malmö city court. From 1971, the areas of Malmö municipality, Lomma Municipality and Burlöv Municipality were included. In addition, Bara municipality until it was dissolved at the turn of the year 1976/1977, when the area was transferred to Svedala Municipality and Trelleborg's judicial district.

On December 12, 2005, Lomma municipality was removed from the jurisdiction, which was then transferred to Lund jurisdiction. At the same time, the jurisdiction was extended to include Vellinge Municipality, which was transferred from the then dissolved Trelleborgs judicial district.

Until April 30, 2011, Malmö District Court was the property court for Skåne County. The Property Court ceased operations on May 1, 2011, when it was transferred to the Land and Environment Court at Växjö District Court.

== Activities ==
Malmö District Court has around 170 employees, divided into four divisions, a service office, administration and security staff. Three departments deal with criminal and civil cases. In addition to these, there is a special criminal division that deals with more extensive criminal cases. An investigation by the Swedish National Courts Administration in 2012 found that Malmö District Court was one of the six courts in the country that needed increased security checks following an increase in violence, threats and seized weapons on the premises. The court has since introduced permanent access controls similar to those at airports.

The district court also has premises in the legal center built next to the police station on Porslinsgatan in Malmö. This includes the district court's large security room where witnesses and plaintiffs do not have to meet the defendant or his relatives in public areas and where escape attempts are greatly hampered. The Malmö legal center, together with a facility in Stockholm, has the highest level of security in the country.

== The Building ==
Malmö's new court is not only the largest court in the Nordic region, but also one of Sweden's largest and most complex office interiors with a total of 30,000 square metres (320,000 sq ft). The building has 14 floors and some 40 courtrooms with associated public areas, office areas with about 700 workplaces, meeting rooms and dining rooms. It was designed by Henning Larsen Architects. White Arkitekter completed the interior project. Completed in 2023.

== Attack ==
On the morning of 3 February 2014, an explosive device was detonated at the entrance to the detention and security rooms of the District Court at the Justice Center. No one was injured and operations continued as usual despite the attack. Material damage was limited to a broken security glass and its frame.

In November 2014, the same entrance was destroyed in a blast attack. The blast also shattered a large number of windows in surrounding buildings.

== Gallery ==
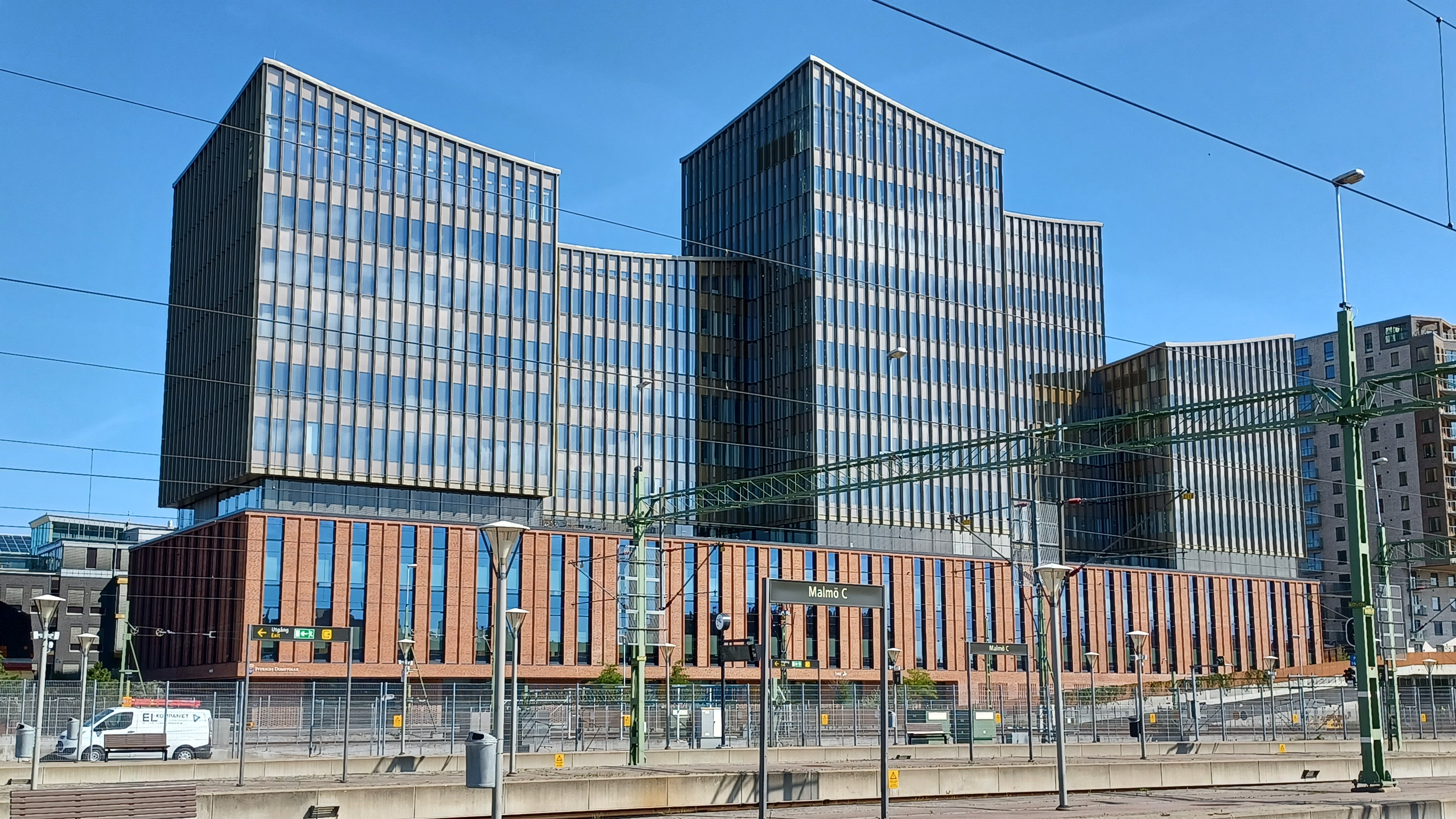
South facade

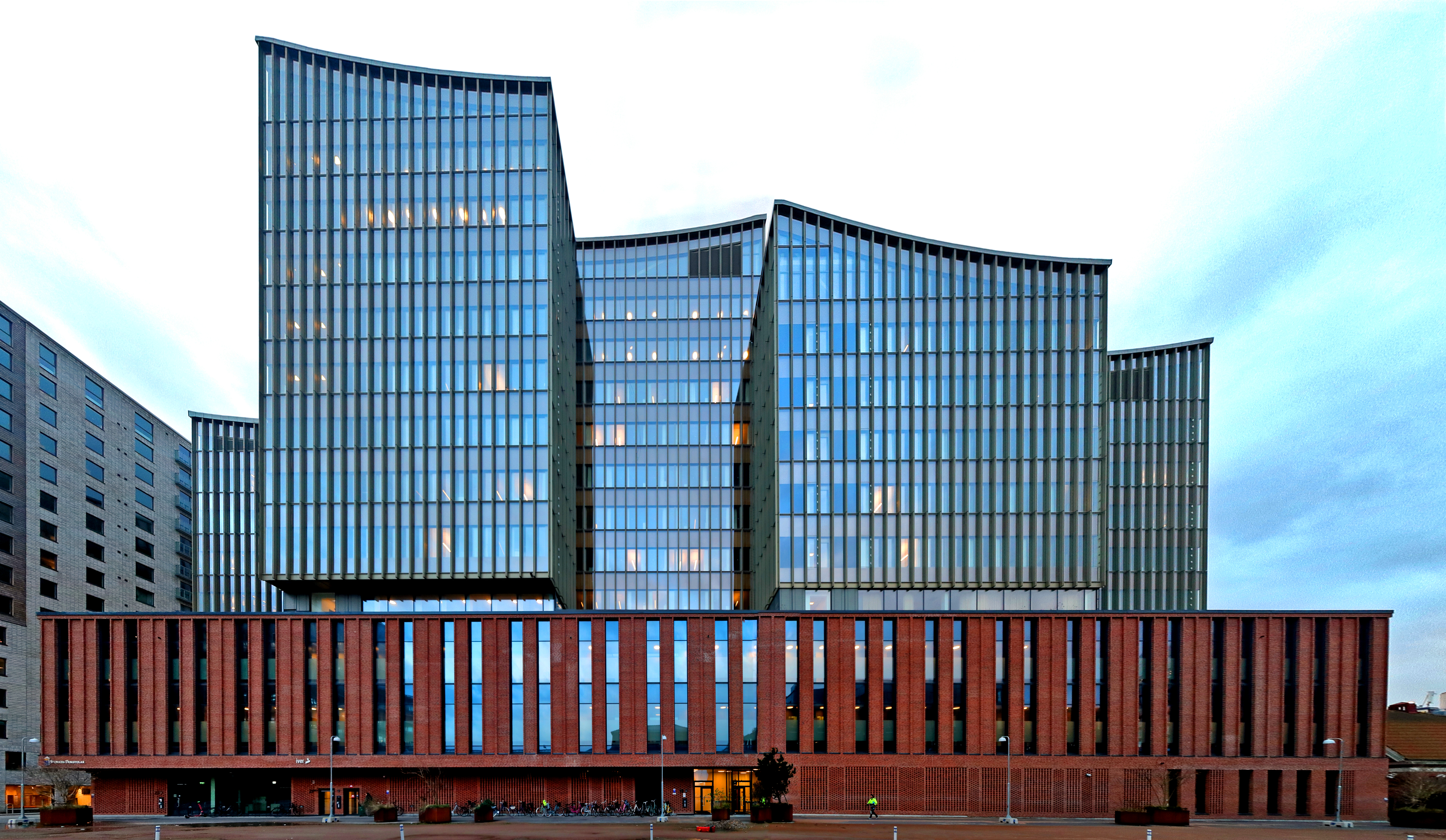
North facade

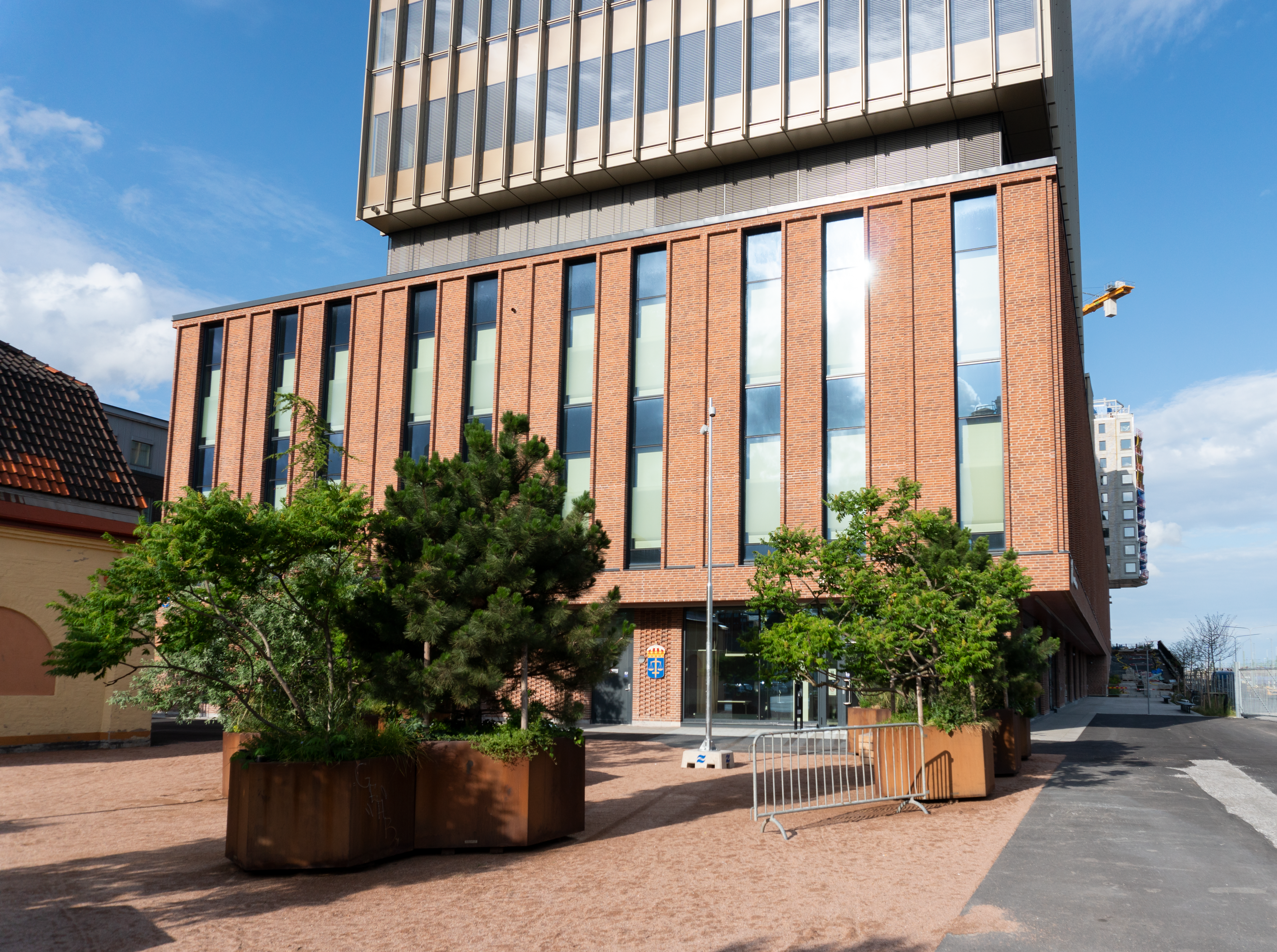
Entrance

== See also ==
- District courts of Sweden
- Scania and Blekinge Court of Appeal
