= Jila Mossaed =

Swedish writer (born 1948)

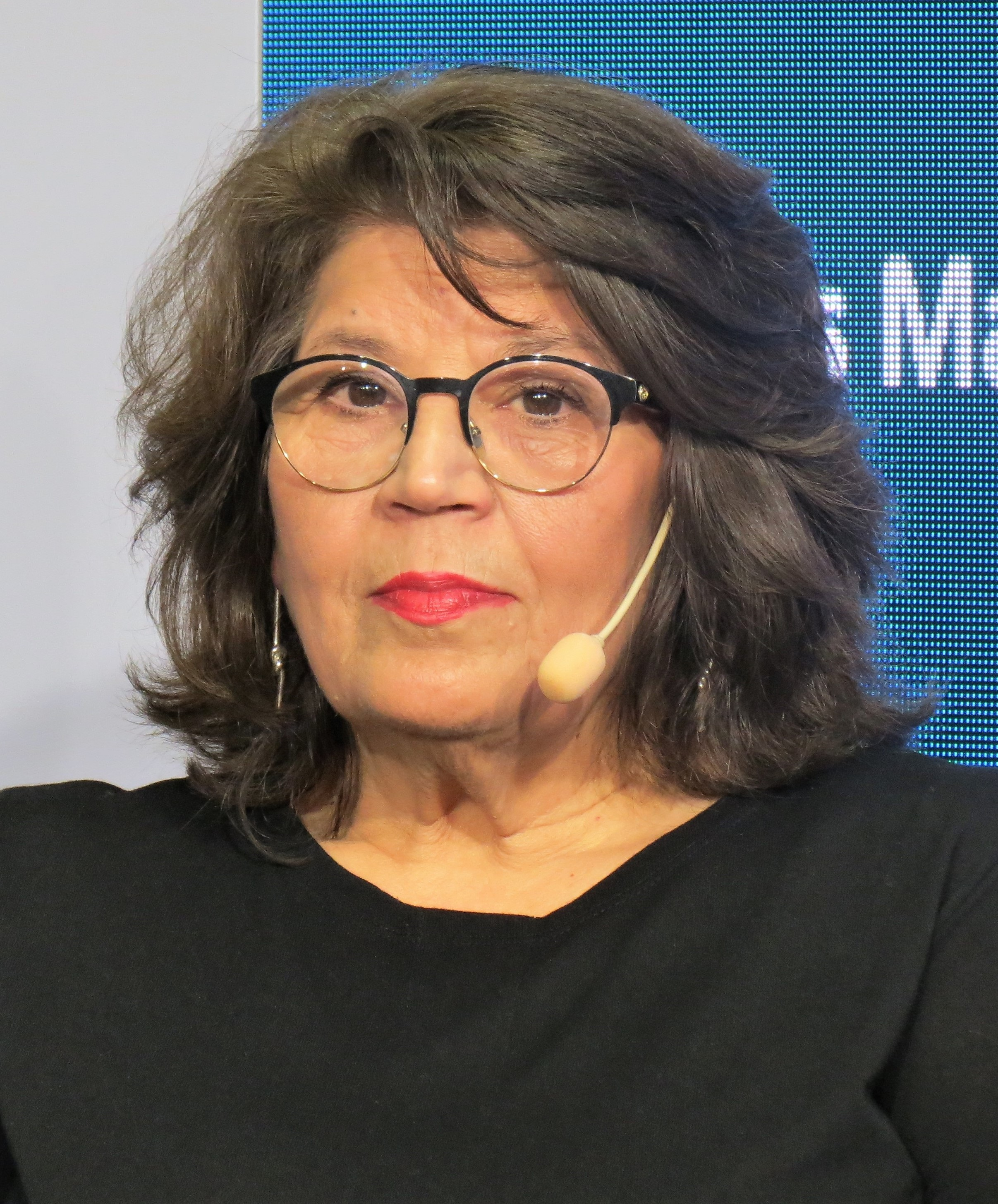
- Born: 4 April 1948 (age 78); Tehran, Iran
- Occupations: writer and poet

Member of the Swedish Academy (Seat No. 15)
- Incumbent
- Assumed office 20 December 2018
- Preceded by: Kerstin Ekman

Jila Mossaed Estakhri (Persian: ژیلا مساعد استخری; born 4 April 1948) is a Swedish writer. Born in Tehran, Iran, she was named a new member of the Swedish Academy on 4 October 2018, and was formally inducted into the Academy on 20 December 2018.

Mossaed has lived in Sweden in exile from Iran since 1986. She resides in Gothenburg, and writes in both Swedish and Persian. On 5 October 2018, Mossaed was named a new member of the Swedish Academy together with Supreme Court justice Eric M. Runesson. She replaced author Kerstin Ekman, who ended her involvement with the Academy in 1989 over its handling of the Rushdie affair (and formally resigned in 2018), on seat 15.

Mossaed's poetry has been translated into Dutch, English, French, and Greek. In 2020, Mossaed received the Prix Vénus Khoury-Ghata and in 2022 she received the Prix Max-Jacob for Le huitième pays (Det åttonde landet), translated by Françoise Sule.

Cultural offices
Preceded by Kerstin Ekman	Swedish Academy, Seat No.15; 2018–	Succeeded by incumbent
