= Hundred (county division) =

Geographical administrative division

A hundred is an administrative division that is geographically part of a larger region. It was formerly used in England, Wales, some parts of the United States, Denmark, Sweden, Finland, Norway, and in Cumberland County in the British Colony of New South Wales. It is still used in other places, including in Australia (in South Australia and the Northern Territory). Other terms for the hundred in English and other languages include wapentake, herred (Danish and Bokmål Norwegian), herad (Nynorsk Norwegian), härad or hundare (Swedish), Harde (German), hiird (North Frisian), kihlakunta (Finnish), kihelkond (Estonian), and cantref (Welsh). In Ireland, a similar subdivision of counties is referred to as a barony, and a hundred is a subdivision of a particularly large townland (most townlands are not divided into hundreds).

== Etymology ==
The origin of the division of counties into hundreds is described by the Oxford English Dictionary as "exceedingly obscure". It may once have referred to an area of 100 hides; in early Anglo-Saxon England a hide was the amount of land farmed by and required to support a peasant family, but by the 11th century in many areas it supported four families. Alternatively the hundred may have been an area originally settled by one "hundred" men at arms, or the area liable to provide one "hundred" men under arms. In this early medieval use, the number term "hundred" can be unclear, meaning the "short" hundred (100) or in some contexts the long hundred of 120.

There was an equivalent traditional Germanic system. In Old High German a huntari is a division of a gau, but the Oxford English Dictionary states that the link between the two is not established.

== England ==
Hundred
- Also known as: Wapentake; Ward
- Category: County subdivision
- Location: England
- Found in: Shires
- Possible status: Royal manor
- Government: Hundred court
- Subdivisions: Divisions; Half hundreds; Tithings; Parishes

=== Administrative functions ===
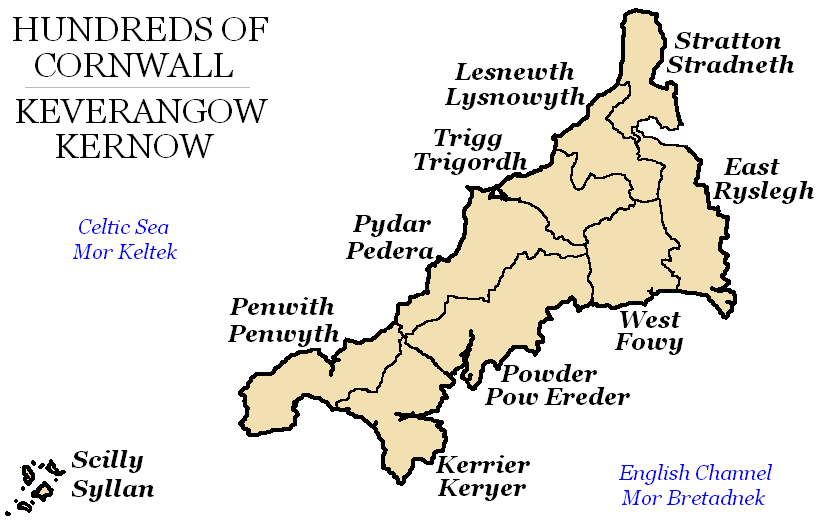
Hundreds of Cornwall in the early 19th century

From the 11th century in England – and to a lesser extent from the 16th century in Wales – to the middle of the 19th century, the annual assemblies had varying degrees of power at a local level in the feudal system. Of chief importance was their more regular use for taxation, and six centuries of taxation returns for the divisions survive to this day.

Groupings of divisions, small shires, were used to define parliamentary constituencies from 1832 to 1885. On the redistribution of seats in 1885 a different county subdivision, the petty sessional division, was used. Hundreds were also used to administer the first five national censuses from 1801 to 1841.

The system of county divisions was not as stable as the system of counties being established at the time, and lists frequently differ on how many hundreds a county had. In many parts of the country, the Domesday Book of 1086 contained a radically different set of divisions from that which later became established. The numbers of divisions in each county varied widely. For example Leicestershire had six (up from four at Domesday), whereas Devon, nearly three times the size, had 32.

By the end of the 19th century, several single-purpose subdivisions of counties, such as poor law unions, sanitary districts, and highway districts, had sprung up, which, together with the introduction of urban districts and rural districts in 1894, mostly replaced the role of the parishes, and to a lesser extent the less extensive role of hundreds. The division names gave their name to multiple modern local government districts.

=== Description ===
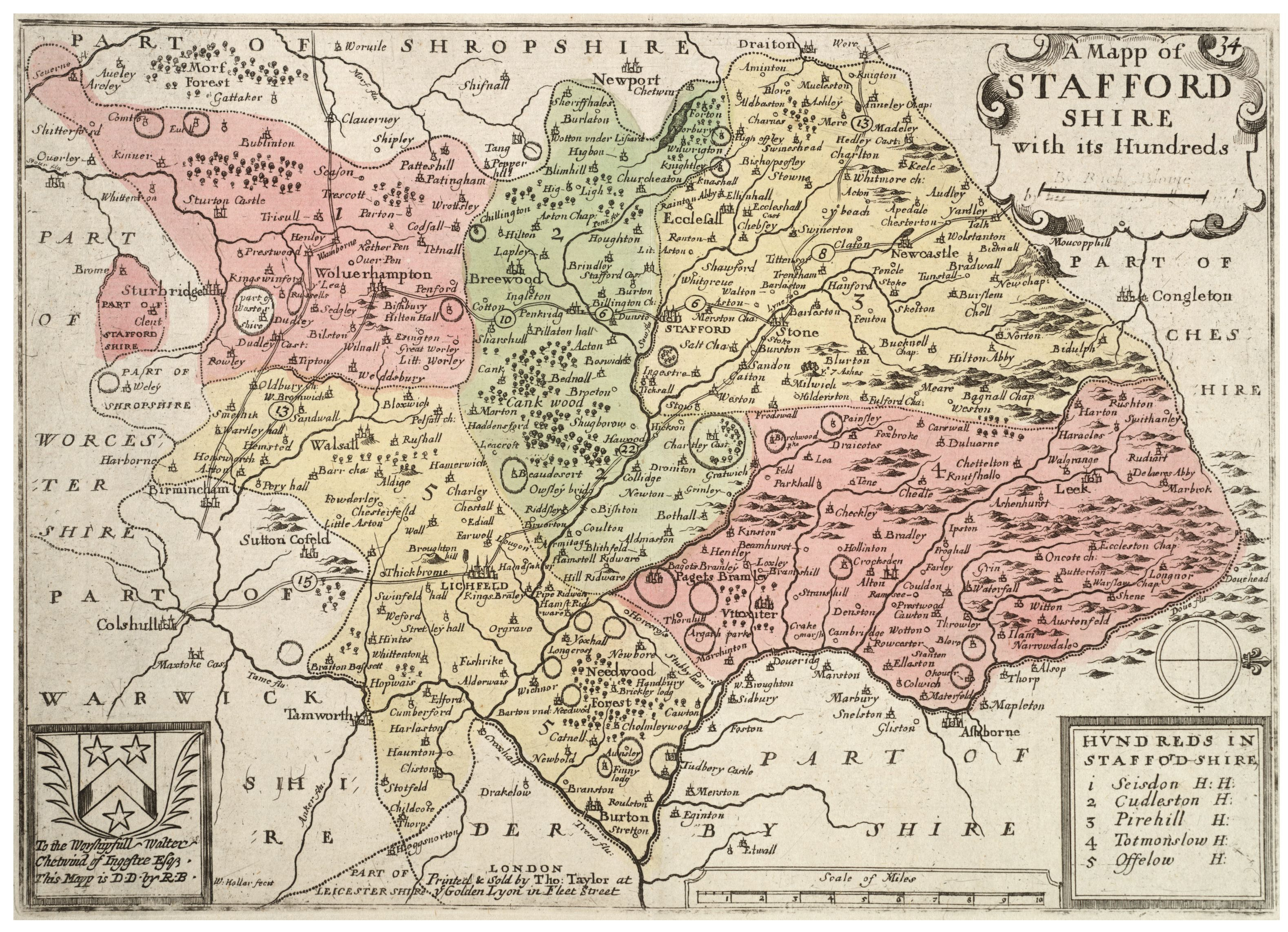
Map of the Hundreds of Staffordshire, c. 1650. North is to the right.

In southern and western England, a hundred was the division of a shire for military and judicial purposes under the common law, which could have varying extent of common feudal ownership, from complete suzerainty to minor royal or ecclesiastical prerogatives and rights of ownership. Until the introduction of districts by the Local Government Act 1894, hundreds were the only widely used assessment unit intermediate in size between the parish, with its various administrative functions, and the county, with its formal ceremonial functions.

The term "hundred" is first recorded in the 10th-century laws of King Edmund I as a measure of land and the area served by a hundred court. In the Midlands, they often covered an area of about 100 hides, but this did not apply in the south; this may suggest that it was an ancient West Saxon measure that was applied rigidly when Mercia became part of the newly established English kingdom in the 10th century. The Hundred Ordinance, which dates to the middle of the 10th century, provides that the court was to meet monthly, and thieves were to be pursued by all the leading men of the district.

During Norman times, the hundred would pay geld based on the number of hides. To assess how much everyone had to pay, a clerk and a knight were sent by the king to each county; they sat with the shire-reeve (or sheriff) of the county and a select group of local knights. There would be two knights from each hundred. After it was determined what geld had to be paid, the bailiff and knights of the hundred were responsible for getting the money to the sheriff and the sheriff for getting it to the Exchequer.

Above the hundred was the shire, under the control of a sheriff. Hundred boundaries were independent of both parish and county boundaries, although often aligned, meaning that a hundred could be split between counties, or a parish could be split between hundreds. Exceptionally, in the counties of Kent and Sussex, there was a subdivision intermediate in size between the hundred and the shire: several hundreds were grouped together to form lathes in Kent and rapes in Sussex. At the time of the Norman Conquest, Kent was divided into seven lathes and Sussex into four rapes.

==== Hundred courts ====
Over time, the principal functions of the hundred became the administration of law and the keeping of the peace. By the 12th century, the hundred court was held twelve times a year. This was later increased to fortnightly, although an ordinance of 1234 reduced the frequency to once every three weeks. In some hundreds, courts were held at a fixed place; while in others, courts moved with each sitting to a different location. The main duty of the hundred court was the maintenance of the frankpledge system. The court was formed of twelve freeholders, or freemen. According to a 13th-century statute, freeholders did not have to attend their lord's manorial courts, thus any suits involving them would be heard in a hundred court.

For especially serious crimes, the hundred was under the jurisdiction of the Crown; the chief magistrate was a sheriff, and his circuit was called the sheriff's tourn. However, many hundreds came into private hands, with the lordship of the hundred being attached to the principal manor of the area and becoming hereditary. Historian Helen Cam estimates that even before the Conquest, over 130 hundreds were in private hands; while an inquest of 1316 found that by that date 388 of 628 named hundreds were held by the king's subjects. Where a hundred was under a lord, a steward – acting as a judge and the chief official of the lord of the manor – was appointed in place of a sheriff.

The importance of the hundred courts declined from the 17th century, and most of their powers were extinguished with the establishment of county courts in 1867. The remaining duty of the inhabitants of a hundred to make good damages caused by riot was ended by the Riot (Damages) Act 1886, when the cost was transferred to the county police rate. The jurisdiction of hundred courts was curtailed by the Administration of Justice Act 1977.

==== Chiltern Hundreds ====
By law in the United Kingdom, a member of parliament (MP) cannot resign their seat, but will be disqualified from sitting if appointed to an "office of profit under the Crown". A Crown Steward of the Chiltern Hundreds was appointed to maintain law and order in the area, but these duties ceased to be performed in the 16th century, and the holder ceased to gain any benefits during the 17th century. The position remains in use as a procedural device, with MPs wishing to resign appointed as Crown Stewards.

=== Wapentake ===
A wapentake, an Old Norse–derived term common in Northern England, (Note: Old English wǣpen(ge)tæc, from Old Norse] vápnatak, from vápn 'weapon' + taka 'take', perhaps with reference to voting in an assembly (known as a thing) by weapons taken out at a meeting point.) was the equivalent of the Anglo-Saxon hundred in the northern Danelaw. In the Domesday Book the term is used instead of hundreds in Yorkshire, the Five Boroughs of Derby, Leicester, Lincoln, Nottingham and Stamford, and also sometimes in Northamptonshire. The laws in wapentakes were similar to those in hundreds with minor variations.

According to the 1st-century historian Tacitus, in Scandinavia the wapentake referred to a vote passed at an assembly by the brandishing of weapons. In some counties, such as Leicestershire, the wapentakes recorded at the time of Domesday Book later evolved into hundreds. In others, such as Lincolnshire, the term remained in use. Although no longer part of local government, there is some correspondence between the rural deanery and the former wapentake or hundred; especially in the East Midlands, the Buckingham Archdeaconry and the York Diocese.

== Wales ==
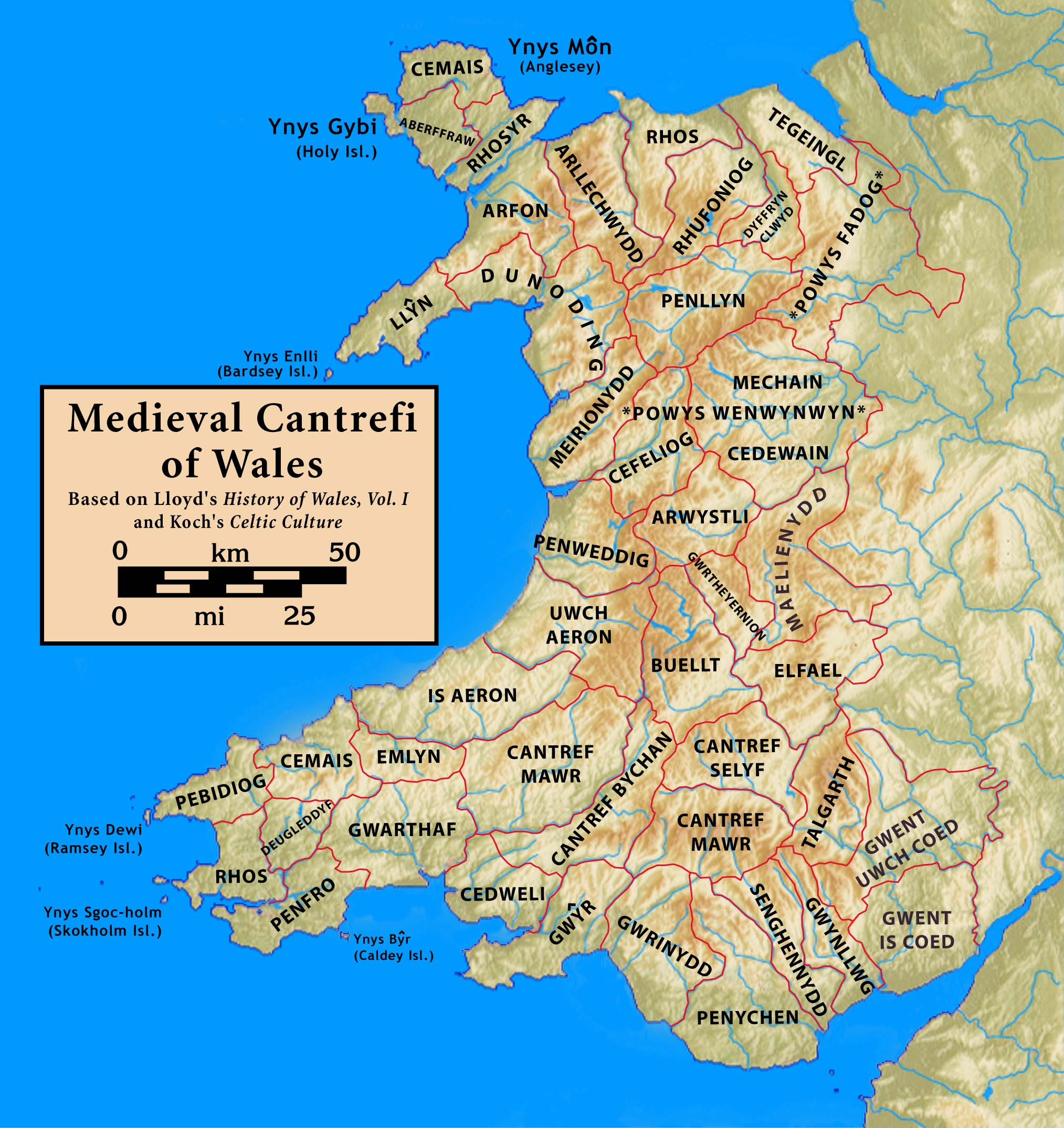
Medieval cantrefi of Wales

In Wales an ancient Celtic system of division called cantrefi (a hundred farmsteads; singular cantref) had existed for centuries and was of particular importance in the administration of the Welsh law. The antiquity of the cantrefi is demonstrated by the fact that they often mark the boundary between dialects. Some were originally kingdoms in their own right; others may have been artificial units created later. With the coming of Christianity, the llan (similar to the parish) based Celtic churches often took the borders of the older cantrefi, and the same happened when Norman 'hundreds' were enforced on the people of Wales.

Each cantref had its own court, which was an assembly of the uchelwyr, the main landowners of the cantref. This would be presided over by the king if he happened to be present, or if he was not present, by his representative. Apart from the judges there would be a clerk, an usher and sometimes two professional pleaders. The cantref court dealt with crimes, the determination of boundaries, and inheritance.

== Nordic countries ==
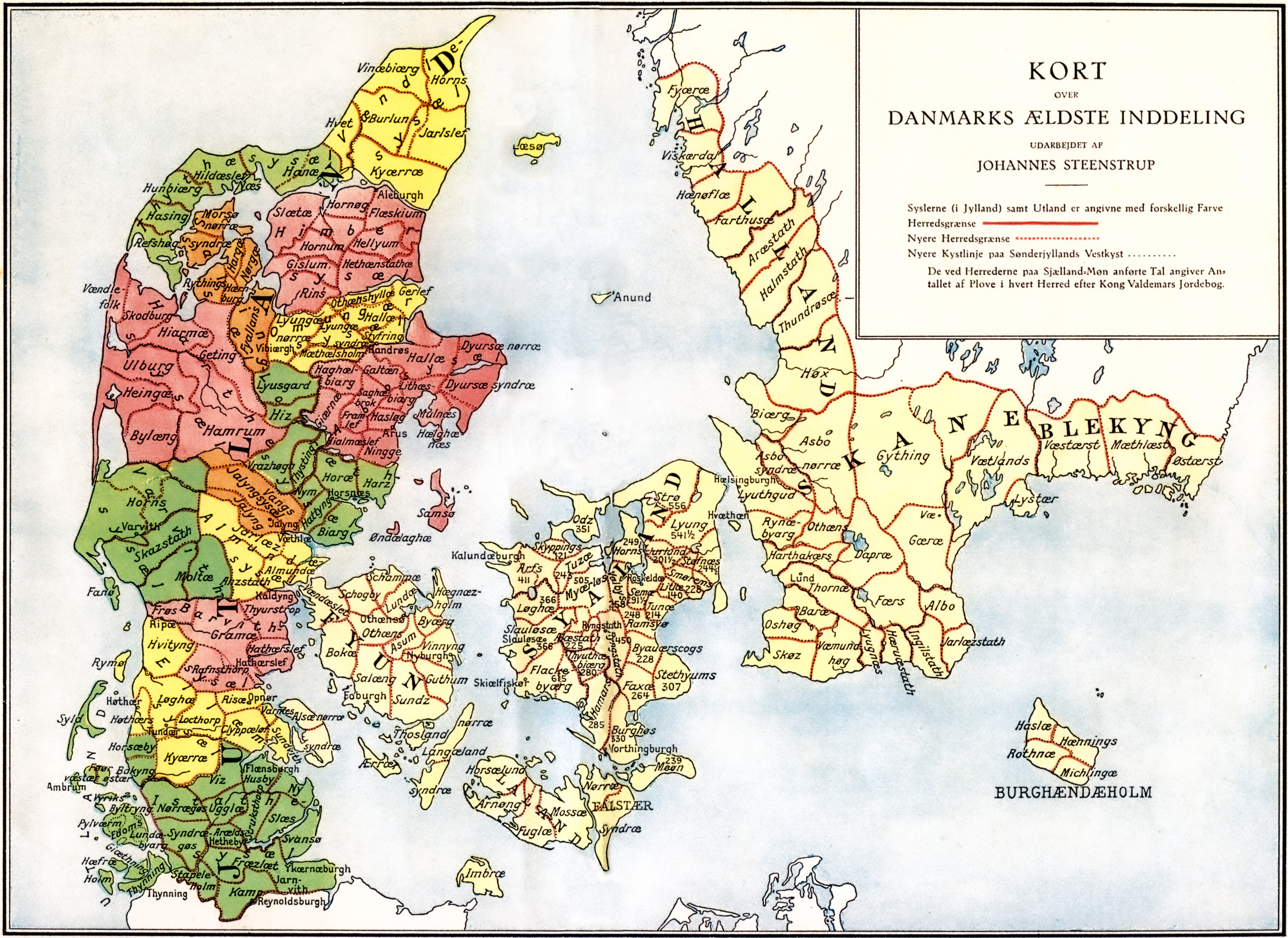
Map of medieval Denmark, showing herreder and sysler. The entire country was divided into herreder, shown outlined in red. Coloured areas show Jutland's syssel divisions. Zealand's four ecclesiastic sysler are not included.

The term hundare (hundred) was used in Svealand and present-day Finland. The name is assumed to mean an area that should organise 100 men to crew four rowed war boats, which each had 12 pairs of oars and a commander. Eventually, that division was superseded by introducing the härad or Herred, which was the term in the rest of the Nordic countries. This word was derived from either Proto-Norse *harja-raiðō (warband) or Proto-Germanic *harja-raiða (war equipment, cf. wapentake). This system was similar to the skipreide, a part of the coast where the inhabitants were responsible for equipping and manning a war ship.

Hundreds were not organized in Norrland, the northern sparsely populated part of Sweden. In Sweden, a countryside härad was typically divided into a few socken units (parish), where the ecclesiastical and worldly administrative units often coincided. This began losing its basic significance through the Swedish municipal reform of 1862. A härad was originally a subdivision of a landskap (province), but since the government reform of 1634, län ("county") took over all administrative roles of the province. A härad functioned also as electoral district for one peasant representative during the Riksdag of the Estates (Swedish parliament 1436–1866). The häradsrätt (assize court) was the court of first instance in the countryside, abolished in 1971 and superseded by tingsrätt (modern district courts).

Today, the hundreds serve no administrative role in Sweden, although some judicial district courts still bear the name (e.g. Attunda tingsrätt) and the hundreds are occasionally used in expressions, e.g. Sjuhäradsbygden (district of seven hundreds).

It is not entirely clear when hundreds were organised in the western part of Finland. The name of the province of Satakunta, roughly meaning hundred (sata meaning "one hundred" in Finnish), hints at influences from the times before the Northern Crusades, Christianization, and incorporation into Sweden.

As kihlakunta, hundreds remained the fundamental administrative division for the state authorities until 2009. Each was subordinated to a lääni (province/county) and had its own police department, district court and prosecutors. Typically, cities would comprise an urban kihlakunta by themselves, but several rural municipalities would belong to a rural kihlakunta. In a rural hundred the lensmann (chief of local state authorities) was called nimismies ("appointed man"), or archaically vallesmanni (from Swedish). In the Swedish era (up to 1809), his main responsibilities were maintenance of stagecoach stations and coaching inns, supplying traveling government personnel with food and lodging, transport of criminal prisoners, police responsibilities, arranging district court proceedings (tingsrätt), collection of taxes, and sometimes arranging hunts to cull the wolf and bear population. Following the abolition of the provinces as an administrative unit in 2009, the territory for each authority could be demarcated separately, i.e. police districts need not equal court districts in number. The title "härad" survives in the honorary title of herastuomari (Finnish) or häradsdomare (Swedish), which can be given to lay judges after 8–10 years of service.

The term herred or herad was used in Norway between 1863 and 1992 for rural municipalities, besides the term kommune (heradskommune). Today, only three municipalities in western Norway call themselves herad: Ulvik herad Kvam herad, and Voss herad. Some Norwegian places have the word herad in their name, of historical reasons such as Krødsherad and Heradsbygd in Norway.

== United States ==
Counties in Delaware, Maryland, New Jersey and Pennsylvania were divided into hundreds in the 17th century, following the English practice familiar to the colonists. They survive in Delaware and were used as tax reporting and voting districts until the 1960s but now serve no administrative role: their only official legal use is in real estate title descriptions. Following American independence, the term "hundred" fell out of favor and was replaced by "election district". However, the names of the old hundreds continue to show up in deeds for another 50 years.

The hundred was used as a division of the county in Maryland. Carroll County was formed in 1836 by taking hundreds from Baltimore County and from Frederick County. Somerset County, which was established in 1666, was initially divided into six hundreds: Mattapony, Pocomoke, Boquetenorton, Wicomico, and Baltimore Hundreds; later subdivisions of the hundreds added five more: Pitts Creek, Acquango, Queponco, Buckingham, and Worcester Hundreds. The original borders of Talbot County (founded at some point prior to 12 February 1661) contained nine hundreds: Treadhaven Hundred, Bolenbroke Hundred, Mill Hundred, Tuckahoe Hundred, Worrell Hundred, Bay Hundred, Island Hundred, Lower Kent Island Hundred, Chester Hundred. In 1669 Chester Hundred was given to Kent County. In 1707 Queen Anne's County was created from the northern parts of Talbot County, reducing the latter to seven hundreds (Lower Kent Island Hundred becoming a part of the former). Of these, only Bay Hundred legally remains in existence, as District 5 in Talbot County. The geographic region, which includes several unincorporated communities and part of present-day Saint Michaels, continues to be known by the name Bay Hundred, with state and local governments using the name in ways ranging from water trail guides to community pools, while local newspapers regularly use the name in reporting news.

Some plantations in Colonial Virginia used the term hundred in their names, such as Martin's Hundred, Flowerdew Hundred, and West and Shirley Hundred. Bermuda Hundred was the first incorporated town in Virginia; it was founded by Sir Thomas Dale in 1613, six years after Jamestown. While debating what became the Land Ordinance of 1785, Thomas Jefferson's committee wanted to divide the public lands in the west into "hundreds of ten geographical miles square, each mile containing 6086 and 4-10ths of a foot". The legislation instead introduced the six-mile square township of the Public Land Survey System.

== Australia ==
In South Australia, land titles record in which hundred a parcel of land is located. Similar to the notion of the South Australian counties listed on the system of titles, hundreds are not generally used when referring to a district and are little known by the general population, except when transferring land title. When the land in the region of the present Darwin, in the Northern Territory, was first surveyed, the territory was administered by South Australia, and the surveyed land was divided up into hundreds. The Cumberland County (Sydney) was also allocated hundreds in the nineteenth century, although these were later repealed. A hundred is traditionally one hundred square miles or 64,000 acres (26,000 ha), although this is often not exact as boundaries often follow local topography.

== See also ==
- Attundaland
- Feudal measurement
- Fjärdhundraland
- Henry de Bracton
- Hundred Rolls
- Leidang
- Moot mound, the meeting place of an Anglo-Saxon hundred
- Roslagen
- Tiundaland
