= Sten Rudholm =

Swedish jurist

His Excellency Sten Rudholm RoKKMO
- Born: Sten John Gustaf Rudholm; 27 April 1918; Karlstad, Sweden
- Died: 29 September 2008 (aged 90); Norrtälje, Sweden
- Occupation: lawyer
- Employers: Chancellor of Justice; Swedish Language Council
- Awards: Royal Order of the Seraphim

Member of the Swedish Academy (Seat No. 1)
- In office 20 December 1977 – 29 November 2008
- Preceded by: Sture Petrén
- Succeeded by: Lotta Lotass

Sten John Gustaf Rudholm RoKKMO (27 April 1918 – 29 November 2008) was a Swedish lawyer, member of the Swedish Academy (Chair No.1), former Chancellor of Justice, Chief Justice of Appeal and Marshal of the Realm. Rudholm was prior to his death the only living Swedish non-royal to have been made Knight of the Royal Order of the Seraphim – the foremost order of Sweden.

== Biography ==
=== Early life ===
Sten Rudholm was born in 1918 at Karlstad. He graduated in law in 1942 in Stockholm. His career in the judiciary was largely associated with the Svea Court of Appeal in Stockholm. After training as a judicial registrar and qualifying service as a public prosecutor, he was appointed public prosecutor in 1945 – a natural career to judgeship.

=== Court service ===
Having co-authored Handbok för nämndemän (Handbook for jurors) in 1949, Rudholm became an appeal court judge in 1954 and a justice of appeal in 1961. He crowned his judicial career in 1967 with the position of President of the Svea Court of Appeal – by tradition and protocol the highest ranking position of the Swedish judiciary. Serving as President of the Court of Appeals, Rudholm was last non-royal Swedish citizen to be awarded the Order of the Seraphim.

=== Legal service ===
Rudholm's career as a judge came to overlap with duties as a public official in various appointments. In 1955–1961, Rudholm was the head of the legal section at the Ministry of Justice, drafting and scrutinising new bills for presentation to the Riksdag. Meanwhile, in 1959–1963, he served as a judicial expert for the Constitutional Commission. The commission had been set up in 1954 and was chaired by former prime minister Rickard Sandler, to conduct an overall review of the Swedish constitution. After nine years, in 1963, the Commission submitted its first proposal for a new constitution. In an initiated article, Rudholm and the constitutional lawyer Nils Stjernquist, describe the Commission's political and judicial complications. The article gives a picture of Sten Rudholm as a skilled writer, which can be divided into two: the writer of legal text, with a considerable volume of diverse and more or less anonymous texts in e.g. penal law and public law, and the free writer, which emerges above all during his years as journal editor.

After his time as head of the legal section at the Department of Justice and in parallel with his new appointment as Chancellor of Justice (Justitiekansler), Rudholm became the Editor of the Swedish Law Journal (Svensk Juristtidning). Rudholm kept up the editorial work during the whole of his period as Chancellor of Justice in 1962–1967, and until he became President of Svea Court of Appeal, a position he then held for almost seventeen years, until 1983. On reaching retirement age, Rudholm was honoured with the prestigious office of Marshal of the Realm, the principal administrator of the Swedish Royal Court. He gave up the office of Marshal of the Realm in 1986.

=== Swedish Academy ===
Rudholm was still appeal court president when elected to the Swedish Academy on 10 February 1977 and admitted on 20 December 1977. He succeeded late justice Sture Petrén to Chair No.1 - a seat that during the twentieth century by custom had come to be occupied by lawyers. Rudholm has been on the boards of a number of companies, associations and institutions, some of which lie within the Swedish Academy’s sphere of interest. He was e.g. chairman of the Swedish General Art Association in 1974–1983 and a member of the Swedish Language Council in 1977–1986. His quarter of a century in the Academy offers many examples of his clear style as a free writer, predominantly in public speaking, while his inaugural address on his predecessor justice Sture Petrén witnesses to his care for the language.

== Bibliography ==
- Handbok för nämndemän : rättegången i häradsrätt och rådhusrätt (1949)
- Sture Petrén : inträdestal i Svenska akademien (1977)

Cultural offices
Preceded by Sture Petrén	Swedish Academy, Seat No.1; 1977–2008	Succeeded by Lotta Lotass
