= Ulf Bernitz =

Swedish legal scholar, professor of European Integration Law at Stockholm University

Ulf Bernhard Bernitz (28 February 1936 – 23 July 2022) was a Swedish legal scholar. He was professor of European Integration Law at Stockholm University.

Ulf Bernitz was born in Stockholm on 28 February 1936. He earned his LL.M. degree (jur.kand.) from Stockholm University College in 1959 and, after serving as a court clerk from 1960 to 1962, was appointed associate judge (fiskal) at the Svea Court of Appeal in 1963. That same year, he obtained a Master of Comparative Jurisprudence degree in New York. He earned his Licentiate of Laws (jur.lic.) at Stockholm University in 1966 and became a Doctor of Laws (LL.D.) in 1969. In the same year, he was appointed docent in private law and assistant professor at Stockholm University. Bernitz became professor of private law in 1975, professor of private law with a special focus on consumer and market law in 1980, and professor of European Integration Law in 1993, at Stockholm University. In 2000, he was appointed visiting professor at King's College London. He died 23 July 2022 in Stockholm.

He was elected a foreign member of the Finnish Academy of Science and Letters in 1988 and a member of the Norwegian Academy of Science and Letters in 1995.
