= Göta Court of Appeal =

Swedish court of appeal

- Göta hovrätt
- Coat of arms.
- Interactive map of Göta Court of Appeal
- 57.781347°N 14.1758974°E
- Established: 1634
- Location: Jönköping
- Coordinates: 57.781347°N 14.1758974°E
- Appeals to: Supreme Court of Sweden
- Website: www.gotahovratt.se

The Göta Court of Appeal (Swedish: Göta hovrätt), located in Jönköping, is one of the six appellate courts in the Swedish legal system.

The court was established in 1634 during the regency of Queen Christina. It is the second oldest of the Swedish courts of appeal, after the Svea Court of Appeal (established in 1614). In the beginning, the jurisdiction was Götaland, which in those days also included Värmland. After the second treaty of Brömsebro (1645) and the treaty of Roskilde (1658), the provinces Blekinge, Bohuslän, Halland, and Scania were added. In order to relieve the workload for the Göta court, the Scania and Blekinge Court of Appeal was established in 1820 and the Court of Appeal for Western Sweden in 1948. In 1992, Örebro County was transferred to the jurisdiction of the Göta court.

The building for the Göta court in Jönköping was put into use in 1650 and is the building that has been used the longest time for judiciary purposes in Sweden.

== See also ==
- Courts of appeal in Sweden
- Bodil Lindqvist v Åklagarkammaren i Jönköping
