= Courts of appeal in Sweden =

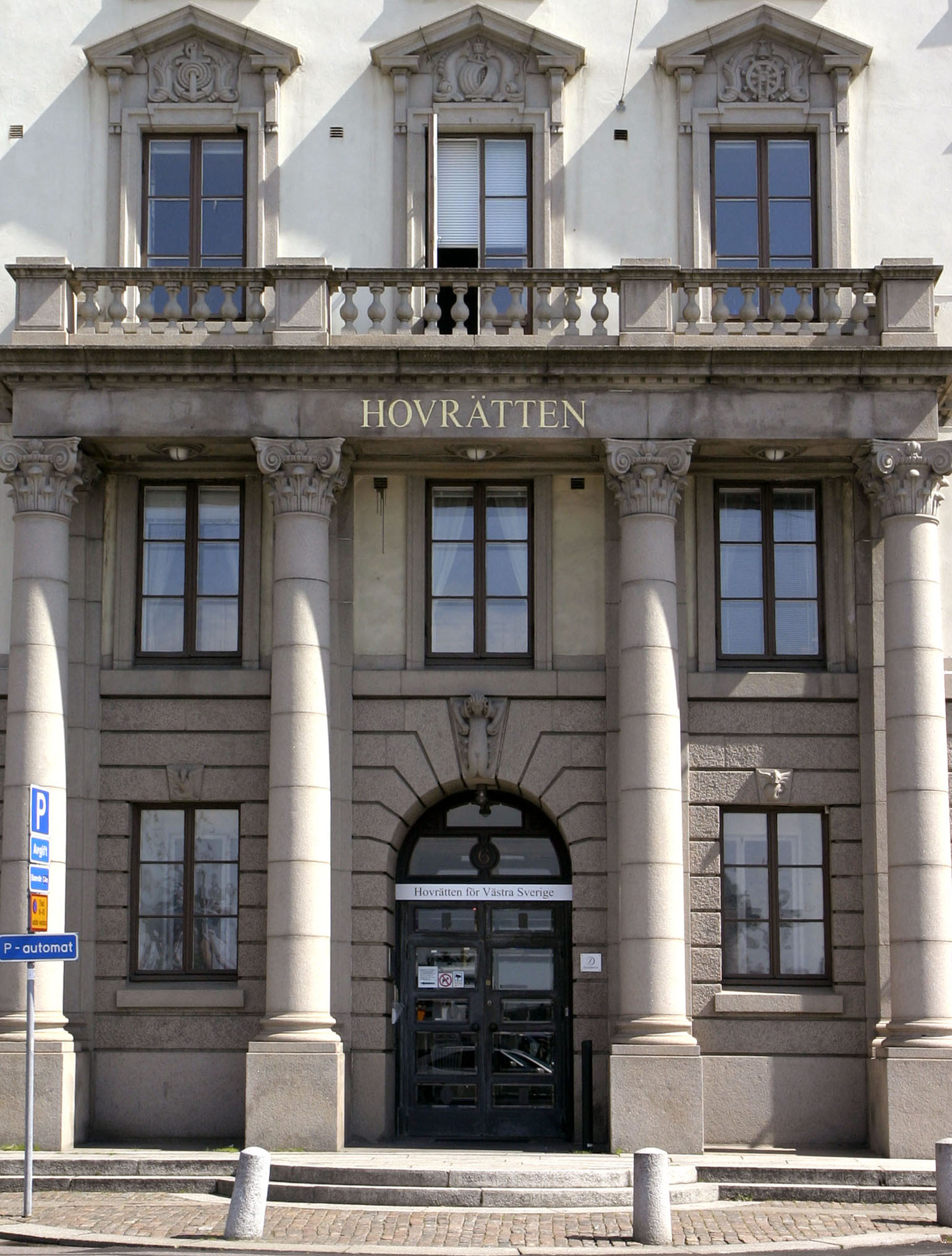
The Court of Appeal for Western Sweden (Hovrätten för Västra Sverige) in Gothenburg.

The courts of appeal in Sweden (Swedish: hovrätt) are the second instance on issues relating to criminal cases, contentious cases and other judicial issues that have already been dealt with by a district court. The next and final instance is the Supreme Court (Swedish: Högsta domstolen). The appellate court may in some circumstances require a leave to appeal, meaning they will only proceed with a case if there is reason to believe they might arrive at a conclusion different from that of the district court or if it is deemed important to establish a precedent.

== Organization ==

The courts of appeal have jurisdiction in appeals from the district courts. The territorial jurisdiction (Swedish: domkrets), dividing Sweden into nine court districts, is based on the geographic boundaries of several district courts, as prescribed by the government. The courts of appeal are:

Name	Founded	Arms	Seat
Svea Court of Appeal	1614		Stockholm
Göta Court of Appeal	1634		Jönköping
Scania and Blekinge Court of Appeal	1821		Malmö
Court of Appeal for Western Sweden	1948		Gothenburg
Court of Appeal for Southern Norrland	1948		Sundsvall
Court of Appeal for Northern Norrland	1936		Umeå

The largest is Svea Court of Appeal, covering fifteen judicial districts. In the courts of appeal, a judge other than the president of a court or a division of a court is titled Judge of Appeal (Swedish: hovrättsråd). A judge who presides over a division is titled Senior Judge of Appeal (Swedish: hovrättslagman), and the head official of the appellate court is titled President, Court of Appeal (Swedish: hovrättspresident).

Approximately 650 people work for the courts of appeal in Sweden. Each court of appeal is divided into a number of departments, headed by a Senior Judge of Appeal or the President. There are also more than 600 lay judges (Swedish: nämndeman) linked to the courts of appeal. Lay judges are laymen, not legally qualified representatives of the people, appointed by the county councils, serving four years at a time. The appellate court make use of lay judges in criminal cases only.

== History ==
The courts of appeal in Sweden were the highest judicial body until King Gustav III founded the Supreme Court of Sweden in 1789. Today, these courts function mostly as appellate courts. They are the second highest general courts in both Sweden and Finland, and both countries have six of them.

The first hovrätt, Svea Court of Appeal, was founded 1614 in Stockholm. In Finland, then part of Sweden, the court in Turku was founded in 1623 by Gustavus Adolphus, mainly because it was difficult to travel from Finland to Stockholm.

During the imperial era, additional courts of appeal were introduced in order to relieve the original Svea hovrätt. Göta Court of Appeal was the second such court in present day Sweden, established in Jönköping in 1634. It was preceded by the court in Turku (1623) and the court in Tartu (1630).

== Quorum of the court ==
The main rule in civil cases is that the appellate court should consist of three legally qualified judges, but there are some exceptions to this rule. At least four legally qualified judges are required to sit for the adjudication of the case, if the district court consisted of three legally qualified judges. If one of the legally qualified judges is prevented from adjudicating after the commencement of the main hearing, the bench nevertheless constitutes a quorum.

In criminal cases, three legally qualified judges and two lay judges constitute a quorum. If there is no reason to impose a sanction more severe than fines in a criminal case, three legally qualified judges constitute a quorum. If one of the legally qualified judges or one of the lay judges are prevented from adjudicating after the commencement of the main hearing, the bench nevertheless constitutes a quorum.

== Special courts ==
Svea Court of Appeal is, in addition to its regular responsibilities as the appellate court for the districts, also responsible for appeals for some of the special courts, like the rent tribunals. The Land and Environment Court of Appeal (Swedish: Mark- och miljööverdomstolen) and the Patent and Market Court of Appeal (Swedish: Patent- och marknadsöverdomstolen) are also part of the Svea Court of Appeal.

== Appeal ==
A leave to appeal is required for a case to be considered by the highest instance in civil and criminal cases, the Supreme Court. This is granted by the Supreme Court itself, and only done when it is deemed important to establish a precedent for the lower courts.

== List and map of general courts ==
Court of Appeal for Northern Norrland
- Gällivare
- Haparanda
- Luleå
- Lycksele
- Skellefteå
- Umeå
Court of Appeal for Southern Norrland
- Gävle
- Hudiksvall
- Sundsvall
- Ångermanland
- Östersund
Svea Court of Appeal
- Attunda
- Eskilstuna
- Falun
- Gotland
- Mora
- Nacka
- Norrtälje
- Nyköping
- Solna
- Stockholm
- Södertälje
- Södertörn
- Uppsala
- Västmanland
Göta Court of Appeal
- Eksjö
- Jönköping
- Kalmar
- Linköping
- Norrköping
- Skaraborg
- Växjö
- Örebro
Court of Appeal for Western Sweden
- Alingsås
- Borås
- Gothenburg
- Halmstad
- Uddevalla
- Varberg
- Vänersborg
- Värmland
Scania and Blekinge Court of Appeal
- Blekinge
- Helsingborg
- Hässleholm
- Kristianstad
- Lund
- Malmö
- Ystad

thunb

The map shows geographic boundaries of the general courts, i.e. the district courts and its appellate court.

== See also ==
- Judiciary of Sweden
- Crime in Sweden

== Notes ==
1. List of district courts on the official website of the Swedish National Courts Administration and SFS 1982:996.
