= Nicolaus Olai Campanius =

Swedish priest (1593–1624)

- Born: 1593; Gävle, Sweden
- Died: 31 July 1624 (aged 30–31); Stockholm, Sweden
- Education: University of Uppsala; University of Olomouc

Nicolaus Olai Campanius (1593–1624), also known as Nolandus, was a Swedish Catholic convert and Rector of a school in Enköping.

He was born in 1593 in Gävle to a family of a sexton, hence his Latin name. After several years of study at the University of Uppsala he set out on the Grand Tour of Europe, which was financed by three bourgeois of Gävle by 200 Swedish riks-tollars per annum for period of three years. First he entered University of Helmstedt. Later Campanius entered a special papal seminary (Latin: Seminarium Pontificium) called in Latin: Collegium Nordicum at University of Olomouc in 1605. Companius complained that his Jesuit instructors in Olomouc were as eager to procure converts to their religion "as the Devil to pursue the soul". But despite this he really did enjoy his philosophy lectures because of the high standard and of proficiency with which the subject was taught.

After completing study in Olomouc, Campanius entered Jesuit College in Braunsberg, however during one of disputes his friend struck a blow on the mouth of one of the Jesuits and they were forced to flee the town. Campanius came back to study in Olomouc, however he became ill there and spent all his money on medical bills. After leaving Olomouc, he spent some time among exiled Swedes in Poland, where he gained support of King Sigismund III Vasa in years 1616–17. Later he returned to Sweden, managed to hide his Catholic background and secretly reconverted to Protestantism. He even became a rector of a school in Enköping; according to different sources it was either a grammar school, Gymnasium (school) or a college. In 1622 he took his Master of Arts degree in Uppsala and also presided a disputation in Philosophy of Olaus Unonis Gavelius at Uppsala University.

He was charged of being a Catholic during inquisition in 1624. He never admitted that he had been a Roman Catholic during his interrogation, however he admitted that he had had his period of doubts. The first clerical court decided to temporary deprive him of his office until his case had been scrutinized by the judges of the Svea Court of Appeal.

The trial before Svea Court of Appeal took place during the third and last week of July 1624. Campanius was again accused of being a Roman Catholic, seducing his students to become Catholics or even Jesuits by inducing them to complete their education abroad at Jesuit institutions and of collaboration with the arch-enemies of Sweden (i.e. emigrants in Poland under leadership of the former king of Sweden Sigismund III.) Campanius spoke very highly of Jesuit tuition methods. On 31 July 1624 he was sentenced to death and executed. Presumably his head was struck of shoulders and placed on a stake as a warning to the general population, as was the custom in Sweden at the time.
