= Lotta Lotass =

Swedish writer

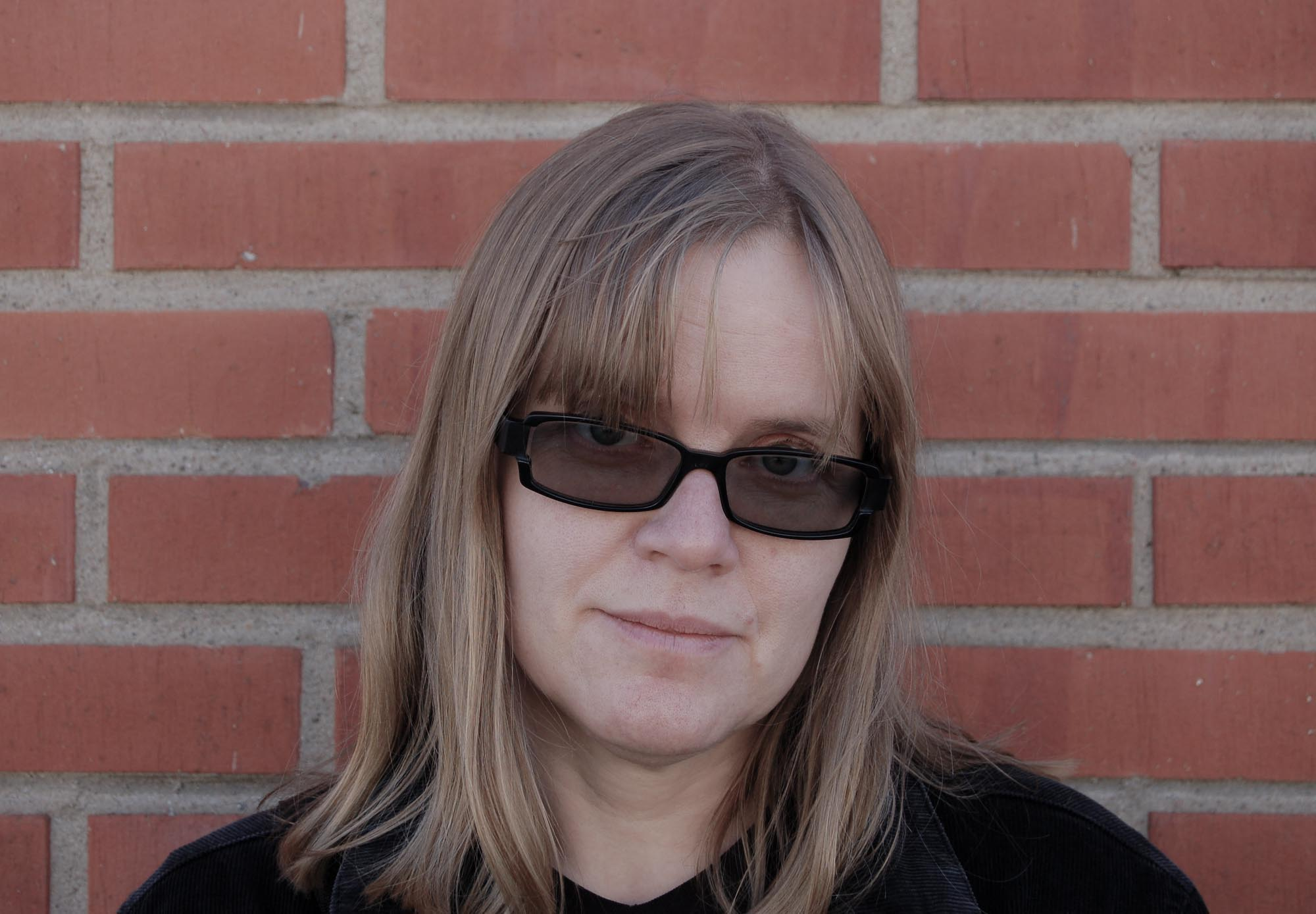
- Lotta Lotass in 2006.
- Born: Britt Inger Liselott Hellberg; 28 February 1964 (age 62); Gagnef, Sweden
- Education: University of Gothenburg
- Writing career
- Language: Swedish
- Notable awards: Aftonbladet Literary Award (2001); Eyvind Johnson Award (2004); Selma Lagerlöf Prize (2014); De Nio's Special prizes (2017)

Member of the Swedish Academy (Seat No. 1)
- In office 20 December 2009 – 7 May 2018
- Preceded by: Sten Rudholm
- Succeeded by: Eric M. Runesson

Britt Inger Liselott "Lotta" Lotass Hagström (born 28 February 1964) is a Swedish writer. She holds a PhD of Comparative literature from the University of Gothenburg, and lives in Gothenburg, Sweden.

Lotass made her literary debut in 2000, and two years later published her doctoral dissertation on Swedish writer Stig Dagerman. On 6 March 2009, Lotass was officially announced to succeed late Sten Rudholm at Seat No. 1 at the Swedish Academy. Lotass took her seat on the 18-member assembly on 20 December 2009.

In an interview in November 2017, Lotass said that she considered herself an inactive member and that she had not had any contact with the Swedish Academy since September 2016. She formally resigned in May 2018.

== Bibliography ==
- Kallkällan (2000)
- Aerodynamiska tal (2001)
- Friheten meddelad. Studier i Stig Dagermans författarskap (2002)
- Band II Från Gabbro till Löväng (2002)
- Tredje flykthastigheten (2004)
- skymning:gryning (2005)
- Samlarna (2005)
- Min röst skall nu komma från en annan plats i rummet (2006)
- Den vita jorden (2007)
- Arkipelag. Hörspel (2007)
- Dalén (2008)
- Den röda himlen (2008)
- Redwood (2008)
- Hemvist (2009)
- Sten Rudholm : inträdestal i Svenska akademien (2009)
- Speleologerna (2009)
- Den svarta solen (2009)
- Kraftverk (2009)
- Klar himmel (2010)
- Sparta (2010)
- Fjärrskrift (2011)
- Nya dikter (2011)
- Konungarnas tillbedjan (2012)
- Everest (2012)
- Mars (2013)
- Varia (2014)
- Örnen (2014)

== Various plays ==
- Samlarna (2005)
- Dalén (2008)
- Klar himmel (2010)
- Everest (2012)

Cultural offices
Preceded by Sten Rudholm	Swedish Academy, Seat No. 1; 2009–2018	Succeeded by Eric M. Runesson
