= Lottery Scratchcards =

Book by Kerstin Ekman

Lottery Scratchards
- First edition
- Author: Kerstin Ekman
- Language: Swedish
- Published: 2003
- Publisher: Albert Bonniers Förlag
- Publication place: Sweden
- Awards: August Prize of 2003

Lottery Scratchcards (Swedish: Skraplotter) is a 2003 novel by Swedish author Kerstin Ekman. It won the August Prize in 2003.
