= Kerstin Ekman =

Swedish novelist (born 1933)

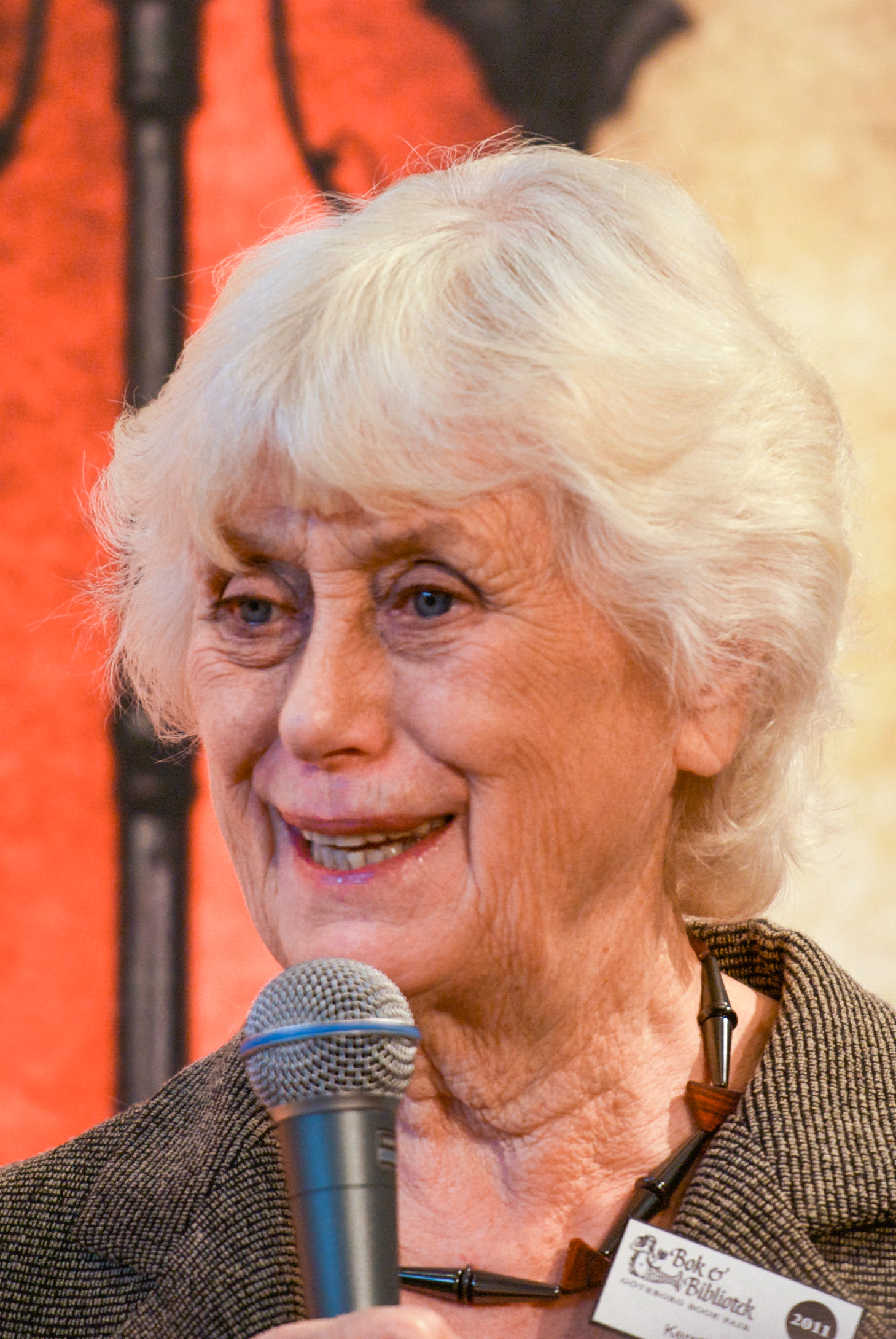
- Kerstin Ekman in 2011
- Born: Kerstin Lillemor Hjorth; 27 August 1933 (age 93); Finspång, Sweden
- Education: Uppsala University (history of literature)
- Spouses: Stig Ekman (1954-1966; divorced); Börje Frelin (1972-)
- Children: Magnus
- Writing career
- Period: 1959–
- Notable works: Blackwater; Kvinnorna och staden trilogy Vargskinnet trilogy
- Notable awards: Best Swedish Crime Novel Award

Member of the Swedish Academy (Seat No. 15)
- In office 20 December 1978 – 7 May 2018
- Preceded by: Harry Martinson
- Succeeded by: Jila Mossaed

Kerstin Lillemor Ekman (née Hjorth; born 27 August 1933) is a Swedish novelist.

== Life and career ==
Kerstin Ekman wrote a string of successful detective novels (among others De tre små mästarna and Dödsklockan) but later went on to psychological and social themes. Among her later works is Mörker och blåbärsris (1972) (set in northern Sweden) and Händelser vid vatten (1993), in which she returned to the form of the detective novel.

Ekman was elected member of the Swedish Academy in 1978, but left the Academy in 1989, together with Lars Gyllensten and Werner Aspenström, due to the debate following death threats posed to Salman Rushdie. In 2018, the Academy granted her resignation, the rules of membership having changed to allow members to resign.

In 1998, she was awarded the Litteris et Artibus medal.

In 2026 she was voted "The best and most significant living Swedish author" by 101 literary critics, scholars and writers in a poll in Svenska Dagbladet.

== Partial bibliography ==
See the article on Swedish Wikipedia for a complete bibliography.

- Blackwater (Händelser vid vatten, 1993), translated by Joan Tate, 1996
- Under the Snow (De tre små mästarna, 1961), translated by Joan Tate, 1997
- The Forest of Hours (Rövarna i Skuleskogen, 1988), translated 1998
- Grand final i skojarbranschen (2011)
- Då var allt levande och lustigt : om Clas Bjerkander : Linnélärjunge, präst och naturforskare i Västergötland (2015)

=== The Women and the Town (Kvinnorna och staden) Tetralogy ===
- Witches' Rings (Häxringarna, 1974), translated by Linda Schenck, 1997
- The Spring (Springkällan, 1976), translated by Linda Schenck, 1999
- Angel House (Änglahuset, 1979), translated by Sarah G. Death, 2002
- A City of Light (En stad av ljus, 1983), translated by Linda Schenck, 2003

=== The Wolfskin (Vargskinnet) Trilogy ===
- God's Mercy (Guds Barmhärtighet, 1999)
- The Last String (Sista rompan, 2002)
- Lottery Scratchcards (Skraplotter, 2003)

Cultural offices
Preceded by Harry Martinson	Swedish Academy, Seat No.15; 1978-2018 (inactive 1989-2018)	Succeeded by Jila Mossaed
