= Court of Appeal for Northern Norrland =

Coordinates: 63°49′37.02″N 20°15′16.32″E

- Hovrätten för Övre Norrland
- Coat of arms.
- Established: 1936
- Jurisdiction: Västerbotten County; Norrbotten County
- Location: Umeå
- Appeals to: Supreme Court of Sweden
- Website: www.hovrattenovrenorrland.domstol.se

President of the Court of Appeal
- Currently: Margareta Bergström
- Since: 2012

The Court of Appeal for Northern Norrland (Swedish: Hovrätten för Övre Norrland) is a court of appeal with a court district covering the entire area of Västerbotten County and Norrbotten County. The court has its seat in Umeå, in one of the few masonry buildings still standing after the great Umeå city fire in 1888, which destroyed most of the city.

== The building for teachers ==
The large white building, built in 1886–1887 and one of the oldest in the city, was designed in a neo-Renaissance style by the architect Johan Nordquist. Because it was not made of wood it was one of the few buildings to survive the Umeå city fire of 1888. The first few years the house was used as a school for educating Volksschule teachers. The building housed the principal's residence, classrooms, an auditorium and the gym. The building was surrounded by a small park.

In the 1920s the building was no longer used as a school and during some subsequent years it served as Civic Center with both a library and a museum. The large auditorium was used as a theater and concert hall.

In the 1950s the house was built out towards the east and west. The inside of the house was later renovated several times, most recently in 1999.

== The Court of Appeal ==
On the map the area in red is the court's jurisdiction.

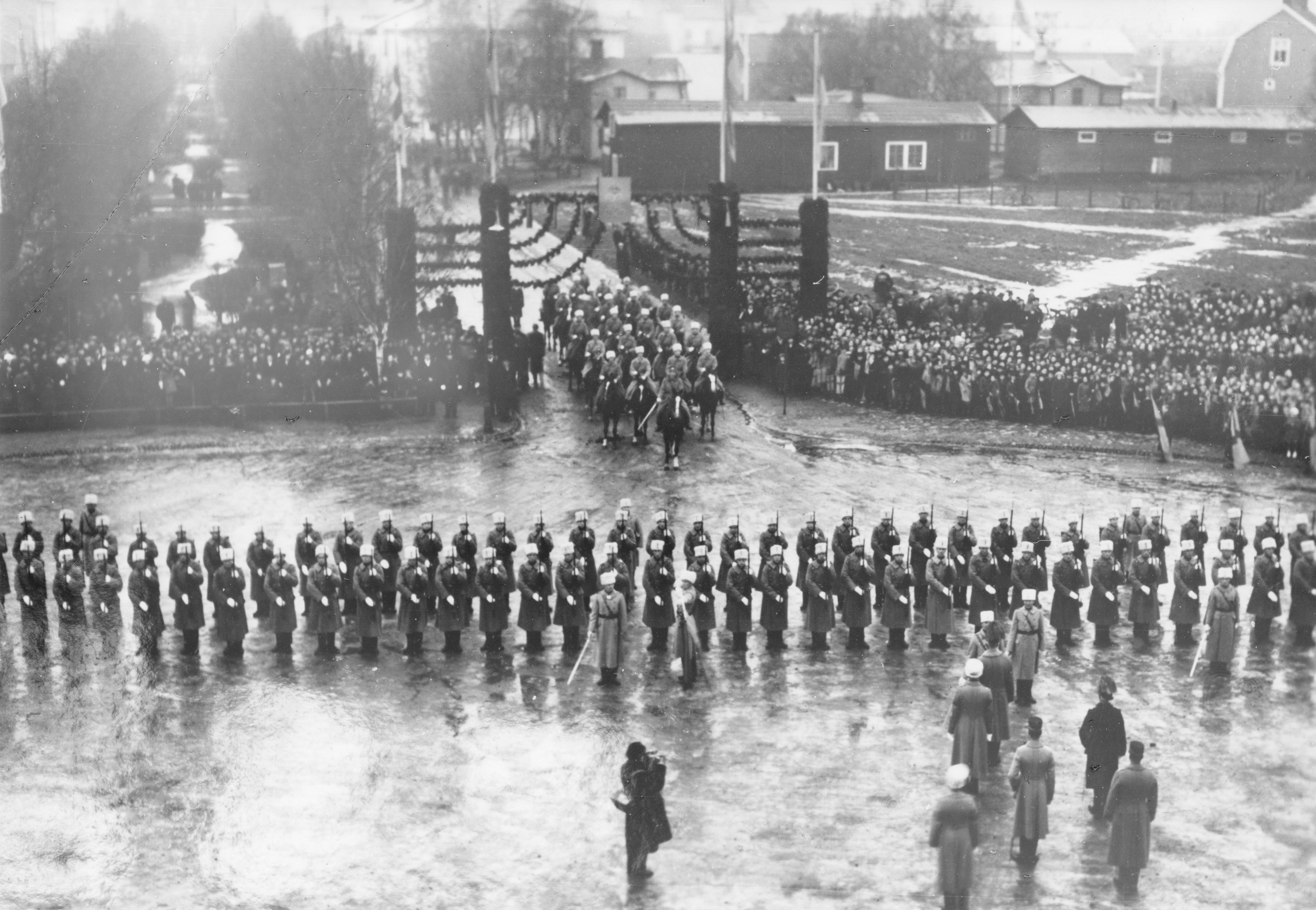
The inauguration of the Court of Appeals in Umeå. The honour guard is waiting for the arrival of king Gustaf V.

On December 16, 1936 king Gustaf V inaugurated the Court of Appeal for Northern Norrland. The court had been separated from Svea Court of Appeal in order to reduce Svea Court's workload.

=== Organization ===
The President of the Court of Appeal is Margareta Bergström since 2012. She succeeded Anders Iacobaeus. The president presides over an administrative department and a judicial department, which in turn are composed of members of the court, and a processing unit.

== See also ==
- Courts of appeal in Sweden
