= Sture Petrén =

Bror Arvid Sture Petrén
- Born: 3 October 1908; Stockholm, Sweden
- Died: 13 December 1976 (aged 68); Geneva, Switzerland
- Occupations: Diplomat, civil servant

Academic background
- Education: Lund University

Bror Arvid Sture Petrén (3 October 1908, Stockholm – 13 December 1976, Geneva) was a Swedish ambassador and civil servant.

He earned his cand.jur. degree from Lund University in 1930 and then worked at, among other places, the Svea Court of Appeal. In 1950, he became a foreign affairs counselor and head of the legal department at the Ministry for Foreign Affairs. He was appointed ambassador in 1957. From 1963 to 1967, he was the president of the Svea Court of Appeal.

In addition to his regular duties, Petrén was active in various national and international organizations, including as a member of the International Court of Justice and an expert for the United Nations General Assembly. From 1954, he was a member of the European Commission of Human Rights. Between 1971 and 1976, he was Sweden's judge at the European Court of Human Rights.

== Memberships and honors ==
In 1967, he was awarded an honorary doctorate from Lund University. He received the Royal Prize in 1968.

Petrén was elected to the Swedish Academy on 6 March 1969, taking seat number 1 after Birger Ekeberg, and was inducted on 20 December the same year. In 1969, he also became a member of the Royal Swedish Academy of Letters, History and Antiquities. He was made a Knight of the Order of the Seraphim in 1972.
