= Eric M. Runesson =

Swedish lawyer (born 1960)

Eric Michael Runesson
- Born: 26 September 1960 (age 65); Stockholm, Sweden
- Education: Stockholm University; Harvard Law School (LLM)
- Occupation: lawyer
- Employer: Supreme Court of Sweden

Justice of the Supreme Court of Sweden
- Incumbent
- Assumed office 3 September 2018

Member of the Swedish Academy (Seat No. 1)
- Incumbent
- Assumed office 20 December 2018
- Preceded by: Lotta Lotass

Eric Michael Runesson, born Andersson (born 26 September 1960), is a Swedish lawyer, member of the Swedish Academy and Justice of the Supreme Court of Sweden.

== Biography ==
Eric M. Runesson became a member of the Swedish Bar Association in 1993. He became a lawyer and partner in Sandart & Partners Law Office in 1996. Runesson became a Doctor of Law at the Stockholm School of Economics in 1996, writing his thesis on the Reconstruction of incomplete contracts. He became a lecturer in 2000.

Runesson was appointed on 14 June 2018 as Justice of the Supreme Court of Sweden, effective 3 September 2018.

On 4 October 2018 Eric Runesson was elected to the Swedish Academy. He formally entered the Academy on 20 December 2018 and succeeded Lotta Lotass on chair 1.

Cultural offices
Preceded by Lotta Lotass	Swedish Academy, Seat No.1; 2018–	Incumbent
