= Court of Appeal for Southern Norrland =

- Hovrätten för Nedre Norrland
- Coat of arms.
- Interactive map of Court of Appeal for Southern Norrland
- 62.39148°N 17.29401°E
- Established: 1948
- Location: Sundsvall
- Coordinates: 62.39148°N 17.29401°E
- Appeals to: Supreme Court of Sweden
- Website: www.hovrattenfornedrenorrland.se

The Court of Appeal for Southern Norrland (Swedish: Hovrätten för Nedre Norrland) is one of the six appellate courts in the Swedish legal system.
