= Court of Appeal for Western Sweden =

- Hovrätten för Västra Sverige
- Coat of arms.
- Interactive map of Court of Appeal for Western Sweden
- 57.706681°N 11.960861°E
- Established: 1948
- Location: Gothenburg
- Coordinates: 57.706681°N 11.960861°E
- Appeals to: Supreme Court of Sweden
- Website: www.vastrahovratten.domstol.se

The Court of Appeal for Western Sweden (Swedish: Hovrätten för Västra Sverige) is one of the six appellate courts in the Swedish legal system.
