= Svea Court of Appeal =

Swedish court of appeal

- Svea hovrätt
- Coat of arms
- Interactive map of Svea Court of Appeal
- 59.325°N 18.0625°E
- Established: 1614
- Location: Stockholm
- Coordinates: 59.325°N 18.0625°E
- Appeals to: Supreme Court of Sweden
- Website: www.domstol.se/svea-hovratt/

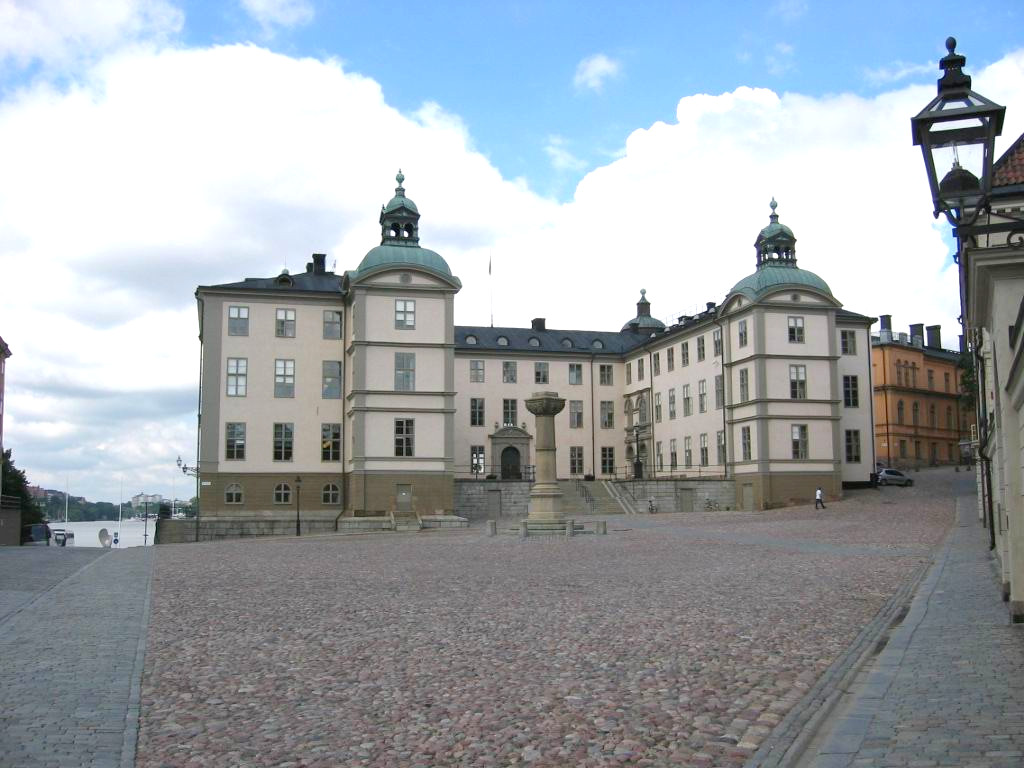
The Wrangel Palace on Riddarholmen, the seat of the Svea Court of Appeal

Svea Court of Appeal (Swedish: Svea hovrätt, lit. 'Svea Royal Court'), located in Stockholm, is one of six appellate courts in the Swedish legal system, as well as the oldest Swedish court currently in use (the Supreme Court being constituted only in 1789, over 150 years later). It is located in the Wrangel Palace, on Riddarholmen islet in Gamla Stan, the old town of Stockholm.

== History ==
The Svea Court of Appeal was founded in 1614 and was the highest court in Sweden until 1789, when the Supreme Court of Sweden was established.

Among people sentenced to death by the court was Nicolaus Olai Campanius, convicted of being a Catholic, and Jacob Johan Anckarström, convicted of the assassination of Gustaf III of Sweden.

=== Presidents ===
The chief administrator of the Svea Court of Appeal is called the president (Swedish: hovrättspresident).

- 1614–1633: Magnus Brahe
- 1633–1640: Gabriel Gustafsson Oxenstierna
- 1641–1661: Per Brahe
- 1661–1668: Seved Bååt
- 1668–1673: Johan Gyllenstierna af Lundholm
- 1674–1677: Bengt Horn af Åminne
- 1677–1680: Knut Kurck
- 1680–1682: Magnus Gabriel De la Gardie
- 1682–1695: Gustaf Adolph De la Gardie
- 1695–1703: Lars Wallenstedt
- 1703–1714: Gabriel Falkenberg af Sandemar
- 1715–1716: Reinhold Johan von Fersen
- 1718–1723: Carl Gyllenstierna
- 1723: Gabriel Stierncrona
- 1723–1731: Pehr Scheffer
- 1731–1736: Hans Reinhold von Fersen
- 1736–1743: Otto Reinhold Strömfelt
- 1743–1750: Carl Frolich
- 1750–1751: Carl Gustaf Löwenhielm
- 1751–1753: Henrik Hammarberg
- 1753–1768: Johan Gerdesschöld
- 1768–1772: Adam Fredenstierna
- 1772–1787: Johan Rosir
- 1787–1810: Carl Axel Trolle-Wachtmeister
- 1810–1826: Henning Adolph von Strokirch
- 1826–1833: Joshua Sylvander
- 1833–1835: Jonas Evelius
- 1836–1845: Eric Gabriel von Rosen
- 1845–1856: Carl Eric Isberg
- 1856–1867: Gustaf Adolf Vive Sparre
- 1867–1870: Ludvig Almqvist
- 1870–1880: Louis Gerhard De Geer
- 1880–1889: Carl Johan Berg
- 1889–1899: Nils Henrik Vult von Steyern
- 1899–1910: Johan Erik Elliot
- 1910–1918: Ivar Afzelius
- 1918–1920: Hjalmar Westring
- 1920–1931: Erik Marks von Würtemberg
- 1931–1946: Birger Ekeberg
- 1946–1950: Arthur Lindhagen
- 1950–1957: Harry Guldberg
- 1957–1963: Herman Zetterberg
- 1963–1967: Sture Petrén
- 1967–1983: Sten Rudholm
- 1983–1995: Birgitta Blom
- 1996–2007: Johan Hirschfeldt
- 2008–: Fredrik Wersäll

== Buildings ==
The Svea Court of Appeal is located in several buildings on Riddarholmen. Apart from the Wrangel Palace, which is the main building, it also has divisions in i.a. the Hessenstein Palace, the Stenbock Palace and the Schering-Rosenhane Palace.

== See also ==
- Courts of appeal in Sweden

== Literature ==
- Korpiola, Mia (ed.): The Svea Court of Appeal on the Early Modern Period: Historical Reinterpretations and New Perspectives. (Rättshistoriska studier, 26.) Stockholm: Institutet för Rättshistorisk Forskning, 2014. ISSN 0534-2724. ISBN 978-91-86645-08-3
