= Scania and Blekinge Court of Appeal =

Swedish court of appeal

- Hovrätten över Skåne och Blekinge
- Coat of arms.
- Interactive map of Scania and Blekinge Court of Appeal
- 55.6069°N 12.9908°E
- Established: 1821
- Location: Malmö
- Coordinates: 55.6069°N 12.9908°E
- Appeals to: Supreme Court of Sweden
- Website: www.hovrattenskaneblekinge.domstol.se

The Scania and Blekinge Court of Appeal (Swedish: Hovrätten över Skåne och Blekinge) is one of the six appellate courts in the Swedish legal system. The country's courts of appeal deal with legal cases that have been appealed to the county district courts. They also train lawyers to become judges and are responsible for giving opinions to the government on new legislation.

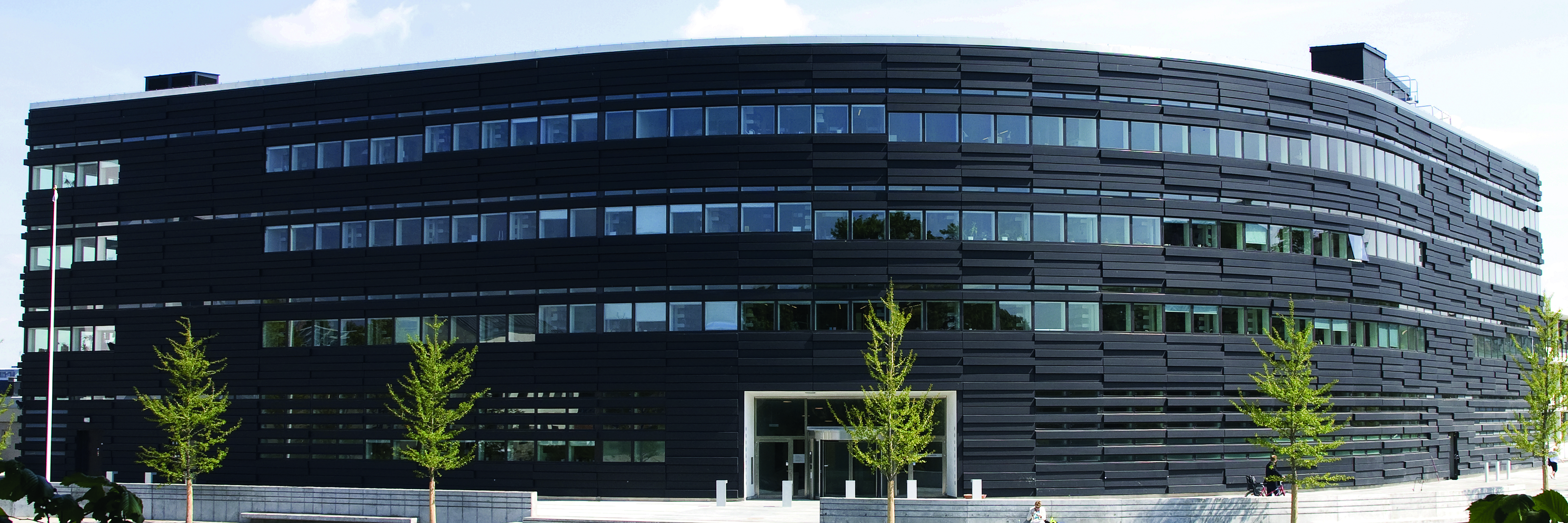
Scania and Blekinge Court of Appeal. The building was designed by Danish architect Kim Holst Jensen of Schmidt Hammer Lassen Architects.
