= Sven Romanus =

Swedish politician and civil servant (1906–2005)

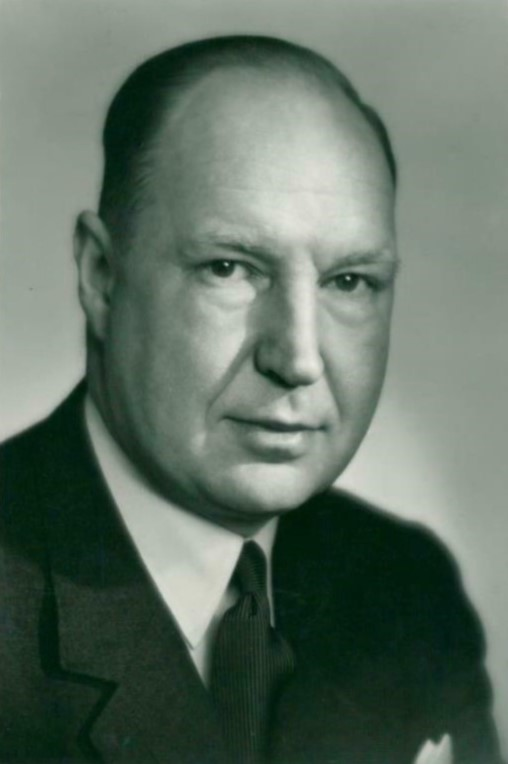

Acting Deputy Prime Minister of Sweden
- In office 18 October 1978 – 12 October 1979
- Monarch: Carl XVI Gustaf
- Prime Minister: Ola Ullsten
- Preceded by: Ola Ullsten
- Succeeded by: Ingemar Mundebo

Minister for Justice
- In office 8 October 1976 – 12 October 1979
- Monarch: Carl XVI Gustaf
- Prime Minister: Thorbjörn Fälldin; Ola Ullsten
- Preceded by: Lennart Geijer
- Succeeded by: Håkan Winberg

President of the Supreme Court of Sweden
- In office 1969–1973
- Monarch: Gustaf VI Adolf
- Prime Minister: Olof Palme
- Preceded by: Nils Beckman
- Succeeded by: Sven Edling

Justice of the Supreme Court of Sweden
- In office 1951–1969

Personal details
- Born: 19 January 1906 Karlstad, Sweden
- Died: 30 April 2005 (aged 99) Stockholm, Sweden
- Party: Independent
- Spouse: Alfhild Sandfærhus (m. 1932; died 1996)
- Children: 3
- Profession: Jurist

Sven Einar Romanus (19 January 1906 – 30 April 2005) was a Swedish civil servant. He served as President of the Supreme Court of Sweden from 1969 to 1973, as Minister for Justice from 1976 to 1979 and as Acting Deputy Prime Minister of Sweden from 1978 to 1979.

== Early life ==
Romanus was born on 19 January 1906 in Karlstad, Sweden, the son of lector Anton Romanus and his wife Reidunn (née Lindboe). He was uncle of Gabriel Romanus. Romanus passed studentexamen in Östersund in 1924. Romanus received a Candidate of Law degree in Stockholm in 1929.

== Career ==
Romanus worked as a law clerk in the Svea Court of Appeal in 1929, became an assessor in 1939, and was director in the Ministry of Justice from 1944 to 1947. Romanus was appointed Hovrättsråd in 1946 and was a member of the Swedish state legislative committee (Lagberedningen) from 1947 to 1950. He served as a Justice of the Supreme Court of Sweden from 1951 to 1973, as department chairman in the Supreme Court in 1966, and as President of the Supreme Court of Sweden from 1969 to 1973. Romanus was Minister for Justice from 1976 to 1979.

Romanus was also a member, secretary, chairman etc of different committees, commissions, investigations, and councils. He was notary and secretary in various Parliamentary committees in the Riksdag from 1936 to 1942, a substitute in the Labour Court (Arbetsdomstolen) in 1941 and vice chairman from 1949 to 1950. Romanus was assigned to the Ministry of Ecclesiastical Affairs and in Ministry of Justice from 1941 to 1943, was secretary of the 1941 års befolkningsutredning ("1941 Population Survey") from 1941 to 1944, the Parliamentary Investigation Commission (Parlamentariska undersökningskommissionen) from 1945 to 1947, and served as Deputy Justice Ombudsman from 1948 to 1949. Furthermore, Romanus was vice chairman of the Swedish Press Council from 1956 to 1959, chairman there from 1960 to 1976, chairman of the Swedish Youth Correctional Board (Ungdomsfängelsenämnden) from 1958 to 1969, of the Council on Legislation from 1962 to 1964, of the Kommittén för lagstiftning om yttrande- och tryckfrihet ("Committee on Legislation on Freedom of Expression and Press") from 1965 to 1972, if the Massmedieutredningen ("Mass Media Investigation") from 1970 to 1976, of the Programrådet för radioaktivt avfall ("Radioactive Waste Program Council") from 1980 to 1981, and of the Nämnden för hantering av använt kärnbränsle ("Committee for the Management of Spent Nuclear Fuel") from 1981 to 1984.

== Personal life ==
In 1932 he married Alfhild Sandfærhus (1909–1996), the daughter of Hans Sandfærhus and Kari (née Hegstad). They had three children: Barbro (born 1934), Kurt (born 1937), and Gunilla (born 1943).

== Awards and decorations ==
- (Sweden) Commander Grand Cross of the Order of the Polar Star (6 June 1961)
- (Sweden) Seraphim Medal (1980)

Legal offices
Preceded by Nils Beckman	President of the Supreme Court of Sweden; 1969–1973	Succeeded by Sven Edling
Government offices
Preceded by Lennart Geijer	Minister for Justice; 8 October 1976 – 12 October 1979	Succeeded by Håkan Winberg
Preceded by Ola Ullsten	Deputy Prime Minister of Sweden; 18 October 1978 – 12 October 1979	Succeeded by Ingemar Mundebo
