= Ragnar Gyllenswärd =

Swedish jurist (1891–1967)

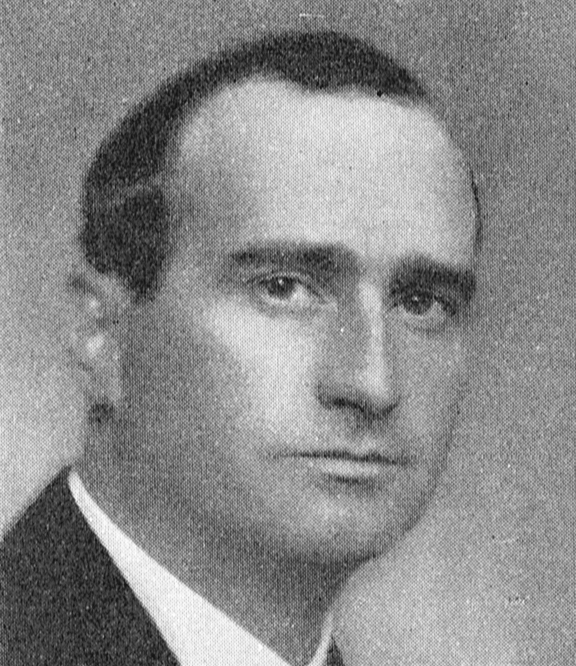

President of the Supreme Court of Sweden
- In office 1 May 1952 – 1958
- Monarch: Gustaf VI Adolf
- Prime Minister: Tage Erlander
- Preceded by: Axel Afzelius
- Succeeded by: Carl Gustaf Hellquist

Justice of the Supreme Court of Sweden
- In office 1 October 1935 – 31 August 1958

Parliamentary Ombudsman
- In office 1 October 1933 – 30 September 1935
- Preceded by: Seve Ellenius Ekberg
- Succeeded by: Nils Ljunggren

Personal details
- Born: Ragnar Hugo Ferdinand Gyllenswärd; 11 August 1891 Växjö, Sweden
- Died: 26 February 1967 (aged 75) Stockholm, Sweden
- Spouse: Anna Posse (m. 1919–1967)
- Children: 3
- Education: Uppsala University
- Profession: Jurist

Ragnar Hugo Ferdinand Gyllenswärd (11 August 1891 – 26 February 1967) was a Swedish jurist who served as a justice of the Supreme Court of Sweden for 23 years, including six years as its president. Gyllenswärd started his academic career at Uppsala University with studies in the humanities before obtaining a law degree. He worked in various legal roles, including contributing to legislative matters at the Ministry of Justice and helping draft a Swedish-Norwegian water rights convention. He later served on a committee revising inheritance law and contributed to reforms related to death declarations. Gyllenswärd held several significant positions, including Parliamentary Ombudsman and Supreme Court Justice, where he was recognized for his legal expertise and commitment to maintaining and developing legal standards. He was also engaged in historical studies, particularly in personal and cultural history.

== Early life ==
Gyllenswärd was born on 11 August 1891 in Växjö Cathedral Parish in Växjö, Kronoberg County, Sweden, the son of the major and the infirmary clerk Oskar Hugo Gyllenswärd and his wife Wendla Wilhelmina Isabella Hultman. Gyllenswärd completed his secondary school examination at Växjö Higher General School i Växjö in 1909 and enrolled at Uppsala University the same year. He earned a Bachelor of Arts degree in 1911, with Romance and Nordic languages as his main subjects. He deepened his familiarity with the French language and culture through studies at the University of Grenoble, and he maintained a lifelong interest in the humanities in general. Gyllenswärd was particularly captivated by historical works, especially those of a biographical nature, and his knowledge of past eras, both their history and their stories, was extensive. He received a Candidate of Law degree in 1916.

== Career ==
After serving in the district court, he joined the Göta Court of Appeal in 1918, where he held positions as an extraordinary legal clerk (fiskal) and adjunct member until 1923. From 1923 to 1929, he served as an assessor, and from 1929 to 1930, and for a short period in 1935, he held the office of Court of Appeal judge. His active service in the Court of Appeal was interrupted as early as 1925 when he became an acting judge referee and later became attached to the Ministry of Justice's legislative department, where he served as an extraordinary member from 1927 to 1929. Gyllenswärd served as secretary to the experts investigating the issue of amending the 1905 convention with Norway regarding shared lakes and waterways from 1925 to 1928. He was a member of the Legislative Council (Lagberedningen) from 1929 to 1932 and served as a minister without portfolio in Carl Gustaf Ekman's second cabinet and Felix Hamrin's cabinet from 7 June 1930, to 24 September 1932. He was then the state secretary in the Ministry of Justice from 1932 to 1933 and the Parliamentary Ombudsman from 1933 to 1935. Gyllenswärd held the position of judge referee from 1930 to 1934. He served as a justice of the Supreme Court of Sweden from 1935 to 1958, a member of the Council on Legislation from 1946 to 1948, and president of the Supreme Court of Sweden from 1952 to 1958. He was also a member of the Permanent Court of Arbitration in The Hague, Netherlands from 1963.

Gyllenswärd contributed to the Nytt juridiskt arkiv from 1939, serving as co-editor from 1941 and as chief editor from 1943. His significant contributions to the journal were mainly in Section I, the judicial section, while his involvement with Section II, the legislative section, was more formal. He completely stepped down from the latter section with the 1961 edition and from the former with the 1963 edition. Gyllenswärd was the first editor for Sweden in the Nordisk Domssamling, which began publication in 1958, and he remained in this role until the year he died. He also contributed to the Svensk Juristtidning and Tidsskrift for Rettsvitenskap.

== Personal life ==
On 3 July 1919 in Bergunda Church in Bergunda, Växjö Municipality, Kronoberg County, Gyllenswärd married Countess Anna Aurora Maria Posse (30 June 1894 – 18 March 1967), the daughter of Count Knut Arvid Posse and Baroness Sigrid Elisabeth Carolina Gustafsdotter Leijonhufvud. They had three children: Christina (1920–2019), Isabella (born 1921), and Birgitta (born 1922).

== Death ==
Gyllenswärd died on 26 February 1967 in Hedvig Eleonora Parish, Stockholm County. The burial took place on 7 March 1967 in Hedvig Eleonora Church in Stockholm. He was buried in Bergunda.

== Awards and decorations ==
- (Sweden) Commander Grand Cross of the Order of the Polar Star (6 June 1940)
- (Sweden) Commander 1st Class the Order of the Polar Star (6 June 1931)
- (Sweden) Knight of the Order of the Polar Star (1930)
- (Norway) Commander with Star of the Order of St. Olav

== Honours ==
- Honorary Doctor of Law, Stockholm University College (28 May 1957)

Legal offices
Preceded by John Alsén	State Secretary in the Ministry of Justice; 1932–1933	Succeeded by Gustaf Eklund
Preceded by Seve Ellenius Ekberg	Parliamentary Ombudsman; 1933–1935	Succeeded by Nils Ljunggren
Preceded by Axel Afzelius	President of the Supreme Court of Sweden; 1952–1958	Succeeded by Carl Gustaf Hellquist
