= Sven Edling =

Swedish jurist (1908–2000)

President of the Supreme Court of Sweden
- In office 1973–1976
- Monarch: Carl XVI Gustaf
- Prime Minister: Olof Palme
- Preceded by: Sven Romanus
- Succeeded by: Otto Petrén

Justice of the Supreme Court of Sweden
- In office 1953–1973

Personal details
- Born: Sven Åke Edling; 9 December 1908 Stockholm, Sweden
- Died: 23 August 2000 (aged 91) Stockholm, Sweden
- Spouse: Gulli Bärnheim (m. 1934–2000)
- Children: 3
- Profession: Jurist

Sven Åke Edling (9 December 1908 – 23 August 2000) was a Swedish civil servant. He served as President of the Supreme Court of Sweden from 1973 to 1976.

== Early life ==
Edling was born on 9 December 1908 in Gustaf Vasa Parish, Stockholm, Sweden, the son of the district court judge (häradshövding) Holdo Edling and his wife Elsa (née Lundberg). He passed studentexamen in Kristianstad in 1927 and received a Candidate of Law degree from Lund University in 1931.

== Career ==
Edling carried out court service in Gärd and Albo Hundred's judicial districts (Gärds och Albo häraders domsaga) in Kristianstad County from 1931 to 1934 and became an extra legal clerk (fiskal) in 1935. He served as an assessor in the Svea Court of Appeal in Stockholm in 1943 (temporary officer in 1941), and as director (byråchef) for law matters in the Ministry of Justice in 1946 (acting in 1945). Edling became hovrättsråd at the Court of Appeal for Southern Norrland in Sundsvall in 1947 and served as a state secretary at the Ministry of Justice in 1949. He became a Justice of the Supreme Court of Sweden in 1953. Edling served as chairman of the Council on Legislation from 1965 to 1969, and as department chairman in the Supreme Court of Sweden in 1969 and as President of the Supreme Court of Sweden from 1973 to 1976. After that, Edling again served as chairman of the Council on Legislation from 1976 to 1980.

Edling also served as a secretary in the Reparations for War Damages Investigation (krigsskadeutredningen) with several investigations from 1939 to 1941, in the Second Law Committee from 1941 to 1942, and as legal assistant to the Chief of the Army from 1947 to 1953. He was a member of the central board of administration of the Oscar II's Jubilee Fund from 1955 to 1974, served as chairman of the Oscar II's Jubilee Fund, of the Gustaf V's Jubilee Fund, of the Gustaf V's 80th Anniversary Fund, and of the Gustaf V's 90th Anniversary Fund from 1974 to 1983. He was also inspector of Mörby Secondary School from 1955 to 1958.

== Personal life ==
In 1934, Edling married Gulli Bärnheim (1909–2005), the daughter of John Nilsson and Selma Persson. He was the father of jurist Staffan Edling (1936–1992), Catharina (born 1939), and Måns (born 1946).

== Death ==
Edling died on 23 August 2000 in Engelbrekt Parish, Stockholm, Sweden. He was interred at Bromma Cemetery on 28 September 2000.

== Awards and decorations ==
- (Sweden) Commander Grand Cross of the Order of the Polar Star (21 November 1963)
- (Sweden) H. M. The King's Medal, 12th size gold (silver-gilt) medal worn around the neck on the Order of the Seraphim ribbon (1979)
- (Sweden) Seraphim Medal (1984)

Legal offices
| Preceded by Sven Romanus | President of the Supreme Court of Sweden; 1973–1976 | Succeeded by Otto Petrén |
