= Bengt Hult =

Swedish civil servant (1917–2008)

President of the Supreme Court of Sweden
- In office 1979–1984
- Monarch: Carl XVI Gustaf
- Prime Minister: Ola Ullsten; Thorbjörn Fälldin; Olof Palme
- Preceded by: Otto Petrén
- Succeeded by: Carl Holmberg

President of the Labour Court of Sweden
- In office 1 January 1964 – 1 November 1973
- Monarch: Gustaf VI Adolf
- Prime Minister: Tage Erlander; Olof Palme
- Preceded by: Gunnar Dahlman
- Succeeded by: Hans Stark

Justice of the Supreme Court of Sweden
- In office 1 October 1963 – 30 December 1963
- In office 1 November 1973 – 1 November 1979

Personal details
- Born: Bengt Vilhelm Hult; 28 August 1917 Västerås, Sweden
- Died: 29 October 2008 (aged 91) Stockholm, Sweden
- Spouse(s): Anna-Greta Öhrström (m. 1945; died 1982) Sylvia Björkdahl (m. 1984–2008)
- Children: 2
- Education: Stockholm University College
- Profession: Jurist

Bengt Vilhelm Hult (28 August 1917 – 29 October 2008) was a Swedish civil servant. He served as President of the Labour Court of Sweden from 1964 to 1973 and as President of the Supreme Court of Sweden from 1979 to 1984.

== Early life ==
Hult was born on 28 August 1917 in Västerås, Sweden, the son of Reinhold Hult and his wife Hanna (née Johansson). He passed studentexamen in Västerås in 1939. He received a Candidate of Law degree from Stockholm University College in 1941.

== Career ==
Hult carried out court service in Västmanland central judicial district (Västmanlands mellersta domsaga) from 1941 to 1944. He worked as an extra legal clerk (fiskal) in the Svea Court of Appeal in Stockholm in 1945, secretary in the Labour Court (Arbetsdomstolen) from 1948 to 1950, assessor in the Svea Court of Appeal in 1952. Hult was a substitute in the Labour Court from 1953 to 1961, member and secretary in the Penal Code Commission (strafflagberedningen) from 1953 to 1956. He was also vice chairman of the Swedish Press Council from 1961.

He became hovrättsråd in 1961, worked as acting director (byråchef) in the National Board of Health and Welfare from 1952 to 1953, and as director (byråchef) for law matters in the Ministry of Justice from 1957 to 1961. He was state secretary there from 1961 to 1963. Hult became a Justice of the Supreme Court of Sweden on 1 October 1963 but already on 30 December 1963, the King in Council granted Hult leave at the end of 1963 to instead become President of the Labor Court of Sweden from 1 January 1964. On 21 September 1973, the King in Council appointed Hult, as Justice from 1 November 1973. On 28 June 1979, the Swedish government appointed Hult to be President of the Supreme Court of Sweden from 1 November 1979. He served in this position until 1984.

== Personal life ==
In 1945, Hult married Anna-Greta Öhrström (1919–1982), the daughter of Valdemar Öhrström and Gunborg (née Andersson). In 1984, he married Sylvia Björkdahl (born 1936), the daughter of Axel Björkdahl and Signe (née Nilsson).

== Death ==
Hult died on 29 October 2008 in Stockholm, Sweden. He was interred at Solna Cemetery in Solna Municipality near Stockholm.

== Awards and decorations ==
- (Sweden) Commander Grand Cross of the Order of the Polar Star (6 June 1973)
- (Sweden) H. M. The King's Medal, 12th size gold (silver-gilt) medal worn around the neck on the Order of the Seraphim ribbon (1984)

== Honours ==
- Honorary Doctorate of Law, Stockholm University (1978)

Legal offices
Preceded by Gunnar Dahlman	President of the Labour Court of Sweden; 1964–1973	Succeeded by Hans Stark
Preceded by Otto Petrén	President of the Supreme Court of Sweden; 1979–1984	Succeeded by Carl Holmberg
