= Nils Beckman =

Swedish jurist and civil servant (1902–1972)

President of the Supreme Court of Sweden
- In office 1963–1969
- Monarch: Gustaf VI Adolf
- Prime Minister: Tage Erlander
- Preceded by: Carl Gustaf Hellquist
- Succeeded by: Sven Romanus

Justice of the Supreme Court of Sweden
- In office 1947–1969

Personal details
- Born: Nils Arvid Teodor Beckman; 30 October 1902 Stockholm, Sweden
- Died: 22 January 1972 (aged 69) Stockholm, Sweden
- Spouse: Sigrid Karlsson (m. 1927–1972)
- Children: 3
- Education: Stockholm University College
- Profession: Jurist

Nils Arvid Teodor Beckman (30 October 1902 – 22 January 1972) was a Swedish jurist and civil servant. He served as President of the Supreme Court of Sweden from 1963 to 1969.

Beckman's legislative work, both in the criminal law committee and in other committees, continued even after he became a member of the Supreme Court in 1947. However, for more than two decades, until his retirement in 1969, he devoted the majority of his efforts to judicial work at the highest level, serving as the President of the Supreme Court from 1963. His legal writings primarily focused on criminal law and family law. His contributions to the reform work that led to the new Penal Code made it natural for him to become the chief editor of the extensive and well-known commentary on the Penal Code, recognized by all Swedish jurists. Equally well-known and utilized were the case summaries in family law that he published in the Svensk Juristtidning ("Swedish Journal of Law") starting in 1937, with the last one just a few months before his death.

== Early life ==
Beckman was born on 30 October 1902 in Stockholm, Sweden, the son of Knut Beckman, Head of Division to the National [Swedish] Office for Administrative Rationalization and Economy (statskommissarie), and his wife Ruth Helena Fredrika Hammarstedt. He passed studentexamen in 1920 and received a Candidate of Law degree from Stockholm University College in 1923.

== Career ==
Beckman carried out court service in Sollentuna and Färentuna judicial districts (Sollentuna och Färentuna domsaga) before he entered the Svea Court of Appeal in Stockholm, where he became an assessor in 1934. As a young Court of Appeal assessor, he was given the responsible task of, as specially appointed chairman of Västmanland Eastern Judicial District Assize Court (Västmanlands östra domsagas häradsrätt) lead the investigation in perhaps the most noted criminal case of the 1930s, the trial against the so-called Sala gang from 1936 to 1937. Beckman was appointed hovrättsråd in 1940 and Justice of the Supreme Court of Sweden in 1947. He served as deputy to the Parliamentary Ombudsman from 1944 to 1948, and as President of the Supreme Court of Sweden from 1963 to 1969.

Beckman served as secretary in the Committee on Agriculture in 1935, secretary in the committee concerning private employees in 1935, and adviser in the Ministry of Health and Social Affairs for legislation on association and negotiation rights in 1936. He was the secretary in the criminal law committee (straffrättskommittén) from 1937 to 1940, focusing on legislation related to crime against property.

Furthermore, Beckman was a member and secretary of the criminal law committee from 1940 to 1953, a board member of the Swedish Association of Criminalists (Svenska kriminalistföreningen) in 1940, vice-chairman from 1954 to 1959, and chairman from 1959. He also served as a mediator in marriage disputes from 1941 to 1947, chaired the Swedish Internment Board (Interneringsnämnden) from 1943 to 1945, was a member of the Council on Legislation from 1949 to 1950, and served as chairman from 1958 to 1960. Additionally, he acted as the Swedish editor for the Tidsskrift for Rettsvitenskap from 1951 to 1963. Beckman also served as the vice-chairman of the National Swedish Association against Tuberculosis (Svenska nationalföreningen mot tuberkulos) from 1952 to 1966 and the National Swedish Association against Pulmonary Heart Disease (Svenska Nationalföreningen mot Hjärt- och Lungsjukdomar) from 1952 onwards.

Beckman was the publisher of the Nytt juridiskt arkiv (together with others) in 1956, vice chairman of the Insurance Law Association (Försäkringsjuridiska föreningen) in 1956–1959, 1962–1965, chairman of the Commission for the Parliamentary Ombudsman and municipalities in 1956–1957, and in the Rental Legislation Committee (hyreslagskommittén) in 1957–1961.

== Personal life ==
In 1927, Beckman married the lawyer Sigrid Karlsson (1899–1989), the daughter of Anders Karlsson and Karin Söderström. They had three children: hovrättsråd Sven Beckman (1929–1979), Vera Rut Karin (born 1934), and the Justice of the Supreme Court of Sweden, Lars K. Beckman (1936–2022).

== Death ==
Beckman died on 22 January 1972 in Adolf Fredrik Parish in Stockholm, Sweden. He was interred on 11 February 1972 in Norra begravningsplatsen in Solna Municipality, near Stockholm.

== Awards and decorations ==
- (Sweden) Commander Grand Cross of the Order of the Polar Star (6 June 1957)

== Honours ==
- Honorary Doctor of Law, Stockholm University College (1953)

== Selected bibliography ==
- Beckman, Nils (1947). Studier över brottsligheten och dess bekämpande i Sverige [Studies on crime and its prevention in Sweden] (in Swedish). Stockholm: Norstedt. SELIBR 893414.
- Beckman, Nils (1954). Svensk familjerättspraxis [Swedish family law practice] (in Swedish). Stockholm: Norstedt. SELIBR 483466.
- Beckman, Nils (1959). Svensk domstolspraxis i internationell rätt [Swedish court practice in international law] (in Swedish). Stockholm: Norstedt. SELIBR 415340.

Legal offices
Preceded by Carl Gustaf Hellquist	President of the Supreme Court of Sweden; 1963–1969	Succeeded by Sven Romanus
