= Carl Gustaf Hellquist =

Swedish jurist (1896–1973)

President of the Supreme Court of Sweden
- In office 1958–1963
- Monarch: Gustaf VI Adolf
- Prime Minister: Tage Erlander
- Preceded by: Ragnar Gyllenswärd
- Succeeded by: Nils Beckman

Justice of the Supreme Court of Sweden
- In office 1943–1963

Personal details
- Born: Carl Gustaf Ingemar Hellquist; 4 September 1896 Lund, Sweden
- Died: 21 December 1973 (aged 77) Stockholm, Sweden
- Spouse: Gertrud Bagge (m. 1923–1973)
- Children: 3
- Education: Lund University
- Profession: Jurist

Carl Gustaf Ingemar Hellquist (4 September 1896 – 21 December 1973) was a Swedish jurist who served as a Justice of the Supreme Court of Sweden for 20 years, including five years as its president until his retirement in 1963. Before joining the Supreme Court, he had a distinguished career in law, including serving as state secretary during the early years of World War II, where he played a key role in legislative matters. Known for his exceptional ability to collaborate and his commitment to clear legal language, Hellquist was also deeply involved in other significant legal and social responsibilities, such as chairing the Youth Prison Board.

== Early life ==
Hellquist was born on 4 September 1896 in Lund, Sweden, the son of Professor Elof Hellquist and his wife Ingrid Zetterström. He was the brother of district judge Torvald Hellquist. He passed studentexamen in Gothenburg in 1914 and the reserve officer examination in 1916, and served as a reserve officer in the Halland Regiment from 1916 to 1923. Hellquist received a Bachelor of Arts degree from Lund University in 1918, and a Candidate of Law degree in 1922.

== Career ==
After completing his service as a court clerk from 1922 to 1925, Hellquist entered service at the Scania and Blekinge Court of Appeal, where he served from 1925 to 1929 as an extra legal clerk (fiskal) and adjunct member, and was an assessor from 1929 to 1936, and a Court of Appeal judge from 1936 to 1937.

However, he left active service at the Court of Appeal as early as 1932 to assist with the preparation of legislative matters in the Ministry of Justice in Stockholm, a task that lasted until 1935, with only a brief interruption for a short-term appointment as judge referee in 1933. At the same time, he also held several appointments as a rapporteur in the Council on Legislation. From 1935 to 1939, Hellquist was the head of the legislative affairs division (chief of the Criminal Law Office (straffrättsbyrån)) in the Ministry of Justice. He served as a regular judge referee from 1937 to 1943 and acted as director-general for administrative affairs (expeditionschef) in the Ministry of Justice in 1939. From 1939 to 1943, he was state secretary in the same ministry, a demanding role, especially given the extensive and urgent legislative activity during the first years of World War II.

In addition to his departmental duties, Hellquist was engaged in several other legislative assignments. For example, he was a member of a 1935 committee investigating the revision of the penal code for the Swedish Armed Forces. He served from 1936 to 1939 as an alternate for the Swedish Ombudsman for Military Affairs (Militieombudsmannen) and was the chairman of the Swedish Internment Board (Interneringsnämnden) from 1942 to 1943, as well as the chairman of the Swedish Youth Correctional Board (Ungdomsfängelsenämnden) from 1946 to 1958.

Hellquist was appointed Justice of the Supreme Court of Sweden in 1943, a position he held until 1963, and served as President of the Supreme Court of Sweden from 1958 until his retirement in 1963.

He was also the editor of Nytt juridiskt arkiv (Division II) from 1949 to 1955 and, from 1955 onward, the publisher of Sveriges rikes lag (The Law of the Realm of Sweden).

== Personal life ==
In 1923, Hellquist married Gertrud Bagge (1898), the daughter of the lawyer Otto Bagge and Lillie Bergh. They had three children: Lena (born 1925), Lilli-Marie (born 1928), and Gustaf (born 1934).

== Death ==
Hellquist died on 21 December 1973 in Stockholm, Sweden. The funeral service was held on 28 December 1973 at Adolf Fredrik Church.

== Awards and decorations ==
- (Sweden) Commander Grand Cross of the Order of the Polar Star (6 June 1953)
- (Sweden) Commander 1st Class the Order of the Polar Star (15 November 1945)
- (Sweden) Commander of the Order of the Polar Star (15 November 1941)
- (Sweden) Knight of the Order of the Polar Star (1937)

Legal offices
| Preceded by Gunnar Dahlman | State Secretary in the Ministry of Justice; 1939–1943 | Succeeded by Gösta Walin |
| Preceded by Ragnar Gyllenswärd | President of the Supreme Court of Sweden; 1958–1963 | Succeeded by Nils Beckman |
