= Otto Petrén =

Swedish jurist (1912–1990)

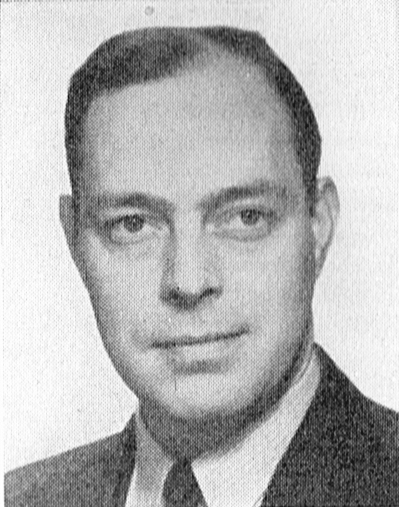

President of the Supreme Court of Sweden
- In office 1975–1979
- Monarch: Carl XVI Gustaf
- Prime Minister: Olof Palme; Thorbjörn Fälldin; Ola Ullsten
- Preceded by: Sven Edling
- Succeeded by: Bengt Hult

Justice of the Supreme Court of Sweden
- In office 1957–1975

Personal details
- Born: Gustaf Otto Edvard Petrén; 7 October 1912 Lund, Sweden
- Died: 12 October 1990 (aged 78) Stockholm, Sweden
- Spouse: Margit Winroth (m. 1942; died 1990)
- Children: 3
- Education: Lund University
- Profession: Jurist

Gustaf Otto Edvard Petrén (7 October 1912 – 12 October 1990) was a Swedish civil servant. He served as President of the Supreme Court of Sweden from 1975 to 1979.

== Early life ==
Petrén was born on 7 October 1912 in Lund, Sweden, the son of professor Gustaf Petrén and his wife Torborg (née Sylwan). He was the brother of the lawyer and the judge Gustaf Petrén and the educator and the churchman Erik Petrén. Otto was the nephew of psychiatrist and politician Alfred Petrén and of physician Karl Petrén.

Otto Petrén passed studentexamen in Lund in 1930. He received a Candidate of Law degree from Lund University in 1935.

== Career ==
Petrén carried out court service in Vemmenhögs, Ljunits and Herrestad Hundred's judicial districts (Vemmenhögs, Ljunits och Herrestads häraders domsaga) from 1935 to 1938. He worked as an extra legal clerk (fiskal) in the Scania and Blekinge Court of Appeal in 1939, as court secretary in Frosta and Eslöv judicial districts (Frosta och Eslövs domsaga) from 1942 to 1944, and as assessor in 1952 (temporary officer in 1946). He became hovrättsråd in the Scania and Blekinge Court of Appeal in 1953 and a Justice of the Supreme Court of Sweden in 1957. Petrén was a member of the Council on Legislation from 1965 to 1969, and served as chairman there from 1972 to 1973. He served as President of the Supreme Court of Sweden from 1975 to 1979.

Petrén was secretary in the 1948 Vagrancy Inquiry (1948 års lösdriveriutredning) in 1948, in the Second Law Committee in 1949, and had legislative assignments from 1950 to 1953. He was director (byråchef) for law matters in the Ministry of Justice in 1953, and became director general for administrative affairs (expeditionschef) in the Ministry of Commerce and Industry in 1957 (acting in 1954). Petrén was a member of the National Export Credits Guarantee Board from 1955 to 1957 (vice chairman from 1956 to 1957), in the committee on questions related to the right to carry on business [in Sweden] from 1958 to 1962, chairman of the Oil Protection Inquiry (oljeskyddsutredningen) from 1963 to 1965, the Swedish National Association against Heart and Lung Diseases (Svenska nationalföreningen mot hjärt- och lungsjukdomar) from 1972, member of the Council on Legislation from 1980 to 1981 and occasionally from 1982 to 1984.

== Personal life ==
In 1942, Petrén married Margit Winroth (1915–1990), the daughter of vice consul Rolf Winroth and Carla (née Hansen). He was the father of Karin (born 1943), Rolf (born 1946), and Marianne (born 1952).

== Death ==
Edling died on 12 October 1990, in Stockholm, three months after his wife. On 11 November 1990, he was interred at his wife's family grave at Falsterbo Old Cemetery in Falsterbo in South Sweden.

== Awards and decorations ==
- (Sweden) Commander Grand Cross of the Order of the Polar Star (11 November 1967)

Legal offices
Preceded by Sven Edling	President of the Supreme Court of Sweden; 1975–1979	Succeeded by Bengt Hult
