= Petrén =

Petrén is a surname. Notable people with the surname include:

- Ann Petrén (born 1954), Swedish actress
- Karl Petrén (1868–1927), Swedish physician
- Louise Petrén-Overton (1880–1977), Swedish mathematician
- Melissa Petrén (born 1995), Swedish handballer
- Otto Petrén (1912–1990), Swedish jurist, President of the Supreme Court of Sweden
- Simon Petrén (born 1986), Swedish music producer, songwriter, and engineer
