= Anders Eka =

Justice of Swedish Supreme Court

President of the Supreme Court of Sweden
- Incumbent
- Assumed office 1 September 2018
- Monarch: Carl XVI Gustaf
- Prime Minister: Stefan Löfven; Magdalena Andersson; Ulf Kristersson
- Preceded by: Stefan Lindskog

Justice of the Supreme Court of Sweden
- In office 2013–2018

Personal details
- Born: 6 September 1961 (age 64)
- Education: Uppsala University

Anders Bror Eka (born 6 September 1961) is a Swedish lawyer. Since 2013, he is a Justice of the Supreme Court. In 2018, he was appointed Chief Justice of the Supreme Court.

Anders Eka graduated in law at Uppsala University in 1987 and did service as a law clerk at District Court in 1987–1990. He became a Legal Clerk at Svea Court of Appeal in 1991 and was appointed Associate Judge in 1995. In 1995–1997, Anders Eka worked as a Legal Adviser at the Ministry of Justice and was then Administrative Director in Svea Court of Appeal from 1997 to 2000. Appointed Judge of Appeal at Svea Court of Appeal in 2000, he was an Administrative Director at the Chancellor of Justice's Office in 2000–2003. Anders Eka was appointed Senior Judge in Stockholm District Court in 2003. In 2004–2008, he worked as Administrative Director and Chief Secreraty to the Working Committee on Constitutional Reform. Eka was appointed Senior Judge of Appeal and Head of Division in Svea Court of Appeal in 2009 and Chief Judge in Stockholm District Court in 2010. In 2013, the Government appointed him Justice of the Supreme Court (Swedish: justitieråd). In 2018, he was appointed Chief Justice of the Supreme Court. He took office on 1 September 2018.

Legal offices
Preceded by Lena Berke	Chief Judge of the Stockholm District Court; 2010–2013	Succeeded by Stefan Strömberg
Preceded by Stefan Lindskog	President of the Supreme Court of Sweden; 2018–present	Succeeded by Incumbent
