= Håkan Winberg =

Swedish politician (1931–2022)

President of the Court of Appeal for Southern Norrland
- In office 1982–1998
- Monarch: Carl XVI Gustaf
- Preceded by: Karl-Erik Skarvall
- Succeeded by: Barbro Hegrelius-Jonsson

Minister for Justice
- In office 12 October 1979 – 5 May 1981
- Monarch: Carl XVI Gustaf
- Prime Minister: Thorbjörn Fälldin
- Preceded by: Sven Romanus
- Succeeded by: Carl Axel Petri

Personal details
- Born: Sven Håkan Winberg; 30 July 1931 Ånge, Sweden
- Died: 22 April 2022 (aged 90) Sundsvall, Sweden
- Party: Moderate Party
- Spouse: Ulla Greta Petersson (m. 1957)
- Profession: Jurist

Sven Håkan Winberg (30 July 1931 – 22 April 2022) was a Swedish politician. He served as a member of the Riksdag from 1971 to 1982 for the Moderate Party. He was also Minister of Justice from 1979 to 1981.

== Early life ==
Winberg was born on 30 July 1931 in Ånge, Västernorrland County, Sweden, the son of Sven Winberg and his wife Sally (née Ångman). Winberg received a Candidate of Law degree from Uppsala University in 1959.

== Career ==
Winberg worked as a secretary in the Chancellery of the conservative parties in the Riksdag from 1959 to 1960. Winberg did his clerkship from 1960 to 1962 and worked as an extra legal clerk (fiskal) at the Court of Appeal for Southern Norrland in 1963. He became assessor in 1970 and a judge (rådman) in Härnösand in 1972. In 1976, Winberg was appointed Hovrättsråd in the Court of Appeal for Southern Norrland. He then served as Minister for Justice and head of the Ministry of Justice from 1979 to 1981 and as President of the Court of Appeal for Southern Norrland from 1982 to 1998.

Winberg was chairman of the Heimdal Society (Föreningen Heimdal) from 1954 to 1955 and of the Swedish Union of Conservative Students from 1957 to 1959. He was a Member of Parliament for the Moderate Party from 1971 to 1982 (member of the Committee on Civil-Law Legislation and the Committee on Justice), member of the party board of the Moderate Party from 1972 to 1990 and its working committee from 1975 to 1990. Winberg was a member of the Press Subsidies Board (Presstödsnämnden) from 1971 to 1979 and of the board of the Swedish National Council for Crime Prevention from 1974 to 1979. In 1974, Winberg attended the management course at the Swedish National Defence College and he worked at the Swedish National Police Board from 1977 to 1979 and the Swedish Armed Forces Intelligence Board (Försvarets underrättelsenämnd) from 1978 to 1979. He also worked within the county administrative board of Västernorrland County from 1977 to 1979 and the Nordic Council from 1977 to 1982. Winberg worked in the steering group for the review of legislation on organized and economic crime from 1977 to 1979. He was chairman of Sundsvalls virkesmätningsförening from 1982 to 1995, chairman of the board of the Stadshypotek Västernorrland from 1986 to 1995, of Skogsbrukets Datacentral from 1984, of the Pension Fund of the Swedish Press Council (Pressens Pensionskassa) from 1988 and of Virkesmätningsrådet from 1994. Furthermore, Winberg was a member of the Election Review Board (Valprövningsnämnden) from 1982, member of the Parliamentary Commission following the assassination of Olof Palme from 1987 to 1988, of the commission for further investigation of the investigation into the assassination of Olof Palme from 1994, member of the Swedish Security Service Committee (Säpokommittén) from 1989 to 1990, of the Court Inquiry (Domstolsutredningen) from 1990 to 1992, of the Cabinet Minister's Wages Inquiry (Statsrådslöneutredningen) from 1992 to 1993 and the JAS Commission from 1993 to 1994. He was also a member of the special investigation regarding security issues at Swedish embassies and more in the former Soviet Union from 1992 to 1993 and regarding the reorganization of the Swedish National Police Board in 1993.

Winberg wrote political and legal articles in Svenska Dagbladet, Svensk tidskrift, Medborgaren etc.

== Personal life ==
In 1957, he married lawyer Ulla Greta Winberg (born 1933), the daughter of Johan Pettersson and Astrid (née Jönsson).

== Death ==
Winberg was treated at Mellannorrlands Hospice in Sundsvall and died there on 22 April 2022. The funeral service was held at Gustav Adolf's grave chapel in Sundsvall.

Government offices
Preceded by Sven Romanus	Minister for Justice; 12 October 1979 – 5 May 1981	Succeeded by Carl Axel Petri
Legal offices
Preceded by Karl-Erik Skarvall	President of the Court of Appeal for Southern Norrland; 1982–1998	Succeeded by Barbro Hegrelius-Jonsson
