= Göran Lambertz =

Swedish judge

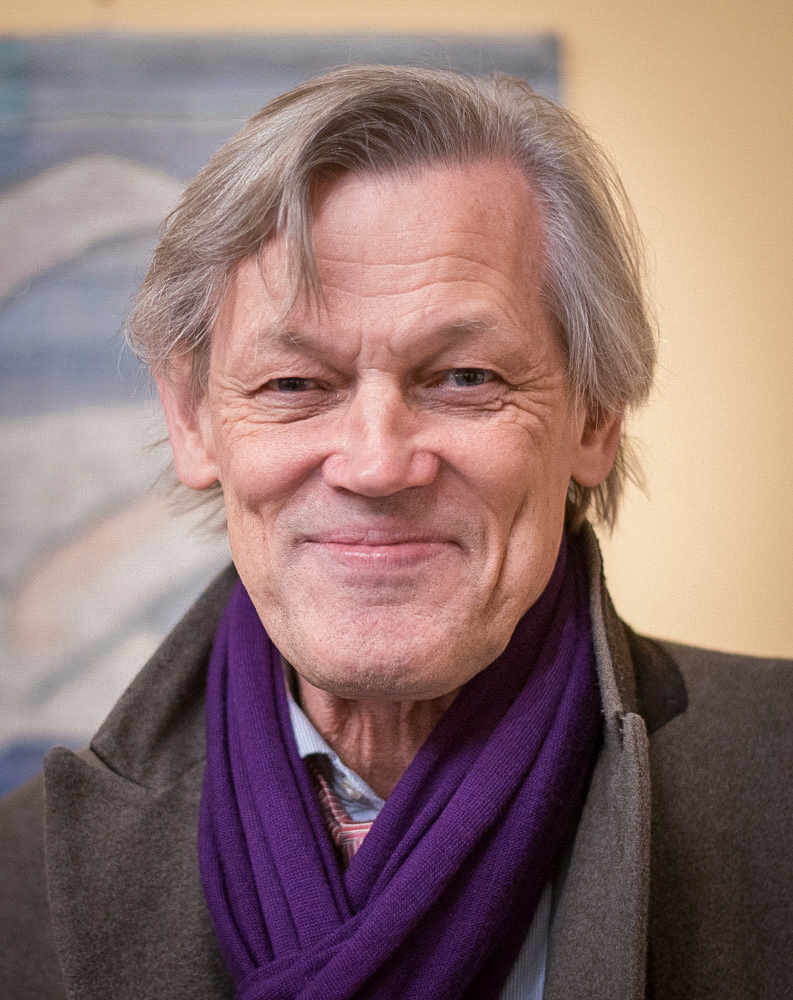
Göran Tomas Lambertz in 2015

Lars Göran Tomas Lambertz (born 17 February 1950) was the Chancellor of Justice (Swedish: justitiekansler) in Sweden between 2001 and 2009. He was serving as a judge on the Supreme Court of Sweden between 2009 and 2017.

== Career ==
Lambertz was born in Kisa in Östergötland County. He received a Candidate of Law (Swedish: juris kandidat) from Uppsala University in 1976. He became an Assessor at the Svea Court of Appeal (Swedish: Svea hovrätt) and was employed at the Swedish Ministry of Justice the same year. In 1994 Lambertz was appointed as deputy director-general (Swedish: departementsråd) and in 1997 as director-general for legal affairs (Swedish: rättschef) at the Ministry of Justice. He was appointed as Chancellor of Justice on 1 October 2001. He stepped down in 2009, becoming a judge in the supreme court instead.

== Issues and controversies ==
Göran Lambertz has received much attention in Swedish media. No chancellor of justice before him has been so well known to the people. This has also resulted in much criticism against him.

He refused to investigate the antisemitic character of the Yassin tapes in the Stockholm Mosque which led to international criticism.

As a supreme court judge, he still defends his 2006 decision not to act in the case of Thomas Quick.

== Personal life ==
Lambertz was married to Susanne Lambertz, who worked as a microbiologist, from 1975 to her death in 2018. The wedding, that was small scale, took place in Paris.

Civic offices
Preceded by Hans Regner	Chancellor of Justice; 2001–2009	Succeeded by Anna Skarhed
