= Carl Axel Petri =

Swedish politician and judge

President of the Göta Court of Appeal
- In office 1987–1996
- Preceded by: Erik Åqvist
- Succeeded by: Lars Åhlén

President of the Administrative Court of Appeal in Jönköping
- In office 1976–1987
- Preceded by: None
- Succeeded by: Jan Francke

Minister for Justice
- In office 5 May 1981 – 8 October 1982
- Monarch: Carl XVI Gustaf
- Prime Minister: Thorbjörn Fälldin
- Preceded by: Håkan Winberg
- Succeeded by: Ove Rainer

Minister for Energy
- In office 6 November 1979 – 22 May 1981
- Monarch: Carl XVI Gustaf
- Prime Minister: Thorbjörn Fälldin
- Preceded by: Carl Tham
- Succeeded by: Ingemar Eliasson

Personal details
- Born: Carl Axel Henrik Petri; 12 August 1929 Ronneby, Sweden
- Died: 3 December 2017 (aged 88) Jönköping, Sweden
- Party: Independent
- Spouse: Brita Petri (m. 1953)
- Profession: Jurist

Carl Axel ("Acke") Henrik Petri (12 August 1929 – 3 December 2017) was a Swedish politician and judge. Petri studied law and assumed the chief judgeship in the Administrative Court of Appeal in Jönköping in 1976, then stepped down to become chief justice on the Göta Court of Appeal in 1987, on which he served until 1996. Petri was a cabinet member under prime minister Thorbjörn Fälldin from 1979 to 1982, leading the Ministry of Energy until 1981, when he was named minister for justice.

== Early life ==
Petri was born on 12 August 1929 at Djupadals House in Ronneby Municipality, Sweden, the son of consul Carl Petri and his wife Maud (née Wrede). Petri grew up in Växjö where he also passed studentexamen. He received a Candidate of Law degree from Lund University in 1953.

== Career ==
Petri did his clerkship from 1953 to 1955 and worked as an extra legal clerk (fiskal) in the Scania and Blekinge Court of Appeal in 1956. He then served in different parliamentary committees in the Riksdag from 1958 to 1961 and worked as an assessor in the Scania and Blekinge Court of Appeal in 1963 and as an insurance judge (försäkringsdomare) in 1964. Petri was lawspeaker in the Administrative Court of Appeal of Stockholm from 1972 to 1976, president of the Administrative Court of Appeal of Jönköping from 1976 to 1987 and minister without portfolio with responsibility for energy issues, among other things from 1979 to 1981. He then served as cabinet minister and minister for justice and head of the Ministry of Justice from 1981 to 1982 and president of Göta Court of Appeal from 1987 to 1996.

Petri was secretary and member of various government inquiries. He was chairman of the Utlänningslagkommittén ("Aliens Law Committee"), Miljöskyddsutredningen ("Environmental Protection Inquiry"), Allmänna advokatbyråkommittén ("General Law Firm Committee"), Sjömanspensionsutredningen ("Seamen's Pension Inquiry"), Kyrkoförfattningsutredningen ("Church Constitution Inquiry"), Data- och offentlighetskommittén ("Data and Publicity Committee"), Skeppslegoutredningen ("Ship Lease Inquiry"), Utredningen om ekonomisk och rätt i kyrkan ("Inquiry into Economic and Legal Rights in the Church"), Fri- och rättighetsutredningen ("Freedom and Rights Inquiry"), Kyrkoberedningen and Miljöbalksutredningen ("Environmental Code Inquiry"). He was a board member of the National Swedish Environment Protection Board from 1971 to 1976, chairman of the Stockholm County Council Legal Aid Board (Rättshjälpsnämnden i Stockholm) from 1974 to 1976, first vice chairman of the Swedish Society of Jurists and Sociologists (Jurist- och Samhällsvetareförbundet) from 1975 to 1977, chairman of Board of Appeal for Legal Assistance (Besvärsnämnden för rättshjälp) from 1988 to 1990, of Stamnätsnämnden from 1987, vice chairman of the board of Svenska kraftnät from 1992, board member of Sparbanken Alfa from 1987 to 1991, chairman of the Alfa Savings Bank Foundation (Sparbanksstiftelsen Alfa) from 1991, and chairman of the Sparbanksstiftelsernas Förvaltnings AB from 1994.

== Personal life and death ==
In 1953, Petri married Brita Thulin (born 1931), the daughter of Walther Thulin and Margareta (née Pettersson).

Petri died on 3 December 2017 in Jönköping. The funeral service took place in Sofia Church in Jönköping on 18 December 2017.

== Honours ==
- Honorary doctor of Jönköping University (2002)

== Bibliography ==
- Petri, Carl Axel (2014). Carl Axels minnen [Carl Axels' memories] (in Swedish). [Stockholm]: Petriska släktstiftelsen. ISBN 9789163774560. SELIBR 17781693.

Government offices
Preceded by Carl Tham	Minister for Energy; 1979–1981	Succeeded by Ingemar Eliasson
Preceded by Håkan Winberg	Minister for Justice; 1981–1982	Succeeded by Ove Rainer
Legal offices
Preceded by None	President of the Administrative Court of Appeal in Jönköping; 1976–1987	Succeeded by Jan Francke
Preceded by Erik Åqvist	President of the Göta Court of Appeal; 1987–1996	Succeeded by Lars Åhlén
