= Chancellor of Justice =

The Chancellor of Justice is a government official found in some northern European countries, broadly responsible for supervising the lawfulness of government actions.

== History ==
In 1713, the Swedish King Charles XII, preoccupied with fighting the Great Northern War, was residing in Bendery and had not set foot in Sweden in over a decade. In order to re-establish the domestic administration, which had fallen into disarray, he instituted the office of His Majesty's Supreme Ombudsman, which soon became the Chancellor of Justice. The office commenced operation on October 23, 1714, and the role of the official was to ensure that judges and public officials acted in accordance with the laws, proficiently discharged their tasks, and if not he could initiate legal proceedings for dereliction of duty. This was the origin of the ombudsman institution in Sweden.

The current name was adopted in 1719, by the Instrument of Government of the same year. The Chancellor acted only on behalf of the royal government. In the Instrument of Government of 1809, a counterpart to act on the behalf of Parliament was instituted as the Parliamentary Ombudsman.

== Duties ==
The duties of the Chancellor of Justice may include to:

- be the Government's counsellor in legal matters;
- be the State's representative in trials and other legal disputes;
- receive complaints and claims for damages made against the State and decide on financial compensation for such damages;
- act as ombudsman in the supervision of the authorities and the civil servants, and to take action in cases of abuse;
- ensure that the limits of the freedom of the press and other media are not transgressed and to act as the only public prosecutor in cases regarding offences against the freedom of the press and other media;
- act as the guardian for the protection of privacy.

== Sweden ==
In Sweden, the Chancellor of Justice (Swedish: Justitiekanslern) is a government official charged with representing the Swedish government in various legal matters as the government's ombudsman. The Chancellor is appointed by the Government of Sweden and serves at the pleasure of the cabinet without belonging to the spoils system, the longest term in office thus far having been 22 years. The present Chancellor of Justice is Thomas Bull, who entered office on March 1 2025.

== Finland ==
The Chancellor of Justice of Finland (Finnish: Oikeuskansleri, Swedish: Justitiekanslern) is a Finnish government official who supervises authorities' (such as cabinet ministers and other public officials) compliance with the law and advances legal protection for Finnish citizens. The Chancellor investigates complaints against authorities' activities and may also start an investigation on his own initiative. The Chancellor attends cabinet meetings as a non-voting member to ensure that legal procedures and regulations are followed. The Chancellor has wide-ranging powers of oversight, investigation and prosecution.

The Chancellor (and Deputy) is appointed by the President of Finland. The Chancellor is appointed for life, but is required to retire at the age of 68, in line with all other Finnish civil servants. The Chancellor of Justice from 2018 will be Tuomas Pöysti, LL.D., replacing Jaakko Jonkka, LL.D.

== Estonia ==
The Estonian Chancellor of Justice (Estonian: Õiguskantsler) is an independent supervisor of the basic principles of the Constitution of Estonia and the protector of individual rights. The institution seeks to ensure that authorities fulfil the obligations deriving from the principles of the rule of law and protection of human and social rights, human dignity, freedom, equality and democracy. The Chancellor of Justice is appointed to office by the Riigikogu (parliament) on the proposal of the President for a seven-year term. The Current Chancellor of Justice is Ülle Madise, who has been in office since 2015.

== See also ==
- Judicial review
