= Lundius =

Lundius is a surname. Notable people with the surname include:

- Carolus Lundius, Swedish professor
- Daniel Lundius, Swedish bishop
- Marianne Lundius (born 1949), Swedish lawyer and judge
