= Johan Munck =

Swedish lawyer (1943–2025)

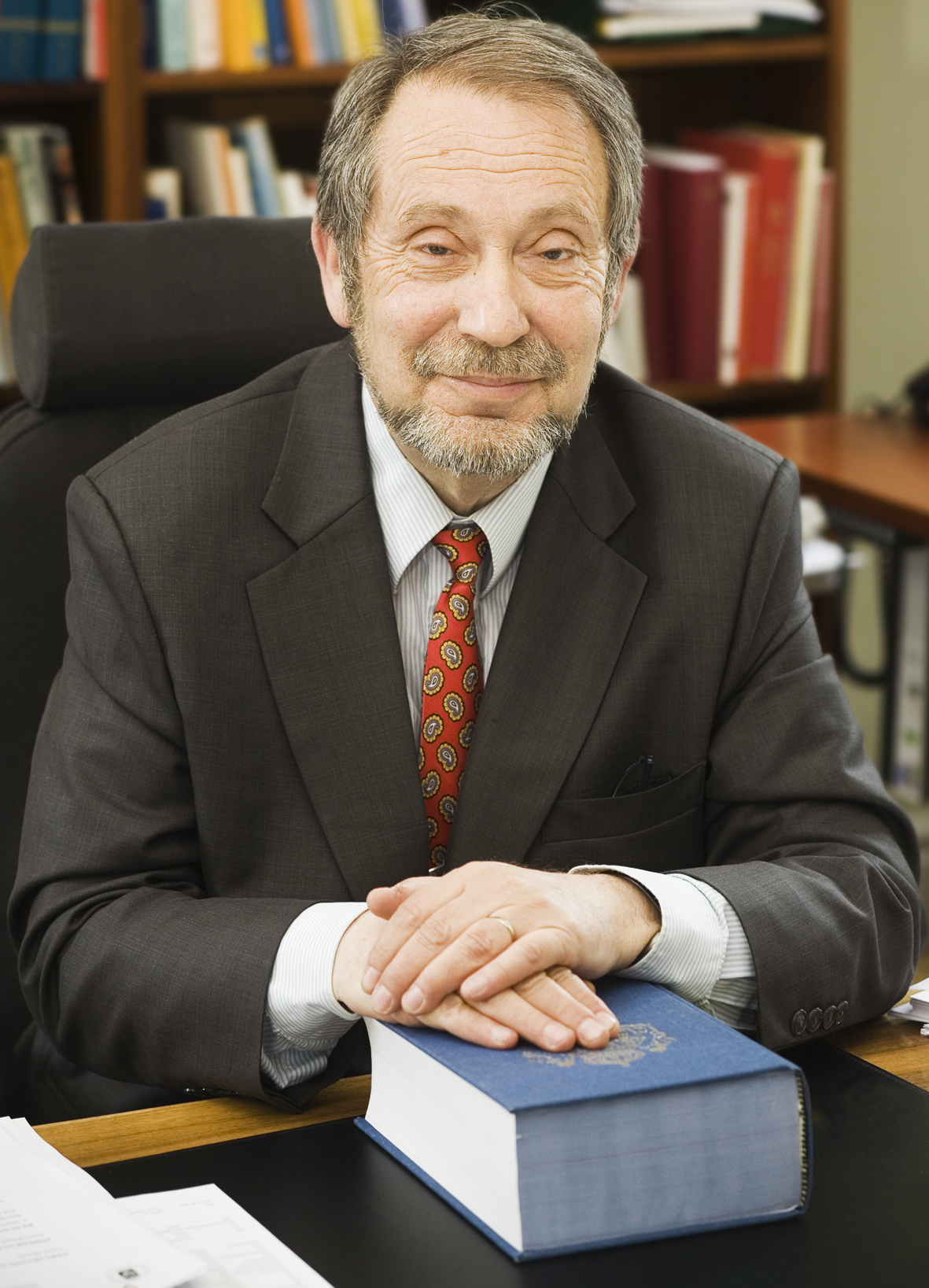

President of the Supreme Court of Sweden
- In office 2007–2010
- Monarch: Carl XVI Gustaf
- Prime Minister: Fredrik Reinfeldt
- Preceded by: Bo Svensson
- Succeeded by: Marianne Lundius

Justice of the Supreme Court of Sweden
- In office 1987–2007

Personal details
- Born: 7 February 1943 Malmö, Sweden
- Died: 17 October 2025 (aged 82)
- Education: Lund University

Johan Munck (7 February 1943 – 17 October 2025) was a Swedish lawyer and former President of the Supreme Court of Sweden (2007–2010). Since 2010, he is the editor of the Swedish code of laws.

== Early life and education ==
Munck was born in Malmö, Skåne County, the adopted son of the lawyer and former mayor of Malmö Thomas Munck af Rosenschöld. He received a Candidate of Law degree from Lund University in 1966.

== Career ==
In 1974 he was employed as an associate judge (hovrättsassessor) at the Skåne and Blekinge Court of Appeal in Malmö. The same year he was employed at the Ministry of Justice where he served as a legal adviser (sakkunnig) until 1979, assistant undersecretary (departementsråd) and head of the criminal law unit (straffrättsenheten) from 1979 to 1983, and as director-general for legal affairs (rättschef) from 1983 to 1987. In 1987 he was appointed Justice of the Supreme Court of Sweden. On 1 February 2007, he was appointed President of the Supreme Court following the retirement of Bo Svensson.

Munck served as a commissioner of several Swedish government commissions and committees, such as the Committee on Genetical Integrity (Kommittén om genetisk integritet), the 11 September Commission (11 september-utredningen) and the Stock Market Security Paper Commission (Värdepappersmarknadsutredningen). He served as chairman of the Swedish Stock Market Committee (Aktiemarknadsnämnden), the Disciplinary Committee of the Stockholm Stock Exchange (Stockholmsbörsens disciplinnämnd), the Swedish Broadcasting Commission (Granskningsnämnden för Radio och TV) and the Swedish National Collections of Music (Statens musiksamlingar). From 1979 to 1988 he was a judicial assistant to the Supreme Commander of the Swedish Armed Forces. He authored several books and articles related to criminal and civil law.

He was married to Kerstin Munck (née Palmquist) and had three children. He lived with his family in Sollentuna north of Stockholm. He was an outspoken Feminist.

Legal offices
Preceded by Bo Svensson	President of the Supreme Court of Sweden; 1 February 2007–2010	Succeeded by Marianne Lundius
