= Carl Petri =

Carl Petri may refer to:

- Carl Adam Petri (1926–2010), German mathematician and computer scientist
- Carl Axel Petri (1929–2017), Swedish politician and judge
