= Swedish Commission on Security and Integrity Protection =

- Säkerhets- och integritetsskyddsnämnden
- The coat of arms of the Swedish Commission on Security and Integrity Protection

Agency overview
- Formed: 2008
- Preceding agency: Registernämnden
- Jurisdiction: Government of Sweden
- Headquarters: Norr Mälarstrand 6, Stockholm; 59°19′37.167″N 18°02′57.8328″E
- Employees: 18 (2014)
- Annual budget: SEK 18 million (2014)
- Agency executive: Sigurd Heuman, Chairman
- Parent agency: Ministry of Justice
- Website: sakint.se

The Swedish Commission on Security and Integrity Protection (Swedish: Säkerhets- och integritetsskyddsnämnden) is a Swedish administrative authority sorting under the Ministry of Justice responsible for supervising law enforcement agencies' use of secret surveillance techniques, assumed identities and other associated activities. The commission also supervise the processing of personal data by the Swedish Police Authority. It is also obliged to check whether someone has been the subject of secret surveillance or subject to the processing of personal data, at the request of an individual, and if it was done within bounds of applicable legislation.

== See also ==
- Swedish Economic Crime Authority
- Swedish Police Authority
- Swedish Security Service
