= Sten Wickbom =

Swedish politician

Governor of Kronoberg County
- In office 1988–1995
- Preceded by: Britt Mogård
- Succeeded by: Wiggo Komstedt

Minister for Justice
- In office 15 November 1983 – 19 October 1987
- Prime Minister: Olof Palme; Ingvar Carlsson
- Preceded by: Ove Rainer
- Succeeded by: Anna-Greta Leijon

Director General of the National Swedish Land Survey Administration
- In office 1974–1983
- Preceded by: Lars Öjborn
- Succeeded by: Jim Widmark

Personal details
- Born: Sten Gustaf Wickbom; 14 March 1931 Stockholm, Sweden
- Died: 26 December 2015 (aged 84) Växjö, Sweden
- Party: Social Democratic Party
- Spouse: Gunnel Persson (m. 1991)

Sten Gustaf Wickbom (14 March 1931 – 26 December 2015) was a Swedish civil servant and member of the Swedish Social Democratic Party. Wickbom served as the minister for justice from 1983 to 1987. He then became the Governor of Kronoberg County from 1988 to 1995.

== Early life ==
Wickbom was born on 14 March 1931 in Stockholm, Sweden, the son of colonel Börje Wickbom and his wife Elsa (née Quiding). He obtained a Candidate of Law degree from Uppsala University in 1954.

== Career ==
=== Early career ===
Wickbom did his clerkship from 1955 and 1957 and worked as an extra legal clerk (fiskal) in Svea Court of Appeal in 1958. He then served as court secretary (tingssekreterare) from 1960 to 1962 and assessor in Svea Court of Appeal in 1964. Wickbom became Hovrättsråd in 1969 and worked as an expert in the Ministry of the Interior in 1964, served as deputy director (kansliråd) in the Ministry of Communications in 1967 and as director-general for legal affairs (rättschef) at the Ministry for Civil Service Affairs from 1969 to 1973 and in the Ministry of Housing in 1974. Wickbom served as Director General of the National Swedish Land Survey Administration from 1974 to 1983.

Wickbom also served as chairman, expert, and secretary in a number of government investigations. He was board member of Liber from 1974 to 1977, of the Swedish Central Board for Real Property Data (Centralnämnden för fastighetsdata) from 1981 to 1983 and of the Geological Survey of Sweden from 1982 to 1983.

=== Minister for Justice and the Berling affair ===
Wickbom, who served minister for justice from 1983 to 1987, oversaw the investigation into the assassination of Prime Minister Olof Palme, which occurred on 28 February 1986, during his tenure. One year later, Wickbom left the government shortly after the escape of Stig Bergling, a former Swedish Security Service convicted of spying for the Soviet Union. It was rumored that Wickbom was forced to resign following Bergling's escape, which Wickbom denied.

=== Later work ===
Wickbom served as Governor of Kronoberg County from 1988 to 1995 and was director general and chairman of the Administrative Policy Commission (Förvaltningspolitiska kommissionen) from 1995 to 1997.

Wickbom was chairman of Dalälvsdelegationen from 1987 to 1994, and of Concerts Sweden (Svenska Rikskonserter) from 1989 to 1996.

== Personal life ==
In 1991, Wickbom married Gunnel Persson (born 1939), the daughter of Axel and Helga Persson.

Wickbom was a native of Växjö. He moved back to Växjö during the 1990s after completing his tenure as Governor of Kronoberg County.

== Death ==
Sten Wickbom died in Växjö on 26 December 2015, at the age of 84. He was survived by his wife, Gunnel Wickbom.

== Honours ==
- Members of the Royal Swedish Academy of War Sciences (1982)

Civic offices
Preceded by Lars Öjborn	Director General of the National Swedish Land Survey Administration; 1974–1983	Succeeded by Jim Widmark
Preceded by Britt Mogård	Governor of Kronoberg County; 1988–1995	Succeeded by Wiggo Komstedt
Government offices
Preceded by Ove Rainer	Minister for Justice; 1983–1987	Succeeded by Anna-Greta Leijon
