= Girjas case =

2020 Supreme Court of Sweden decision

- Court: Supreme Court of Sweden
- Decided: 23 January 2020

The Girjas case is a landmark decision of the Supreme Court of Sweden between the Girjas Sami village _{[sw]} and the Swedish government concerning the right to issue hunting and fishing licenses within the Girjas district. The result was that while the "Swedish Reindeer Husbandry Act" did not grant the village rights to the licenses, the "possession since time immemorial" (in Swedish Urminnes hävd) did grant them the right to the licenses. The concept, according to research, was rarely used to justify the ownership of large plots of land as was the case here. Further, according to 16-17th century legislative usages, due to the abundance of land and minimal number of people, those who took care of the land were considered the de facto owners.

== Judgment ==
On 23 January 2020 the Supreme Court delivered its verdict. The Court's 92-page verdict is long by Swedish standards.

== Other issues ==
The use of the word "Lapp" by Swedish government lawyers was criticised as some Sámi consider the term offensive.

== Bibliography ==
- Ravna, Øyvind (2020). "A Sámi Community Wins Case against the Swedish State in the Supreme Court". Arctic Review on Law and Politics. 11: 19–21. doi:10.23865/arctic.v11.2173.
- Allard, Christina; Brännström, Malin (March 2021). "Girjas Reindeer Herding Community v. Sweden: Analysing the Merits of the Girjas Case". Arctic Review on Law and Politics. 12: 56–79. doi:10.23865/arctic.v12.2678. This article incorporates text from this source, which is available under the CC BY 4.0 license.
- Ruin, Påhl (April 21, 2021). "Girjas Sami Village vs. the Swedish State: Breakthrough for Indigenous People". Baltic Worlds. 1 (2). Södertörn University: 4–11.
- Brännström, Malin (2020). "The Girjas Case – court proceedings as a strategy to enforce Sámi land rights". In Koivurova, Timo; Broderstad, Else Grete; Cambou, Dorothée; Dorough, Dalee; Stammler, Florian (eds.). Routledge Handbook of Indigenous Peoples in the Arctic (1st ed.). Routledge. doi:10.4324/9780429270451. ISBN 978-0-429-27045-1. S2CID 228860378.
- Östlund, Lars; Bergman, Ingela; Sandström, Camilla; Brännström, Malin (2020). "The Legal Application of Ethnoecology:The Girjas Sami Village versus the Swedish State". Plants, People, and Places: The Roles of Ethnobotany and Ethnoecology in Indigenous Peoples' Land Rights in Canada and Beyond. McGill–Queen's University Press. pp. 188–202. doi:10.2307/j.ctv153k6x6.19. ISBN 978-0-228-00317-5. S2CID 225205835.
