= Carl Tham =

Swedish politician

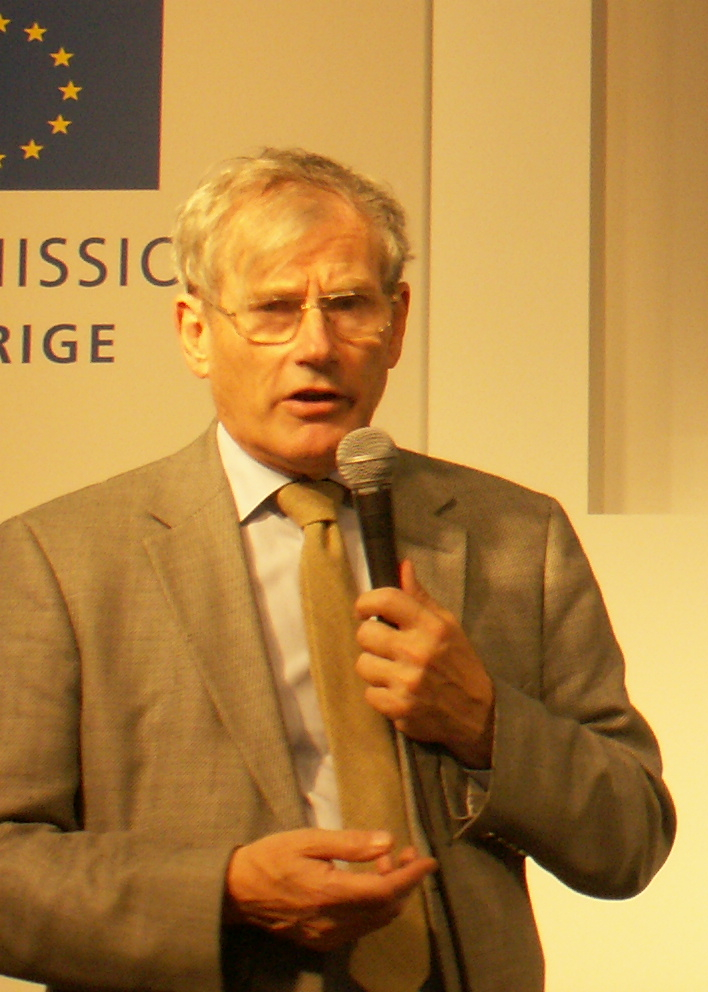

Ambassador of Sweden to Germany
- In office 2002–2006

Minister for Education
- In office 1994–1998

Director-general of the International Development Cooperation Agency
- In office 1985–1994

Director-general of the State Energy Agency
- In office 1983–1985

Minister for Energy
- In office 1978–1979

Personal details
- Born: 5 July 1939 (age 86)
- Party: Social Democratic Party (since 1986)
- Other political affiliations: Liberal People's Party (until 1986)

Carl Gustav Wilhelm Tham (born 5 July 1939) is a Swedish politician. Until 1984, he was a member of the Liberal People's Party, and since 1986, he is a Swedish Social Democratic Party.

He was party secretary in the Liberal People's Party from 1969 to 1978. He was minister for energy from 1978 to 1979 and Member of Parliament in 1976 and from 1979 to 1980. Then he became director-general of the State Energy Agency (Statens energiverk), a position he held from 1983 to 1985 and of the Swedish International Development Cooperation Agency from 1985 to 1994. He became minister for education in 1994 and served in that capacity until 1998. Between 2002 and 2006, he was the Swedish ambassador in Berlin. Tham is the only person in modern times who has served in a centre/centre-right government as well as a Social Democratic Government.

Government offices
Preceded by Olof Johansson	Minister for Energy; 1978–1979	Succeeded by Carl Axel Petri
Preceded by Per Unckel	Minister for Education; 1994–1998	Succeeded by Thomas Östros
Diplomatic posts
Preceded by Mats Hellström	Ambassador of Sweden to Germany; 2002–2006	Succeeded by Ruth Jacoby
