= Seraphim Medal =

Seraphim Medal Serafimermedaljen
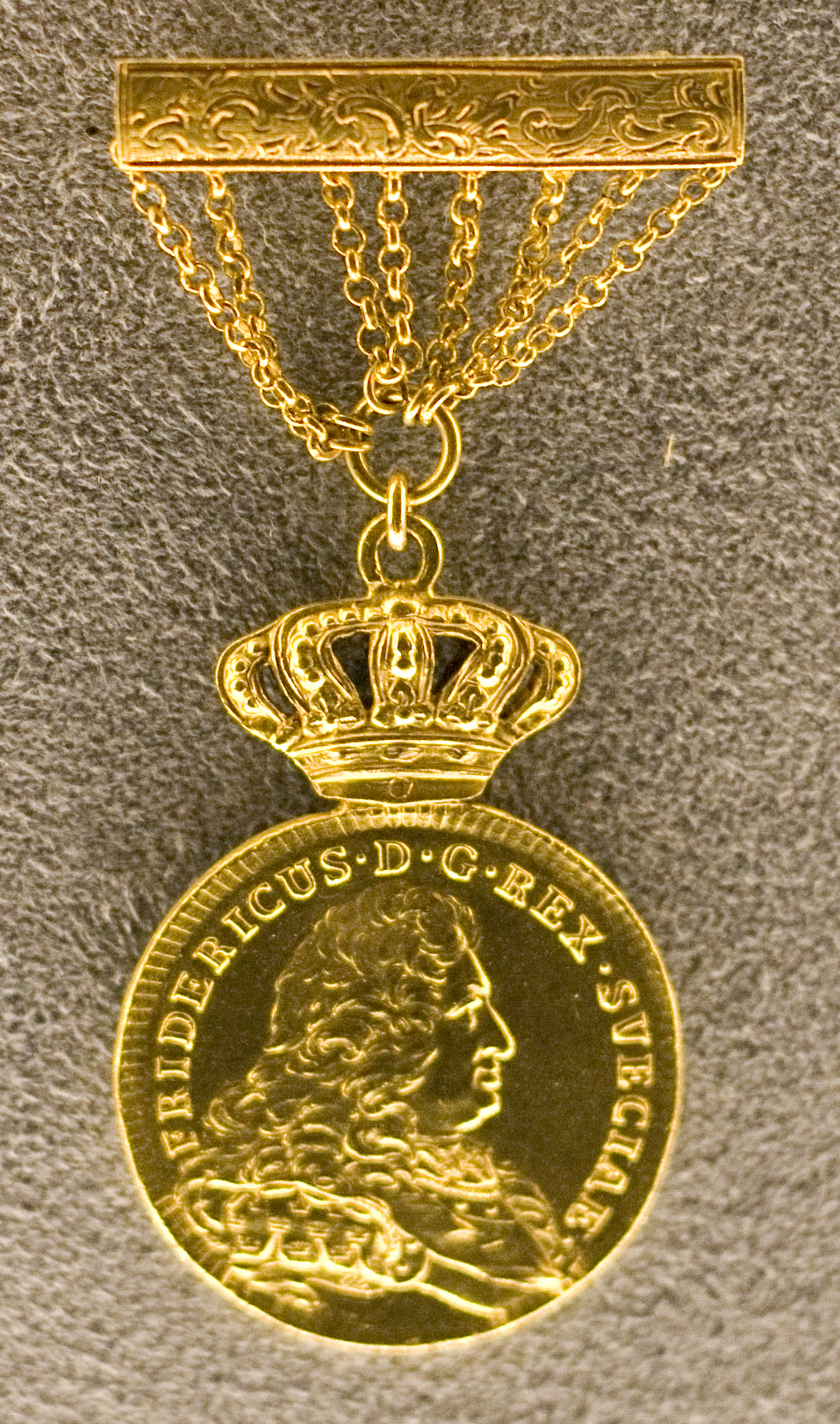
- Obverse of the Seraphim Medal
- Type: Medal of a royal order
- Awarded for: Outstanding services of a humanitarian nature or of general benefit to society
- Description: Front shows Frederick I of Sweden and the inscription ”FREDERICUS D. G. REX SUECIAE” (Frederick by the Grace of God King of the Swedes, the Goths and the Wends). The back shows the Collar of the Order of the Seraphim with the inscription ”ORDO EQ. SERAPHIN. RESTAURATUS NATALI REGIS LXXIII” (The Knightly Order of the Seraphim. Reestablished in the Kings 73rd year.). Around the collar one can see the motto of the medal: ”PROCERES CUM PRINCIPE NECTIT”, and below the year 1748. The medal is worn suspended in golden links.
- Country: Sweden
- Presented by: the King of Sweden
- Motto: ”Proceres cum principe nectit”
- Status: Active
- Established: 1748
- First award: 1748, Olof Ström
- Final award: January 28, 2019; Hédi Fried
- Website: https://kungligmajestatsorden.se/medaljer/serafimermedaljen

Precedence
- Next (lower): H. M. The King's Medal 8th and 5th size
- Related: Order of the Seraphim

The Seraphim Medal (Swedish: Serafimermedaljen) is a royal medal of Sweden. Established in 1748, it is awarded by the King of Sweden for service that benefits society or service of a humanitarian nature.

== Appearance ==
The Seraphim Medal is a gold medal of the 8th size. The obverse of the medal bears the effigy of King Frederick I with the inscription above FREDERICUS D.G. REX SUECIAE. The reverse of the medal bears these words in the centre: ORDO EQ SERAPHIN · RESTAURATUS NATALI REGIS LXXIII · (Order of the Seraphim restored on the seventy-third birthday of the King). Surrounding all of this is the collar of the Order of the Seraphim. Circumscribing the collar is the inscription PROCERES CUM REGE NECTIT 1748 (It unites the Foremost with the Prince).

== Recipients ==
Since 1973, the medal has only been awarded to the following sixteen people:

- Britta Holmström, 1973
- Jacob Wallenberg, 1975
- Sven Romanus, 1980
- Gösta Wallin, 1980
- Sven Edling, 1984
- Olof Rydbeck, 1987
- Henry Montgomery, 1998
- Carl Axel Petri, 1998
- Peter Wallenberg, 2000
- Carl-Gustaf Andrén, 2002
- Hans Blix, 2004
- Sture Linnér, 2008
- Herbert Blomstedt, 2012
- Stig Strömholm, 2012
- Hédi Fried, 2019
- Queen Silvia, 2026
