= Pressombudsmannen =

Position in Swedish Print media

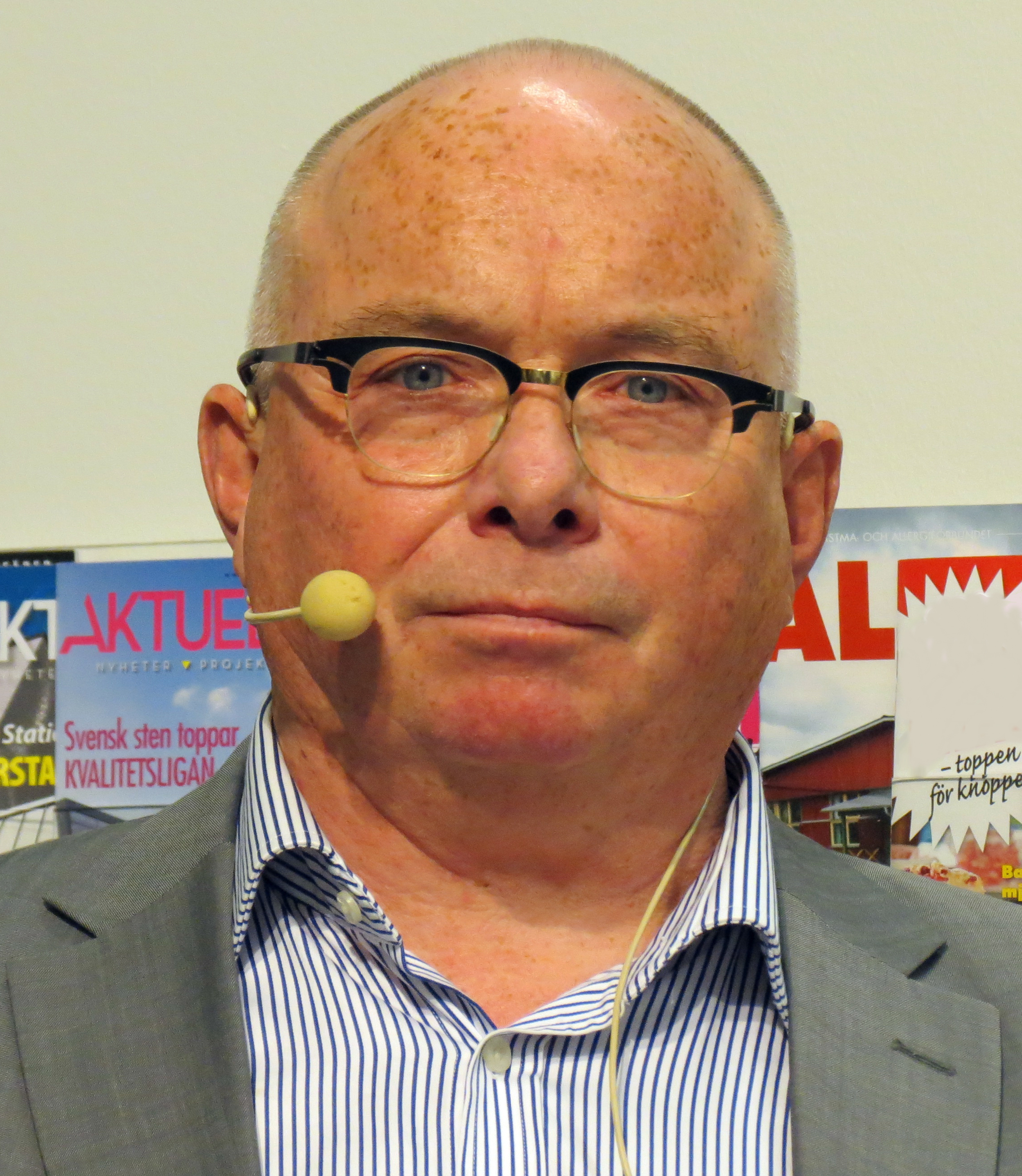
Press Ombudsman Ola Sigvardsson at the Book and Library Fair in Gothenburg 2014.

Pressombudsmannen (or press Ombudsman) is a person whose role in the Swedish print media is to determine whether the actions of a newspaper is in line with good journalistic practice. Complaints regarding the practices of print media can be reported by the general public to the Pressombudsmannen who determines whether a complaint should be brought before the Swedish Press Council (SPC). The SPC can issue fines of up to SEK 2,000 and publish a rejecting opinion.

The charter of the PON, the standing instructions of the Press Ombudsman, and funding for both is the responsibility of the Press's Cooperation Committee (Pressens Samarbetsnämnd). The Press's Cooperation Committee is composed of the Swedish Media Publisher's Association (Tidningsutgivarna or TU), the Sveriges Tidskrifter (ST), the Swedish Union of Journalists (Svenska Journalistförbundet or SJF), and the Swedish Publicists' Association (Publicistklubben).
