= Torkel Gregow =

President of the Supreme Court of Sweden
- In office 1998–2002
- Monarch: Carl XVI Gustaf
- Prime Minister: Göran Persson
- Preceded by: Anders Knutson
- Succeeded by: Bo Svensson

Justice of the Supreme Court of Sweden
- In office 1981–1998

Personal details
- Born: 15 November 1935 Trelleborg, Sweden
- Died: 6 February 2025 (aged 89)
- Education: Lund University

Per Johan Torkel Gregow (15 November 1935 – 6 February 2025) was a Swedish lawyer. Between 1981 and 1998 he served as a Justice of the Supreme Court. In 1998, he was appointed President of the Supreme Court, a role he kept until 2002.

Torkel graduated in law at Lund University in 1958 and did service as a law clerk at District Court between 1959 and 1962. He then served as a public prosecutor from 1963 to 1968 when he became a deputy judge. In 1975 he became a judge in a court of appeal. Torkel was appointed a Justice of the Supreme Court in 1981 and later made its president in 1998, a post he kept until 2002. After retirements from active legal practice he became editor of the Swedish code of laws in 2003 until he retired in 2010.
