= Stefan Lindskog =

Swedish lawyer

Börje Stefan Lindskog (born 29 June 1951) is a Swedish lawyer. He was appointed Justice of the Supreme Court in 2008. From 2016 until his retirement in 2018, he served as President of the Supreme Court.

Born in Norum in Bohuslän, Stefan Lindskog graduated with a bachelor of law degree from Lund University in 1974 and served as law clerk at a district court in 1974–1976. In 1977, he was employed at Wistrand law firm and became an advokat in 1980. Lindskog became a doctor of law at Stockholm University in 1985, docent of private law at Stockholm University in 1987, and was appointed associate professor of insolvency law at University of Gothenburg in 1989. He chaired the Swedish Bar Association in 2004–2007.

On 18 October 2007 the Cabinet appointed Lindskog Justice of the Supreme Court. He took office on 1 January 2008. He was appointed Chair of one of the Supreme Court's divisions in 2011 and President of the Supreme Court in May 2016. Stefan Lindskog retired on 31 August 2018.

Legal offices
Preceded by Axel Calissendorff	Chairman of the Swedish Bar Association; 2004–2007	Succeeded by Tomas Nilsson
Preceded by Marianne Lundius	President of the Supreme Court of Sweden; 2016–2018	Succeeded by Anders Eka
