= Thomas Bull (judge) =

Thomas Bull is a Swedish jurist who serves as the Chancellor of Justice (Swedish: justitiekansler) in Sweden since 1 March 2025. He served as a judge on the Supreme Administrative Court of Sweden from 2013 to 2025, and worked as a professor in constitutional law at Uppsala University from 2008 to 2012.

== Legal career ==
Bull received his Master of Laws degree in 1992, his Doctor of Laws degree in 1997, and his Associate Professorship in Public Law in 2000. He was a professor in constitutional law at Uppsala University from 2008 to 2012. He was nominated as a Justice of the Supreme Administrative Court in 2012, being sworn in on 1 January 2013. On 21 November 2024 he was nominated by the government to be the next Chancellor of Justice, succeeding Mari Heidenborg on 1 March 2025 and retiring from the Supreme Administrative Court.

Bull has also been an expert in the constitutional inquiry's expert group for norm control, in the detention inquiry, the freedom of expression committee, and has been a special investigator of the Swedish Transport Agency's procurement of IT operations.

Civic offices
Preceded by Mari Heidenborg	Chancellor of Justice; 2025–present	Succeeded by Incumbent
