= Marianne Lundius =

Swedish lawyer and judge (born 1949)

President of the Supreme Court of Sweden
- In office 2010–2016
- Monarch: Carl XVI Gustaf
- Prime Minister: Fredrik Reinfeldt; Stefan Löfven
- Preceded by: Johan Munck
- Succeeded by: Stefan Lindskog

Justice of the Supreme Court of Sweden
- In office 1998–2010

Personal details
- Born: 28 April 1949 (age 76)
- Education: Lund University

Eva Marianne Gernandt Lundius (born 28 April 1949) is a Swedish lawyer and judge, who served as Chairwoman of the Supreme Court of Sweden from 2010 to 2016. She was appointed Justice of the Supreme Court in 1998 and was the first female President of the Supreme Court of Sweden.

== Biography ==
Lundius comes from a family of lawyers; both her mother and grandmother worked in the legal profession, making her third-generation lawyer on her mother's side. She graduated from Lund University with a Candidate of Law degree in 1976 and served as a district court clerk for two years after graduating. In 1978 she joined the Lagerlöf och Leman law firm and worked there for 20 years, mainly on tax law and business law cases, before being appointed Justice of the Supreme Court of Sweden in 1998. In 2010 she succeeded Johan Munck as President of the Supreme Court.

She is married to Johan Gernandt, lawyer and Moderate Party politician.

Legal offices
Preceded by Johan Munck	President of the Supreme Court of Sweden; 2010–2016	Succeeded by Stefan Lindskog
