= Parliamentary Ombudsman =

Government official for handling complaints

Parliamentary Ombudsman (Swedish: Riksdagens ombudsman, Finnish: Eduskunnan oikeusasiamies, Icelandic: Umboðsmaður Alþingis, Danish: Folketingets Ombudsmand, Norwegian: Sivilombudet) is the name of the principal ombudsman institutions in the Nordic countries of Sweden (where the term justice ombudsman – Justitieombudsmannen or JO – is also used), Finland, Iceland, Denmark and Norway. In each case, the terms refer both to the office of the parliamentary ombudsman and to an individual ombudsman.

== Sweden ==
The Riksdag has had an ombudsman institution since 1809. At that time Sweden was ruled by the king and therefore the Riksdag of the Estates, which then represented the Four Estates, considered that some institution that was independent of the executive was needed in order to ensure that laws and statutes were observed. For this reason it appointed a parliamentary ombudsman and still continues to do so. The first ombudsman was appointed in 1810, and the parliamentary ombudsmen still follow the basic principles that have applied since then.

=== Jurisdiction ===
A complaint to the JO (Justitieombudsmannen) – or parliamentary ombudsman (Riksdagens ombudsmän), which is the official name of the institution – can be made by anybody who feels that an individual has been treated wrongly or unjustly by a public authority or an official employed by the civil service or local government. A person need not be a Swedish citizen or have reached a certain age to be able to lodge a complaint.

However, the institution has no jurisdiction over the actions of members of the Riksdag, the Government or individual cabinet ministers, the Chancellor of Justice or members of county or municipal councils. Nor do newspapers, radio and television broadcasts, trade unions, banks, insurance companies, doctors in private practice, lawyers et al. come within the ambit of the ombudsmen. Other supervisory agencies exist for these areas, such as the Swedish Press Council (Pressens opinionsnämnd), the Financial Supervisory Authority (Finansinspektionen), the National Board of Health and Welfare (Socialstyrelsen) and the Swedish Bar Association (Sveriges advokatsamfund).

An ombudsman is an individual elected by the Riksdag to ensure that courts of law and other agencies as well as the public officials they employ (and also anyone else whose work involves the exercise of public authority) comply with laws and statutes and fulfil their obligations in all other respects. An ombudsman is elected for a four-year period and can be re-elected. Although there is no formal requirement for an ombudsman to be a jurist, in practice all but the first have had legal training.

In 1941 the stipulation that only men could be elected as ombudsmen was rescinded; since then, five women have been elected to the office. Today there are four ombudsmen, two women and two men. Each ombudsman has her or his own area of responsibility (supervisory area). One of the ombudsmen has the title of chief parliamentary ombudsman and is responsible for administration, deciding, for instance, which areas of responsibility are to be allocated to the other ombudsmen. However, the ombudsman cannot intervene in another ombudsman's inquiry or adjudication in any case within their ambit. Each ombudsman has a direct individual responsibility to the Riksdag for their actions. The Annual Report—which is one of the official publications of the Swedish Riksdag—is submitted to the Standing Committee on the Constitution, which then draws up its own written report and notifies the Riksdag.

The ombudsmen's inquiries (supervision) are based on complaints from the general public, cases initiated by the ombudsmen themselves and on observations made during the course of inspections. Every year the parliamentary ombudsmen receive almost 5,000 complaints – of widely varying kinds. Most of the ombudsmen's work consists of dealing with complaints.

=== Powers and sanctions ===
The parliamentary ombudsmen have the right to initiate disciplinary procedures against an official for misdemeanours. The most frequent outcome is, however, a critical advisory comment from an ombudsman or some form of recommendation. An ombudsman's opinion is never legally binding. The office of the parliamentary ombudsman is politically neutral.

The most extreme recourse allows an ombudsman to act as a special prosecutor and bring charges against the official for malfeasance or some other irregularity. This very rarely happens, but the mere awareness of this possibility means a great deal for the ombudsmen's authority.

=== History ===
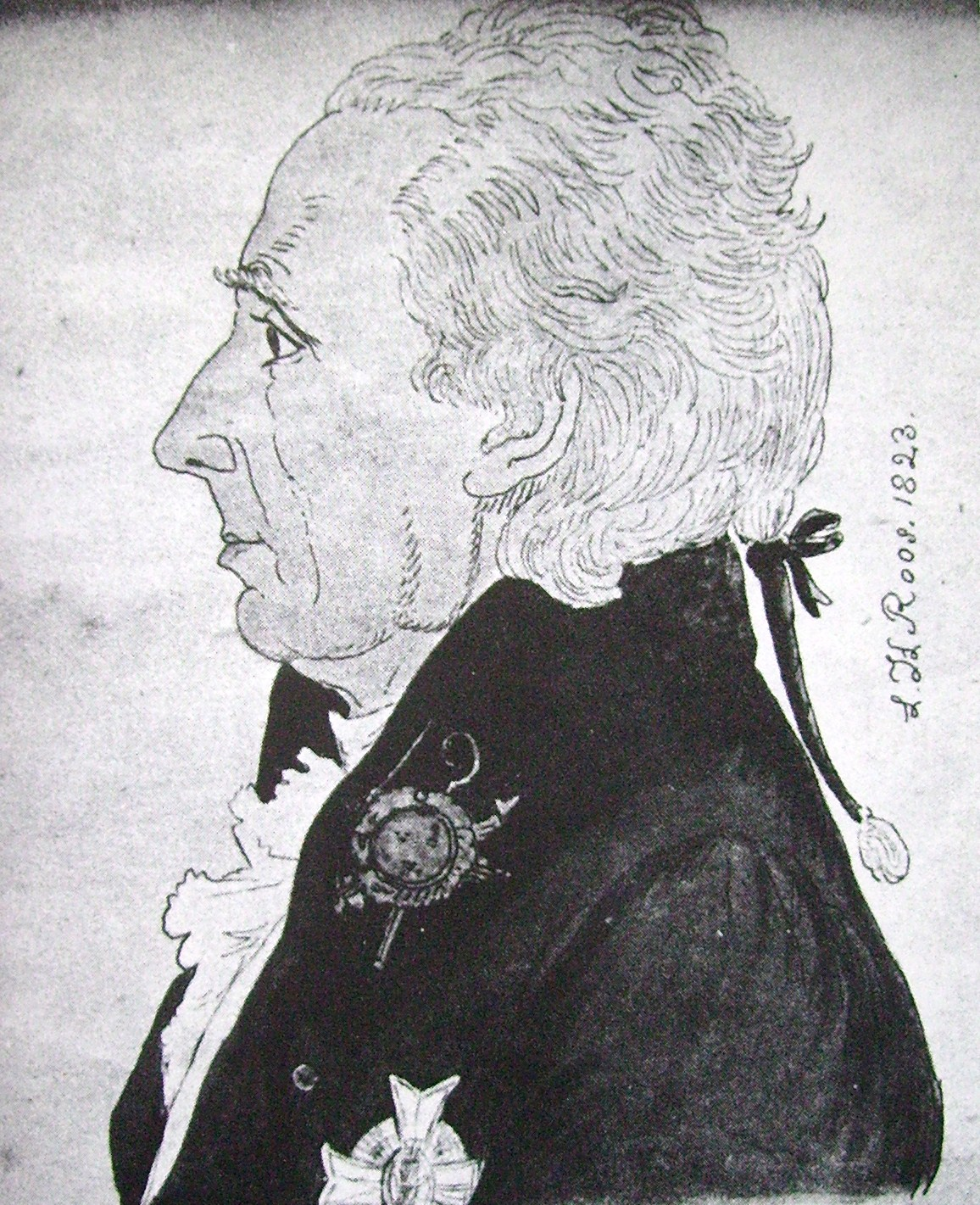
Lars Augustin Mannerheim (1749-1835) was the first Swedish justitieombudsman.

The office of the parliamentary ombudsman was established in connection with the adoption of the Swedish Instrument of Government that came into effect after the deposition of the Swedish king in 1809 and which was based to some extent on Montesquieu's ideas about the division of powers. With the autocratic rule of King Gustav III fresh in mind, the legislators introduced into the new constitution a system that would allow the Riksdag some control over the exercise of executive power. The Standing Committee on the Constitution was therefore charged with the task of supervising the actions of ministers and with ensuring the election of a special parliamentary ombudsman to monitor the compliance of public authorities with the law. The Riksdag Act of 1810 contained provisions concerning the auditors elected by the Riksdag to scrutinise the doings of the civil service, the Bank of Sweden and the Swedish National Debt Office. The regulations in Chapter 12 of the Instrument of Government of 1974 later incorporated these three supervisory Riksdag agencies (i.e. the parliamentary ombudsmen, the Standing Committee on the Constitution and the parliamentary auditors) into the current system of parliamentary government.

The idea of creating some organ answerable to the Riksdag that could monitor the way in which the authorities complied with the law was not a new one in 1809. In fact, in 1713 the absolute monarch Charles XII had created the office of His Majesty's Supreme Ombudsman. At that time King Charles XII was in Turkey and had been abroad for almost 13 years. In his absence his administration in Sweden had fallen into disarray. He therefore established the supreme ombudsman to be his pre-eminent representative in Sweden. The task entrusted to him was to ensure that judges and public official in general acted in accordance with the laws in force and discharged their duties satisfactorily in other respects. If the ombudsman found that this was not the case, he was empowered to initiate legal proceedings against them for dereliction of their duties. In 1719 the supreme ombudsman was given the title of chancellor of justice (Justitiekanslern). This office still exists, and today the Chancellor of Justice acts as the government's Ombudsman. After the death of Charles XII in 1718 Sweden enjoyed decades of what was more or less parliamentary rule (the Age of Liberty). In 1766 the Riksdag actually for the first time elected the chancellor of justice. In the 1772 Instrument of Government, however, the right to appoint the chancellor of justice again became a royal prerogative. After a period of renewed autocratic rule under Gustaf III and his son, Gustaf Adolf IV, the latter was deposed in 1809.

According to the 1809 Instrument of Government, power was to be divided between the king and the Riksdag. The king was to appoint the chancellor of justice (in other words, he was the royal ombudsman) and the Riksdag was to appoint its own parliamentary ombudsman. The main purpose of the establishment of this new post as ombudsman (parliamentary ombudsman) was to safeguard the rights of citizens by establishing a supervisory agency that was completely independent of the executive. However, it seemed quite natural to model this new office on that of the chancellor of justice. Like the chancellor of justice, therefore, the ombudsman was to be a prosecutor whose task was to supervise the application of the laws by judges and civil servants. In the words of the 1809 Instrument of Government, the Riksdag was to appoint a man "known for his knowledge of the law and exemplary probity" as parliamentary ombudsman. In other words, his duties were to focus on protection of the rights of citizens. For instance the parliamentary ombudsman was to encourage uniform application of the law and indicate legislative obscurities. His work was to take the form of inspections and inquiries into complaints. Complaints played a relatively insignificant role to begin with. During the first century of the existence of the office, the total number of complaints amounted to around 8,000.

Initially, the role of a parliamentary ombudsman could be characterised as that of a prosecutor. Cases set in motion by the ombudsman were either shelved with no action being taken or resulted in prosecution. Eventually, however, routines evolved which meant that prosecution was waived for minor transgressions and an admonition was issued instead. This development was acknowledged by the Riksdag in 1915 by its inclusion of a specific right to waive prosecution in the instructions for the parliamentary ombudsman. Until the adoption of the 1975 instructions, these provisions on an ombudsman's right to waive prosecution in cases involving transgressions that were not of major consequence provided the only formal basis for the expression of criticism. In the cases where an official could not be charged with any punishable error and therefore there were no grounds for a decision to waive prosecution, the expression of criticism or advice on the part of the ombudsman was based only the usages that had evolved over the years. These practices were appraised and approved by the Riksdag in 1964.

The decision in 1975 to abolish the special right to waive prosecution was linked to the simultaneous reform of official accountability, which involved among other things major curtailment of the legal responsibility of public officials for their actions. In this context it was considered that there was no longer any need for the parliamentary ombudsmen to have the right to waive prosecution. Instead it was stipulated that in inquiries into cases the ombudsmen were to be subject to the regulations that already applied to public prosecutors with regard to prosecution and the right to waive prosecution. Today, the 1986 instructions – the Act with Instructions for the Parliamentary Ombudsmen (1986:765) and the amendments added in 1989 – state that when undertaking the role of prosecutor, the ombudsmen are also to comply with the other statutory regulations applying to public prosecutors. (In addition, the 1975 instructions also included a special regulation empowering the ombudsmen to make critical or advisory comments and these have been transferred to the instructions that now apply.)

In 1957 the institution of the parliamentary ombudsman was also given the power to monitor local government authorities.

=== Legacy ===
The development of the role of the ombudsman institution has resulted in a gradual shift in the thrust of these activities from a punitive to an advisory and consultative function. The task of forestalling error and general endeavours to ensure the correct application of the law have taken precedence over the role of prosecutor.

The starting point of the work of the parliamentary ombudsmen today is based – as it was nearly two centuries ago – on the desire of individuals that any treatment they receive from the authorities should be lawful and correct in every other respect. The institution of the parliamentary ombudsmen today is a vital element in the constitutional protection of the fundamental rights and freedoms of each individual.

The supervision exercised by the parliamentary ombudsmen consists mainly of inquiries into complaints submitted by the general public. In addition the four ombudsmen make inspections and any other investigations they consider necessary. The ombudsmen are, however – unlike normal official agencies – never obliged to consider the circumstances of every case submitted to them. Instead the ombudsmen make their own assessment of which complaints to investigate and which require no further action. This presupposes, however, an ungrudging attitude on the part of the ombudsmen to the complaints they receive so that all those that give grounds for suspecting that some error has been committed will be investigated. It can also happen that even though an ombudsman finds no reason to inquire into a complaint itself, other aspects of the actions of a public authority will be appraised instead.

As was the case in 1810 – when Lars Augustin Mannerheim was appointed as the first ombudsman – the four parliamentary ombudsmen are today completely independent of the government and the civil service which they monitor. For this reason the Institution is often said to be of an extraordinary nature. This means, for instance, that the activities of the ombudsmen are not intended to replace the supervision and application of the law that devolves on other organisations in the community.

Even though from a constitutional point of view monitoring the application of law by public authorities is the prerogative of the Riksdag, for reasons of principle it has been considered unacceptable to incorporate any political considerations into this supervision. For this reason the independent attitude adopted by the parliamentary ombudsmen has applied to their relationship with the Riksdag as well. For instance, the Riksdag is not considered able to issue directives to the ombudsmen about any individual case, nor can it express opinions retrospectively about how a case was dealt with or the final adjudication. Instead the authority of the Riksdag over the activities of the ombudsmen finds expression in the instructions issued to the parliamentary ombudsmen and in the funds allocated to the office. It is the Riksdag that decides on the budget for the parliamentary ombudsmen – not the government or the Ministry of Finance.

== Finland ==
Finland has had the institution of parliamentary ombudsman (Finnish: eduskunnan oikeusasiamies, Swedish: riksdagens justitieombudsman) since 1920. The office of the ombudsman has one ombudsman and two assistant ombudsmen (Finnish: apulaisoikeusasiamies, Swedish: biträdande justitieombudsman). The officials are elected for a term of four years and their duties closely resemble the jurisdiction of their Swedish counterparts. The other Finnish official charged with the supervision of public power is the Chancellor of Justice. The jurisdiction of the two offices overlaps, but the parliamentary ombudsman is the authority specially charged with the handling of complaints by military servicemen, conscripts, prisoners and other persons in closed institutions. He also regularly inspects prisons, garrisons and Finnish peacekeeping missions abroad. The other special duty of the parliamentary ombudsman is the supervision of police undercover and wiretapping activities.

== Norway ==
The Norwegian Parliamentary Ombud has existed since 1962.

== Denmark ==
The Danish parliamentary ombudsman has existed since 1955. It investigates complaints against public authorities and can also take up cases on its own initiative.

== Iceland ==
The Icelandic parliamentary ombudsman was established in 1987. It oversees the actions of state and local authorities.

== See also ==
- Ombudsman
- European Ombudsman (EU)
- Parliamentary and Health Service Ombudsman (UK)
- Lokayukta
