= Djupadals House =

- Location within Blekinge

General information
- Location: Blekinge, Sweden
- Coordinates: 56°13′57″N 15°16′28″E

Djupadal Manor (Swedish: Djupadals herrgård) is a manor house located in Ronneby Municipality in Blekinge, Sweden. It is probably built in the early 17th century. From 1838, Djupadal belonged to Casper Wrede af Elimä (1808–1877). From the early 1900s, the Petri family became part owners.
