= Swedish Economic Crime Authority =

- Ekobrottsmyndigheten
- The coat of arms of the Swedish Economic Crime Authority

Agency overview
- Formed: 1998
- Jurisdiction: Government of Sweden
- Headquarters: Hantverkargatan 15; 112 21 Stockholm
- Employees: 700
- Annual budget: SEK 856M (2022)
- Minister responsible: Gunnar Strömmer, (Ministry of Justice)
- Agency executive: Rikard Jermsten
- Parent agency: Ministry of Justice
- Key document: Regleringsbrev
- Website: ekobrottsmyndigheten.se

The Swedish Economic Crime Authority (Swedish: Ekobrottsmyndigheten, abbreviated EBM or SECA) is a Swedish government agency organized under the Ministry of Justice, with the mandate to investigate and prosecute financial crimes, like dishonesty to creditors, bookkeeping crime, financial market abuse, money laundering, tax fraud and EU fraud. SECA is also tasked to monitor and analyse economic crime trends, initiate joint action between authorities and propose legislative changes designed curb economic crime. SECA primarily focusses on serious economic crime, with a special emphasis on investigating crime in the financial market and recovering the proceeds of crime.

== History ==
Ekobrottsmyndigheten, EBM or SECA, was set up in 1998, to safeguard the expertise of experienced police officers and prosecutors, who often got assigned to other types of investigations not related to economic crime. The authority was the first in Sweden to co-house police officers and prosecutors under the same roof.

== Organizational structure ==
SECA has national jurisdiction and operates nationally, with a headquarters in Stockholm and approximately 700 employees. There are about 100 prosecutors and 230 police officers as well as different specialists such as analysts, forensic accountants and administrative staff. SECA is led by Director-General Rikard Jermsten. SECA's operational units consist of 11 local public prosecution offices that investigate and prosecute financial crimes and five operational police units with specialist functions such as surveillance teams and criminal intelligence units.

== See also ==
- Crime in Sweden
