= Karl Petrén =

Swedish physician (1868–1927)

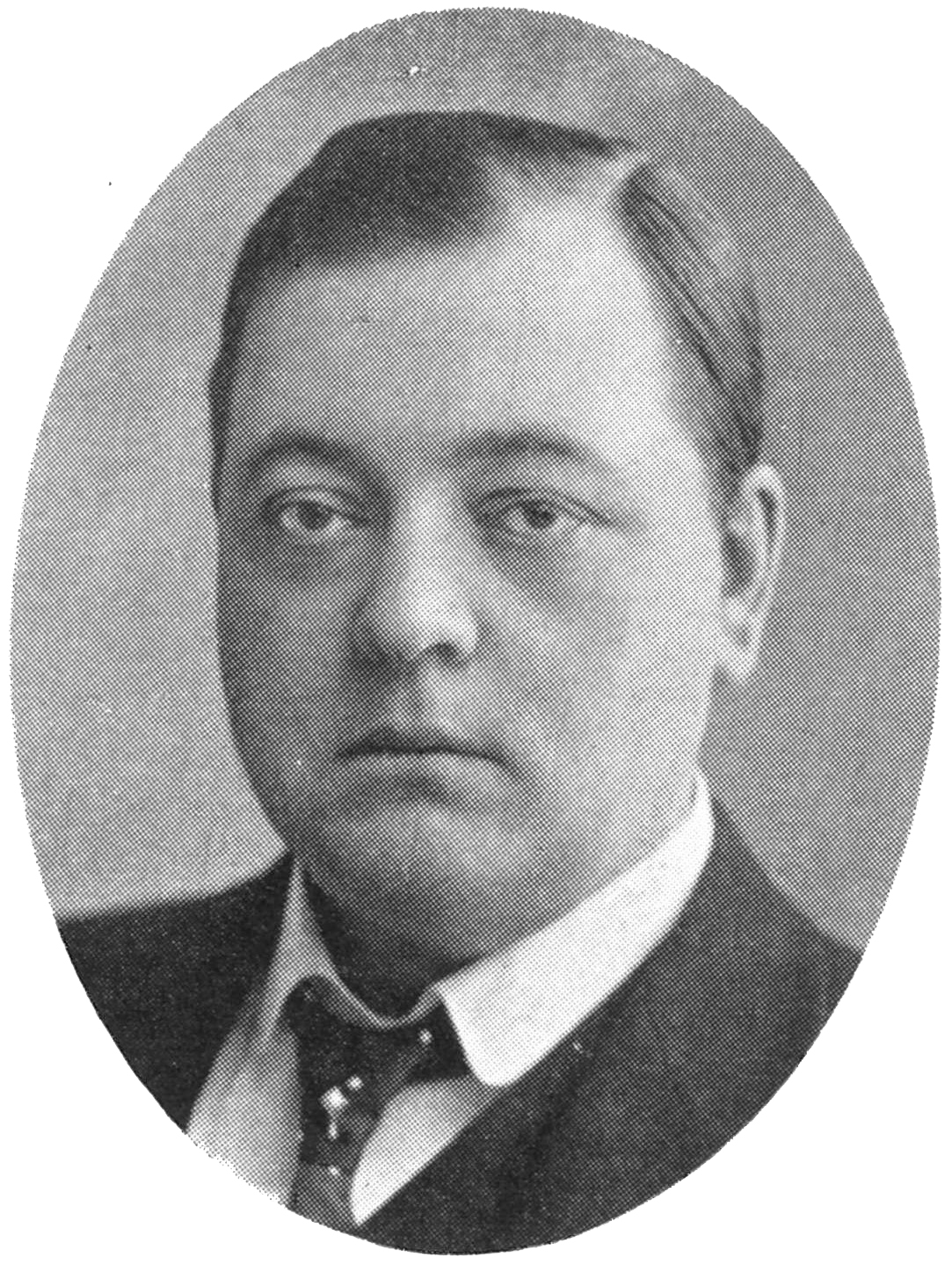
Professor Karl Petrén (1868-1927).

Karl Anders Petrén (1868–1927) was a Swedish physician who was a native of Halmstad.

He studied medicine under Magnus Blix (1849-1904) in Sweden and with Joseph Jules Dejerine (1849-1917) in Paris. He received his doctorate in 1896, and later served as a professor of practical medicine in Uppsala and Lund.

Petrén is remembered for his work with diabetes prior to the days of readily available insulin. He advocated a low-carbohydrate diet that was very high in fat to treat diabetes. He noticed that adding meat to the diet of diabetic individuals sometimes exacerbated or induced ketosis, whereas a diet with a high fat content reduced ketosis. He demonstrated that if protein intake was limited, and the amount of fat in the diet was large enough, ketosis in diabetes could be eliminated.

In 1901, Petrén published an important treatise on gait disorders titled Uber den Zusammenhang zwischen anatomisch bedingter und functioneller gangstorung im Greisenalter, in which he describes a condition called "trepidant abasia" or "trembling abasia".

One of his sisters was Louise Petrén-Overton, the first Swedish woman with a doctorate in mathematics.

== Selected publications ==
- Ueber den Zusammenhang zwischen organischen Veränderungen des Nervensystems und functionellen nervösen Symptomen im Greisenalter, 1898 - On the relationship between organic changes in nervous system functions and nervous symptoms.
- Lærebog i intern Medicin, 1915 (13 total editions) - Textbook of internal medicine.
- Über Eiweissbeschränkung in der Behandlung des Diabetes gravis, 1923 - On protein restriction in the treatment of diabetes gravis.
- Les différentes formes de l'arsenicisme et en particulier de l'arsenicisme provenant de l'habitation ou des objets domestiques, 1926 - Different forms of arsenic poisoning, etc.
