= Chancellor of Justice (Sweden) =

- Justitiekanslern (JK)
- Seal of the chancellor of justice

Agency overview
- Formed: 1713
- Headquarters: Stockholm
- Employees: 30
- Annual budget: SEK 34,488,000 (2012)
- Agency executive: Thomas Bull, Chancellor of Justice
- Parent agency: Ministry of Justice
- Website: Official website

The chancellor of justice (Swedish: Justitiekanslern [jɵsˈtîːtsɪɛˌkanslɛɳ]; JK) is a Swedish government agency (with the agency head holding the same title as the agency name) charged with representing the Government of Sweden in various legal matters as the government's ombudsman. The office was originally created through a decree issued by King Charles XII in 1713.

The Chancellor is appointed by the Government and serves at its pleasure, though without belonging to the spoils system; the longest term in office this far having been 22 years. The current Chancellor of Justice is Thomas Bull, who entered office on March 1 2025.

== List ==
- Anders Leijonstedt (1714–1718)

Chancellor of Justice:

- Gabriel Stierncrona (1719–1723)
- Thomas Fehman (1723–1728)
- Johan Cederbielke (1728–1736)
- Olof Nordenstråle (1737–1739)
- Bernhard Cederholm (1739–1741)
- Peter Silfverskiöld (1742–1747)
- Carl Gustaf Löwenhielm (1747–1750)
- Johan Gerdesköld (1750–1753)
- Carl Lagerberg (1753–1755)
- Adam Fredenstjerna (1755–1758)
- Erik von Stockenström (1758–1769)
- Johan Rosir (1770–1772)
- Joakim Vilhelm Liliestråle (1772–1779).
- K.A. Trolle Wachtmeister (1779–1793)
- Göran Vilhelm Lode (1793–1796)
- K.A. Trolle Wachtmeister (1796–1809; acting: Fredrik Gyllenborg)
- Hans Gabriel Trolle-Wachtmeister (1809–1817, acting: Wilhelm af Klinteberg)
- Jonas Gustaf Turdfjæll (1817–1819)
- Erik Johan Bergenschöld (1819–1835)
- Nils Snoilsky (1835, acting)
- Carl Petter Törnebladh (1836–1837)
- Klas Ulrik Nerman (1837–1840)
- Arvid Gustaf Faxe (1840–1844)
- Nils Samuel von Koch, tjf (1844–1848)
- Nils Samuel von Koch (1848–1866; 1854, 1855 Carl Johan Thyselius acting)
- Arendt Dreijer (1866–1867)
- Frans Fabian Huss (1867–69)
- Carl Gustaf Carlsson Leijonhufvud (1869–1886)
- Johan Erik Elliot (1886–1899)
- Emil Sjöberg (1899–1919)
- Oscar Henry Arsell (1919–1933)
- Karl-Gustaf Hjärne (1933–1937)
- Olof Alsén (1937–1961)
- Sten Rudholm (1962–1967)
- Bengt Lännergren 1967–1973
- Ingvar Gullnäs 1973–1980
- Bengt Hamdahl 1980–1987
- Hans Stark 1987–1992
- Johan Hirschfeldt 1992–1996
- Hans Regner 1996–2001
- Göran Lambertz 2001–2009
- Anna Skarhed 2009–2018
- Mari Heidenborg 2018–2025
- Thomas Bull 2025–

== See also ==
- Legal, Financial and Administrative Services Agency
