= Swedish Press Council =

Swedish regulatory body

The Swedish Press Council (Swedish: Pressens Opinionsnämnd, PON) is a body governed by the Swedish print media tasked with determining whether the actions of a newspaper is in line with good journalistic practice. Complaints regarding the practices of print media can be reported by the general public to the Press Ombudsman who determines whether a complaint should be brought before the Press Council. The PON can issue fines of up to SEK 2,000 and publish a rejecting opinion.

The charter of the PON, the standing instructions of the Press Ombudsman, and funding for both is the responsibility of the Press's Cooperation Committee (Pressens Samarbetsnämnd). The Press's Cooperation Committee is composed of the Swedish Media Publisher's Association (Tidningsutgivarna or TU), the Sveriges Tidskrifter (ST), the Swedish Union of Journalists (Svenska Journalistförbundet or SJF), and the Swedish Publicists' Association (Publicistklubben).
