= Supreme Court of Sweden =

Highest juridical instance in Sweden

- Högsta domstolen
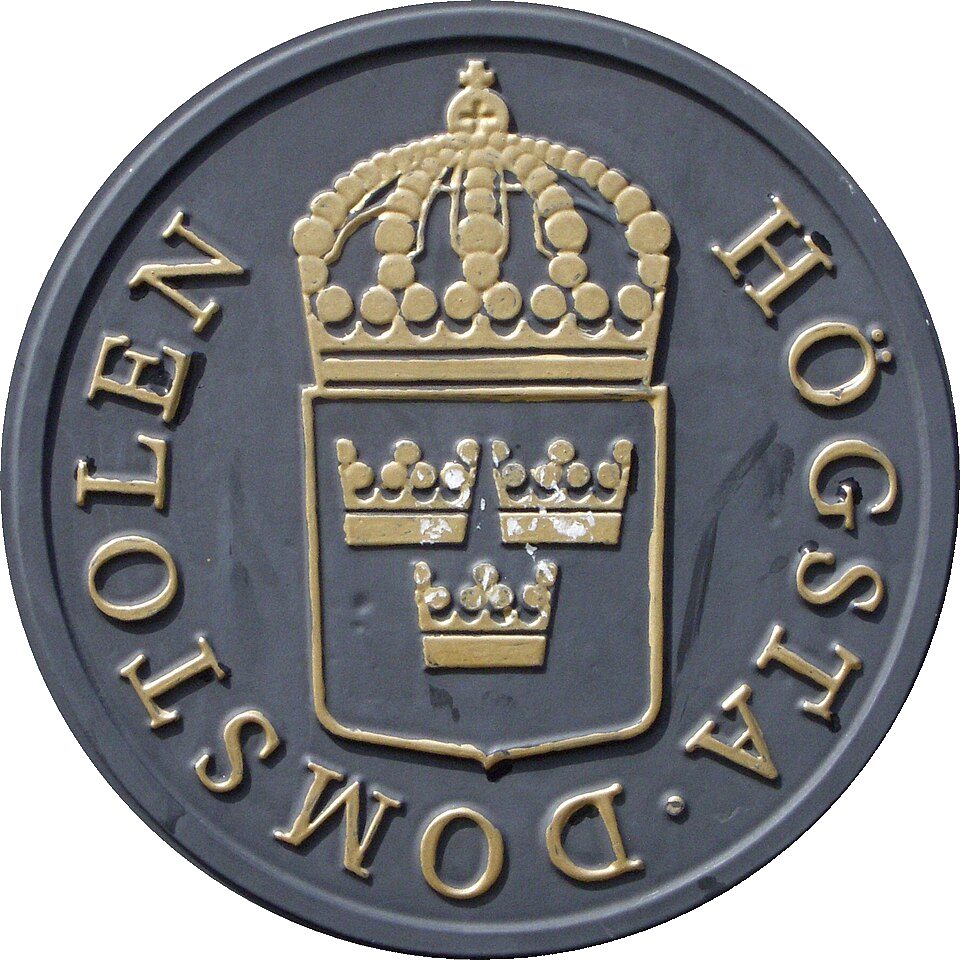
- Interactive map of Supreme Court of Sweden
- 59°19′34″N 18°03′59″E
- Established: 15 May 1789
- Jurisdiction: Sweden
- Location: Stockholm, Sweden
- Coordinates: 59°19′34″N 18°03′59″E
- Composition method: Government-appointed with parliamentary notification
- Authorised by: Swedish Constitution
- Judge term length: Life tenure with mandatory retirement at age 67; Senior judgeship for former justices by order of retirement
- Number of positions: 16, by statute
- Website: www.domstol.se/hogsta-domstolen/

President of the Supreme Court
- Currently: Anders Eka
- Since: 1 September 2018

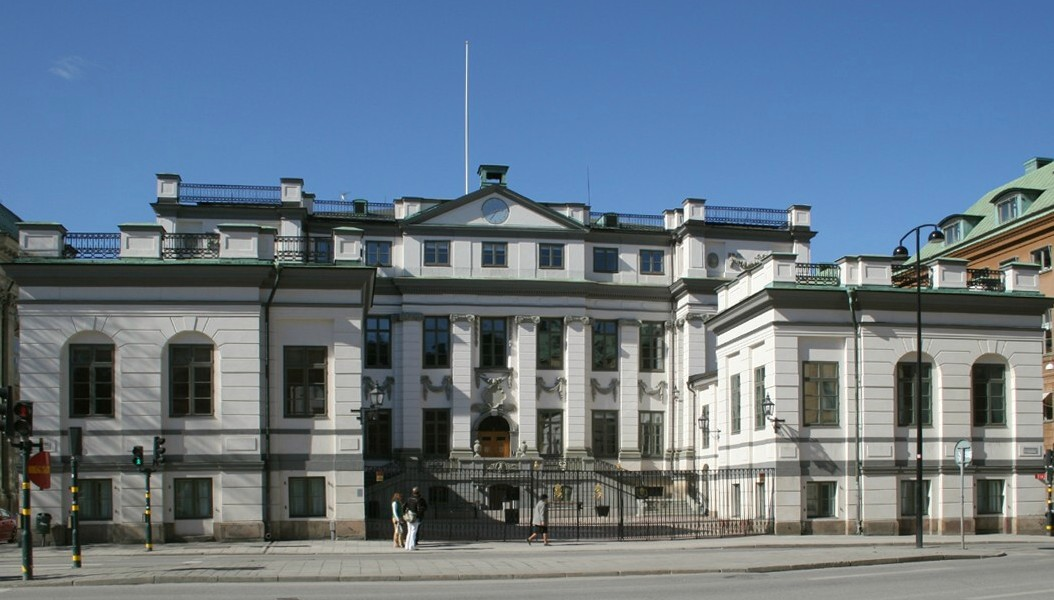
The Bonde Palace in Gamla stan, Stockholm, is the seat of the Supreme Court.

The Supreme Court of Sweden (Swedish: Högsta domstolen, HD) is the supreme court and the third and final instance in all civil and criminal cases in the Kingdom of Sweden. Before a case can be decided by the Supreme Court, leave to appeal must be obtained, and with few exceptions, leave to appeal can be granted only when the case is of interest as a precedent.

The Supreme Court consists of 16 Justices (Swedish: justitieråd) who are appointed by the government, but the process is guided by an independent body, the Judges Proposals Board (Domarnämnden), which vets candidates and submits a list of recommended, highly qualified individuals after assessing their legal expertise and experience. The Board evaluates applicants, conducts interviews, and provides the government with proposals, ensuring professional merit, though the Executive branch of Government makes the final decision. Such practice of selecting judges by the Executive Branch is actually more common in most countries than the American way, which requires a confirmation by a Legislature.

The court as an institution is independent of the Riksdag, and the Government is not able to interfere with the decisions of the court.

Since 2018, justice Anders Eka serves as the chairman of the Supreme Court of Sweden.

== History ==
Historically, all judicial power was vested in the Monarch, but in 1614 Gustavus Adolphus instituted Svea Court of Appeal and authorized it to issue sentences in his name. Those not satisfied with sentencing were able to turn directly to the monarch, and appeals were handled by the Justice Department of the Privy Council (in Swedish: Justitierevisionen), a committee of that council.

Under the rule of King Gustav III, the noble Privy Council was suspended in 1789 after the Riksdag of the estates introduced an addition to the instrument of government from 1772 called the Union and Security Act. After the Riksdag ended, the King on 15 May instituted the King's Supreme Court (Swedish: Konungens högsta domstol) to handle legal matters. There were twelve judges of the court, half of which was to be nobles and half commoners. While in session, no more than eight judges could serve at the same time, and with equal numbers of nobles and commoners. In the court, the king held two votes, as well as the deciding vote in case of a tie. However, this voting right was never exercised, except on the centennial of the court, when King Oscar II took part in the decision of one case.

Under the 1809 Instrument of Government, the judges of the Supreme Court became salaried civil servants, with the title of Councillor of Justice (justitieråd). The earlier Lord High Steward or Justiciar (Riksdrots) became the new Minister of State for Justice (or Prime Minister for Justice) and the foremost member of the court in 1809, but when the modern government ministries were created in 1840, this minister of justice were separated from the court. In 1844 the requirement on equal numbers of noblemen and commoners in service as judges of the court was dropped.

In 1909, the Supreme Administrative Court (Regeringsrätten) and the Council on Legislation (Lagrådet) were created to assume certain tasks that had been handled by the Supreme Court. The Supreme Administrative Court assumed responsibility for ruling on administrative cases and the Legal Council received the responsibility for judicial review (strictly speaking legal preview). At the same time the monarch lost voting power in the court.

The right to appeal cases to the Supreme Court was limited for the first time in 1915. A special dispensation was required before trying a minor civil or criminal case. Dispensation was to be given when there was a ruling that could become a precedent, and in 1945 this requirement was extended to all cases.

In 1948, the legal procedure was supplemented with oral proceedings and to satisfy the need for additional space the Supreme Court was moved in 1949 from the Royal Palace to the Bonde Palace on Stadsholmen.

By the Instrument of Government of 1974 the Supreme Court discontinued the practice to award sentencing in the name of the Swedish monarch (Kungl Maj:t), as well as announcing them at the Royal Palace where they were adorned with the royal seal.

== Composition ==
The Councillors of Justice (Swedish: justitieråd) of the Supreme Court of Sweden as of 2025, followed by year of appointment:

- Anders Eka, Chairman (2013, Chairman since 2018)
- Stefan Johansson Chairman of Chamber (2016, Chairman of Chamber since 2025)
- Agneta Bäcklund (2010)
- Svante O. Johansson (2011)
- Dag Mattsson (2012)
- Stefan Johansson (2016)
- Petter Asp (2017)
- Malin Bonthron (2017)
- Eric M. Runesson (2018)
- Stefan Reimer (2019)
- Cecilia Renfors (2019)
- Johan Danelius (2020)
- Jonas Malmberg (2022)
- Christine Lager (2022)
- Anders Perklev (2023)
- Margareta Brattström (2023)
- Katrin Hollunger Wågnert (2025)

== Presidents of the Supreme Court of Sweden ==
- 1948-1948: Einar Stenbeck
- 1948–1952: Axel Afzelius
- 1952–1958: Ragnar Gyllenswärd
- 1958–1963: Carl Gustaf Hellquist
- 1963–1969: Nils Beckman
- 1969–1973: Sven Romanus
- 1973–1976: Sven Edling
- 1977–1979: Otto Petrén
- 1979–1984: Bengt Hult
- 1984–1986: Carl Holmberg
- 1986–1990: Olle Höglund
- 1990–1992: Sven Nyman
- 1992–1998: Anders Knutsson
- 1998–2002: Torkel Gregow
- 2002–2007: Bo Svensson
- 2007–2010: Johan Munck
- 2010–2016: Marianne Lundius
- 2016–2018: Stefan Lindskog
- 2018–present: Anders Eka
