= Assessor (law) =

Judge's or magistrate's assistant

In some jurisdictions, an assessor is a judge's or magistrate's assistant. This is the historical meaning of this word.

In common law jurisdictions, assessors are usually non-lawyers who sit together with a judge to provide either expert advice (such as on maritime matters) or guidance on local practices. The use of assessors nowadays is quite rare. In some jurisdictions, such as Fiji, assessors are used in place of juries. An assessor's opinion or view of a case is not binding on a judge.

The term "assessor" is also very generally applied to persons appointed to ascertain and fix the value of rates and taxes, and in this sense the word is used in the United States (see Assessor (property)).

== Civil law jurisdictions ==
In France and in all European countries where the civil law system prevails, the term assesseur is applied to those assistant judges who, with a president, compose a judicial court.

=== Denmark ===
In Denmark, it was the former title given to Supreme Court judges. Today the title is given to Deputy Judges. See Courts of Denmark.

=== Germany ===
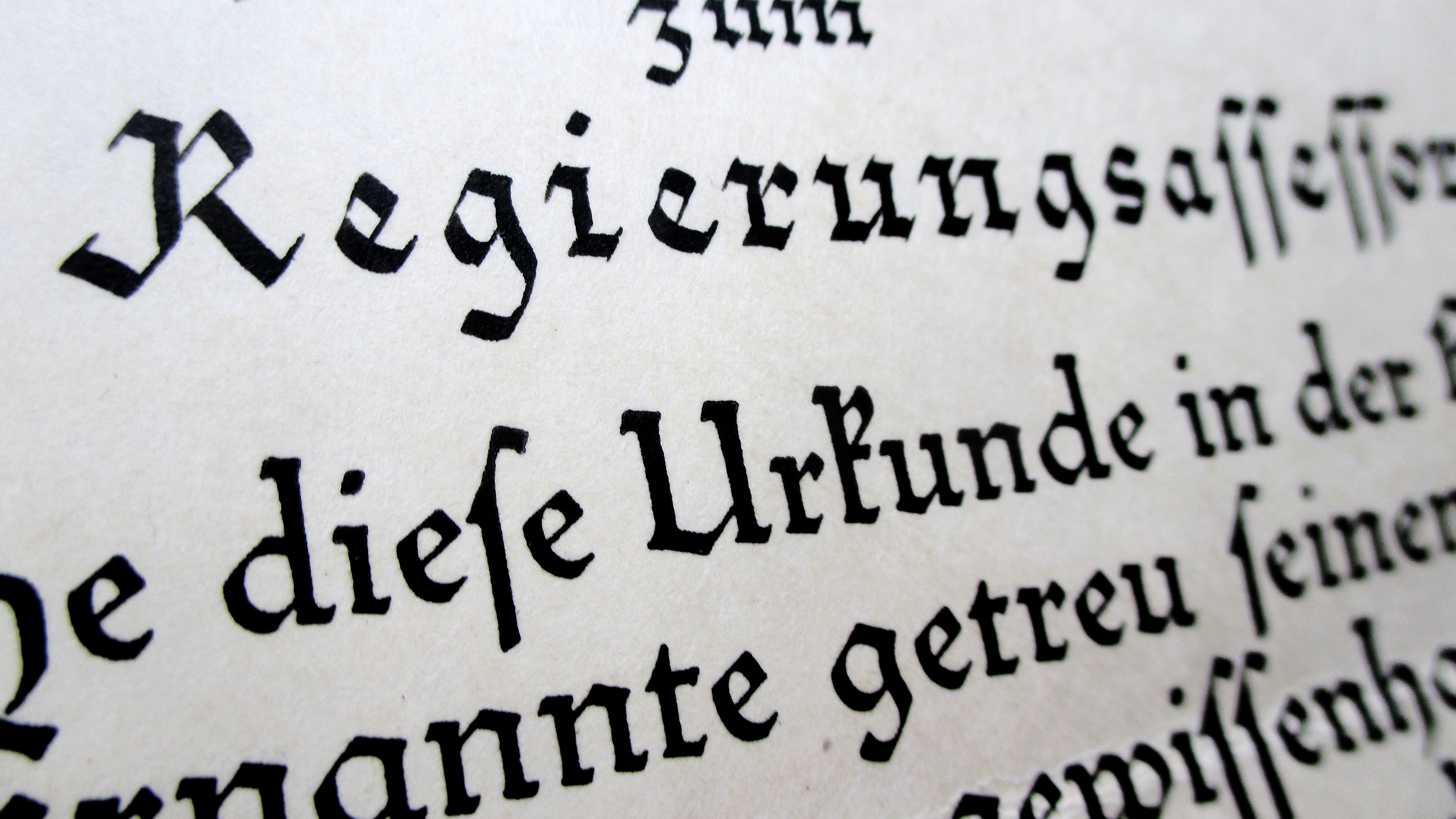
Certificate of appointment of a full lawyer as government assessor - (excerpt) - 3rd Reich - Berlin 17 October 1939 - The Reich Minister of Labour

In Germany, Rechtsassessor ("assessor of law") is a title held by graduates of law who have passed both the first and the second of the two state exams (finishing law school and a two-year legal clerkship) qualifying for a career in a legal profession such as judge or prosecutor, attorney at law or civil-law notary.

=== Italy ===
In Italy, an assessor (in Italian: assessore) is a member of a Giunta, the executive body in all levels of local government: regions, provinces and communes.

=== Norway ===
In Norway, the title was used for any judge before 1927.

=== Sweden ===
In 1614, assessor became the title of the lowest permanent court official, both in the court of appeal and the court chapter. In contemporary Sweden, a judge who has been a district court clerk for two years, an appeal court clerk for at least one year, a deputy district judge for at least two years and a deputy appeal court judge for one year gets, if he or she is approved, the title assessor. Hovrättsassessor = assessor of the civil and criminal appeal court. Kammarrättsassessor = assessor of the administrative appeal court. Having the degree of assessor is the most common way of getting a constitutionally protected position as a judge (ordinarie domare), but increasingly advocates, prosecutors and doctors of law are also appointed to these positions.

=== Soviet Union ===
In the former Soviet Union, a judge presiding at trial was assisted by two "people's assessors" drawn much like jurors from citizens in the community. They did not rule on matters of law but could allow or deny objections. When the trial is completed, the judge and people's assessors decided on a verdict.

=== China ===
In People's Republic of China, "people's assessors" can form a judicial panel together with professional judges to try cases. People's assessors are selected from the residents within the court's jurisdiction. Besides a single judge, judicial panels can consist of one judge and two assessors or three judges and four assessors to try cases. The people's assessors mostly enjoy the same rights as professional judges, but they should only vote on the findings of the fact, not on the matter of law.

=== Polish–Lithuanian Commonwealth ===
In the Polish–Lithuanian Commonwealth, assessors were also members of the judiciary, sitting on the so-called chancellor courts or assessor's courts.

== Common law jurisdictions ==
=== Fiji ===
Serious criminal trials are conducted by a judge sitting with four lay assessors.

=== Hong Kong ===
S.53 of the High Court Ordinance provides that a judge in the Court of First Instance may sit with one or more assessor who holds special qualifications. It is not normal practice for the court to sit with assessors.

=== South Africa ===
In serious criminal cases (such as murder) appearing before the High Court, two assessors may be appointed to assist the judge. Assessors are usually advocates or retired magistrates. They sit with the judge during the court case and listen to all the evidence presented to the court. At the end of the court case they give the judge their opinion. The judge does not have to listen to the assessors' opinions but it usually helps the judge to make a decision. The assessors may also only make decisions on facts, not on the law, which is solely the authority of the judge.

=== United Kingdom ===
Nautical assessors are experts in maritime matters who may assist the court in cases where their special knowledge is relevant. In the law of England and Wales, this usually happens in the Admiralty Court (part of the High Court of Justice), or on appeal to higher courts including the Supreme Court. The number of assessors used will depend on the complexity of the matter at hand, and their presence generally substitutes for the use of expert witnesses by the litigants. Nautical assessors are almost always Elder Brethren of Trinity House. In Scotland, nautical assessors are similarly used in cases before the Court of Session. Specific rules for the appointment of assessors exist for discrimination cases under the Equality Act 2010, for landlord and tenant disputes before a county court. Some courts and tribunals use "legal assessors", when the person leading the court is not themselves trained in the law. This may happen in cases before panels of the General Medical Council, or a Justice of the peace court in Scotland.

== See also ==
- Lay assessor
- Lay judge
- Lay judges in Japan
- Lay judges in Sweden
- Side judge
- Special master
