= Council on Legislation (Sweden) =

The Council on Legislation (Swedish: Lagrådet) is a Swedish government agency composed of current and former justices of the Supreme Court and Supreme Administrative Court. Its function is to pronounce on the legal validity of legislative proposals at the request of the government or a Riksdag standing committee.

The council's pronouncements are not binding, but are usually adhered to. The government is not obligated to allow the council to review every bill (proposition), but it has to provide a rationale if it does not allow the council do so.

Using legal terminology, the Legislative Council carries out judicial preview or alternatively abstract legal review.
