= Hovrättsråd =

Swedish and Finnish judicial title

A hovrättsråd (Swedish) or hovioikeudenneuvos (Finnish) is a judge of the Swedish or Finnish Court of Appeal (hovrätt or hovioikeus). Until 1789 hovrätt was the highest judicial body in Sweden. Today the courts are the second highest general courts in both countries.
