= Ministry of Justice (Sweden) =

Government ministry of Sweden

- Justitiedepartementet
- Lesser Coat of Arms

Agency overview
- Formed: 16 May 1840
- Jurisdiction: SFS 1996:1515
- Headquarters: Herkulesgatan 17, Stockholm
- Employees: 387 (2024)
- Annual budget: SEK 492 million (2025)
- Ministers responsible: Gunnar Strömmer, Head of the Ministry Minister for Justice; Johan Forssell, Minister for Migration
- Parent agency: Government Offices (Note: Before 1 January 1975, the Government Offices was called the Royal Chancery.)
- Website: www.government.se

The Ministry of Justice (Swedish: Justitiedepartementet) is a ministry in the Government of Sweden responsible for policies related to combating terrorism, democracy and human rights, family law, the judicial system, migration and asylum and the Constitution of Sweden.

The ministry is currently headed by the Minister for Justice, Gunnar Strömmer of the Moderate Party.

== History ==
The ministry was established on 16 May 1840 through the 1840 Departmental reform. Throughout its history, the Ministry of Justice was headed by the Prime Minister of Justice from 1840 to 1876 and since then by the Minister for Justice.

The ministry have also had a range of other cabinet ministers within the ministry. Johan Forsell, Minister for Migration, is the only other cabinet minister besides the head of the ministry since September 2024.

It's located on Herkulesgatan 17 in Stockholm.

== Government agencies ==
The Ministry of Justice is principal for 18 government agencies:

- Chancellor of Justice (Justitiekanslern)
- Commission on Security and Integrity Protection (Säkerhets- och integritetsskyddsnämnden)
- Crime Victim Authority (Brottsoffermyndigheten)
- Authority for Privacy Protection (Integritetsskyddsmyndigheten)
- Economic Crime Authority (Ekobrottsmyndigheten)
- Migration Agency (Migrationsverket)
- Board of Forensic Medicine (Rättsmedicinalverket)
- Council for Crime Prevention (Brottsförebyggande rådet)
- Courts Administration (Domstolsverket)
- Police Authority (Polismyndigheten)
- Security Service (Säkerhetspolisen)
- Prison and Probation Service (Kriminalvården)
- Prosecution Authority (Åklagarmyndigheten)
- Inspectorate of Auditors (Revisorsinspektionen)
- Gene Technology Advisory Board (Gentekniknämnden)
- Legal Aid Authority (Rättshjälpsmyndigheten)
- Judges Proposals Board (Domarnämnden)
- Council on Legislation (Lagrådet)

== Policy areas ==
- Combating terrorism
- Democracy and human rights
- Family law
- Judicial system
- Migration and asylum
- The constitution of Sweden and personal privacy

The ministry is also closely involved in European Union-related issues. Four areas in particular stand out; judicial and domestic issues (police and judicial cooperation in penal law, judicial cooperation in civil law), internal market issues (e.g. patents, copyright and company law), openness (public access to official documents), and discrimination (equal treatment).

== See also ==
- Government of Sweden
- Judiciary of Sweden
