= Court of appeal (disambiguation) =

A court of appeal is an appellate court.

Court of Appeal may refer to:

In Australia:

- Australian Capital Territory Court of Appeal, name used by the Supreme Court of the Australian Capital Territory exercising its appeal jurisdiction
- New South Wales Court of Appeal
- Supreme Court of Victoria, Court of Appeal
- Court of Appeal of the Northern Territory of Australia
- Supreme Court of Queensland, Court of Appeal
- Supreme Court of Western Australia, Court of Appeal

In Belgium:

- Court of appeal (Belgium)

In Brazil:

- Court of appeal of Rio Grande do Norte State

In Canada:

- Federal Court of Appeal (Canada)
- Alberta Court of Appeal
- British Columbia Court of Appeal
- Manitoba Court of Appeal
- Court of Appeal of New Brunswick
- Court of Appeal of Newfoundland and Labrador
- Court of Appeal for the Northwest Territories
- Nova Scotia Court of Appeal
- Nunavut Court of Appeal
- Court of Appeal for Ontario
- Court of Appeal of Prince Edward Island
- Quebec Court of Appeal
- Court of Appeal for Saskatchewan
- Court of Appeal of Yukon

In Cameroon:

- Court of Appeal of Cameroon

In the Cook Islands:

- Cook Islands Court of Appeal

In Fiji:

- Court of Appeal of Fiji

In France:

- Court of Appeal of Paris
- Court of appeal (France)

In Germany:

- High Court of Appeal of the Four Free Cities

In Hong Kong:

- Court of Appeal (Hong Kong)

In Iceland:

- Court of Appeal (Iceland)

In Ireland:

- Court of Appeal (Ireland)
- Court of Appeal in Ireland

In Kenya:

- Court of Appeal of Kenya

In Kiribati:

- Kiribati Court of Appeal

In Malaysia:

- Court of Appeal (Malaysia)

In Monaco:

- Court of Appeal of Monaco

In New Zealand:

- Court of Appeal of New Zealand

In Nigeria:

- Nigerian Courts of Appeal

In Norway:

- Court of appeal (Norway)
  - Agder Court of Appeal
  - Borgarting Court of Appeal
  - Eidsivating Court of Appeal
  - Frostating Court of Appeal
  - Gulating Court of Appeal
  - Hålogaland Court of Appeal

In Singapore:

- Court of Appeal of Singapore

In South Africa:

- Supreme Court of Appeal

In Sri Lanka:

- Court of Appeal of Sri Lanka

In Sweden:

- Courts of appeal in Sweden
  - Svea Court of Appeal
  - Göta Court of Appeal
  - Scania and Blekinge Court of Appeal
  - Court of Appeal for Western Sweden
  - Court of Appeal for Southern Norrland
  - Court of Appeal for Northern Norrland

In Tonga:

- Court of Appeal of Tonga

In Tuvalu:

- Court of Appeal of Tuvalu

In Uganda:

- Court of Appeal of Uganda

In Ukraine:

- Vinnytsia Administrative Court of Appeal

In the United Kingdom:

- Court of Appeal in Chancery (no longer in existence)
- Court of Appeal (England and Wales)
- Court of Appeal (Northern Ireland)
- East African Court of Appeal
- West African Court of Appeal
- West Indian Court of Appeal

In the United States of America:

- California Courts of Appeal
- Florida District Courts of Appeal
  - Florida First District Court of Appeal
  - Florida Second District Court of Appeal
  - Florida Third District Court of Appeal
  - Florida Fourth District Court of Appeal
  - Florida Fifth District Court of Appeal
- Louisiana Circuit Courts of Appeal
- Oklahoma Courts of Appeal

Nongovernmental:

- Fédération Internationale de l'Automobile International Court of Appeal

== See also ==
- Court of Appeals (disambiguation)
- List of Canadian courts of appeal
- Appeal
- Court of Criminal Appeal (disambiguation)
