= Appeal (disambiguation) =

An appeal is the process in law by which cases are reviewed and parties request a formal change to an official decision.

Appeal may also refer to:

== Politics and law ==
- Appeal (motion), in parliamentary procedure a challenge of the chair's ruling
- Appeal of 18 June, Charles de Gaulle's 1940 call for French resistance against Nazi Germany
- Mariam Appeal, a political campaign established in 1998
- Criminal appeal, an ancient, private right of criminal prosecution in common-law jurisdictions

== Publications and media ==
- The Appeal, a novel by John Grisham
- Appeal, an anti-slavery document by abolitionist David Walker
- The Commercial Appeal, a daily newspaper in Memphis, Tennessee
- Appeal to Reason (newspaper), a weekly left-wing political newspaper in the US until 1922
- The Appeal, English title of the 1970 animated short film by Ryszard Czekała, Apel
- The Appeal, online news site
- The Appeal (newspaper)

== Other uses ==
- Appeal Isimirie, Nigerian taekwondo practitioner
- Appeal (cricket), a request to an umpire for a ruling on whether a cricket batter is out
- Appeal play, in baseball when a member of the defensive team calls the attention of an umpire to an infraction
- Rhetorical appeals, devices used in rhetoric to persuade an audience, namely ethos, logos, and pathos
- Sex appeal, the quality of arousing attraction on the basis of sexual desire

== See also ==
- Appellate Division (disambiguation)
- Justice of Appeal (disambiguation)
- Lord of Appeal (disambiguation)
- Board of Patent Appeals and Interferences, former administrative law body of the United States Patent and Trademark Office
- Informal fallacy, reasoning error through appeal to something other than logical argument
- Preference, choosing between alternatives
- Taste (sociology), an individual's personal and cultural patterns of choice and preference
