= Parliament (disambiguation) =

A parliament is a legislature.

Parliament may also refer to:

== Locations ==
- Houses of Parliament, UK
- Parliament Café, a café that used to exist in Baghdad, Iraq
- Parliament railway station, Melbourne, Australia
- Parliament station, Ottawa, Canada

== Art, entertainment, and media ==
=== Games ===
- Parliament (card game), card game also known as Sevens

=== Music ===
- Parliament (band), a funk music band
- Parliament-Funkadelic, an American funk, soul and rock music collective, headed by George Clinton, whose style has been dubbed P-Funk
- The Parliaments, American doo-wop quintet

=== Television ===
- BBC Parliament, TV channel broadcasting footage from British parliaments
- Parliament TV (New Zealand)
- Parlement (TV series), European television series

== Biology ==
- A group of owls

== Other uses ==
- Parliament (cigarette), a brand of cigarettes
- Parliament Street (Toronto), Ontario, Canada
- Parliament streetcar line, a former line in Toronto, Ontario, Canada

== See also ==
- Parlement, a type of high court in ancien régime France
- Parliament Hill (disambiguation)
- Parliament Square (disambiguation)
- Houses of Parliament (disambiguation)
- Parliament House (disambiguation)
- List of legislative buildings
