= Human rights in Monaco =

Flag of Monaco

Monaco is a country governed by a sovereign prince and a National Council, who cooperate on all legislative procedures. The country had elections in 2013, which international observers declared legitimate. Monaco has established policy that protects human rights. Nevertheless, there has been pressure from various parties to improve said rights in the country.

There have been several recent cases of prisoner mistreatment in Monaco, including prison facilities that have allegedly failed to provide sufficient recreation time for prisoners. In addition, several large organizations such as the Council of Europe's European Committee for the Prevention of Torture have been active in reviewing the prison system in the country. Other issues include the preservation of national security, wherefore the country maintains voice recordings of anybody engaged in organized crime.

== Civil liberties ==
=== Freedom of expression ===
The country supports freedom of expression of its citizens, a right that is protected by the Constitution. Government authorities generally respect this right. However, the Monegasque Penal Code prohibits, among other things, any public criticism of the ruling family.

=== Freedom of religion ===
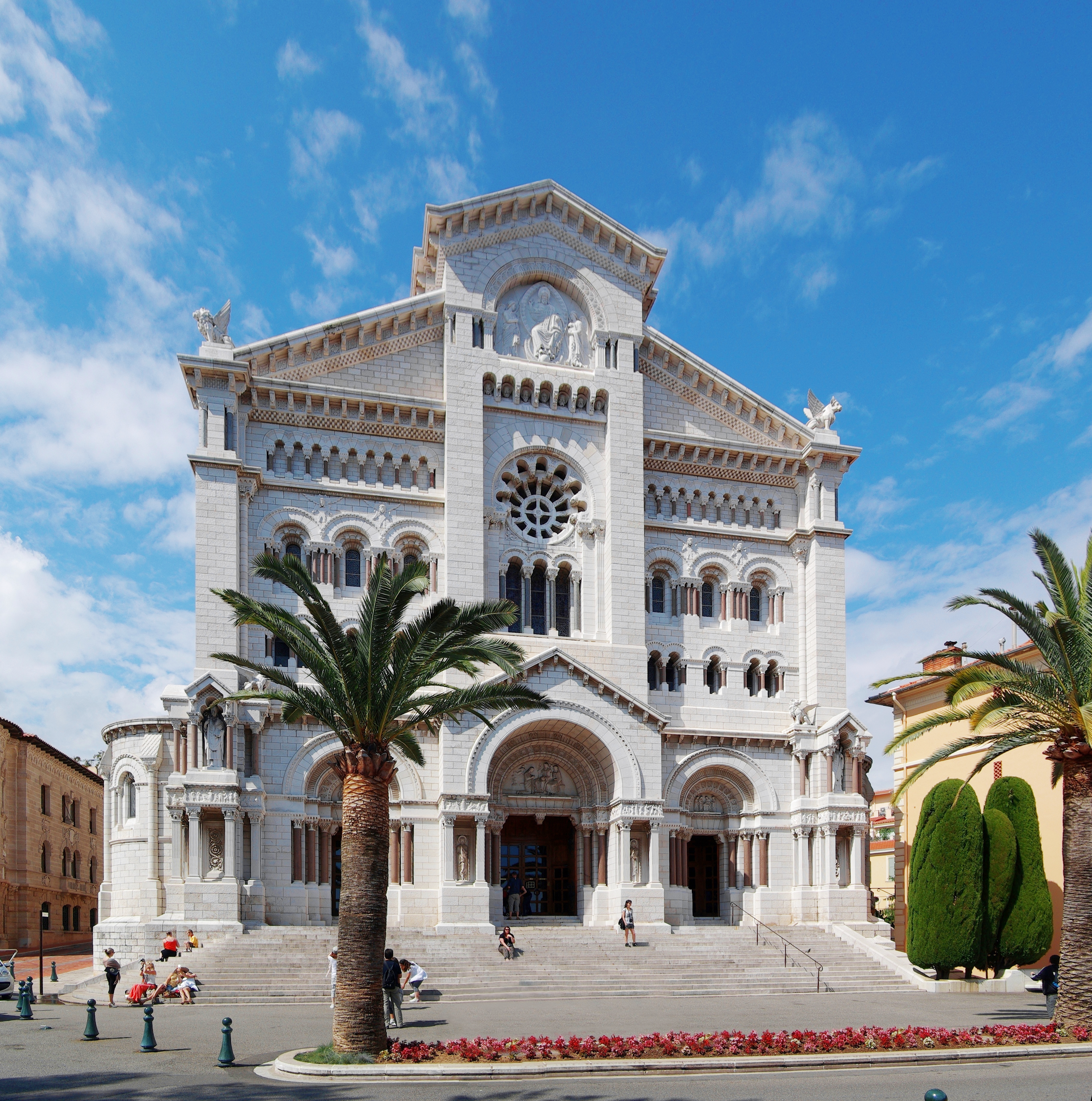
Cathedral

Roman Catholicism is the official religion of the state, with about 95% of Monegasques following the faith. Monaco is part of the Diocese of Gibraltar. The law allows full freedom of religion. The state has one cathedral, a synagogue, and five Catholic churches.

=== Freedom of movement ===
For the most part, residents of Monaco can move freely within the small area comprising the country. Certain regulations concern the right of Monegasques to work in adjacent countries. The Monegasque enjoy special rights relating to repatriation and the acquisition of foreign citizenship. As an example, while the state can revoke the nationality of a Monegasque for cause, such as naturalization in a foreign country, the prince has the power to restore citizenship after consulting with the Crown Council.

As to refugees, the government applies the 1951 Convention relating to the Status of Refugees and the 1967 Protocol. Monaco has several arrangements with France regarding political asylum of refugees, subject to French constitutional stipulations.

== Criminal justice system ==
=== Trial ===
There are three levels of judicial power in Monaco, which handle both civil lawsuits and criminal law. They include:

- Jurisdiction of First Instance – this jurisdiction is divided into offices of the Justice of the Peace, the Court of First Instance, and various other tribunals.
- Court of Appeal – the court of appeal reviews the judgments of appeal cases. The court of First Instance may also hear appeals, subject to government rules.
- The Court of Revision – this Court works as a secondary platform for deciding cases. It ensures that lower court levels apply the law appropriately. The Court may also decide to approve or quash an appeal, or may remand a case sua sponte for additional investigation.
- The Supreme Court of Monaco has specific jurisdictions. This includes:
  - Constitutional matters – the Supreme Court may review cases of annulment, legal compensations cases, and infringements of constitutional rights.
  - Administrative affairs – these include review of the actions of administrative authorities, as well as activities that involve annulment.

== Constitutional Rights in Monaco ==
The Constitution of Monaco protects its citizens from arbitrary arrests or trial, and from detention when a person is not suspected of a crime. Basic rights include a requirement that law enforcement authorities bring a person charged with a crime in front of a court of law within 24 hours. Monaco releases a significant portion of its detainees without bail. The investigating magistrate, though, may order the detention of an individual for as many as 120 days, based on investigative factors. Further, Monaco does not force its nationals into exile when suspected of a crime.

=== Prisons ===
The prison system of Monaco has drawn criticism from various quarters worldwide. Though Monaco endeavors to provide suitable resources for criminals, shortcomings have been alleged regarding the country’s correctional facilities. International human rights agencies have criticized Monaco for sending all long-term prisoner citizens to France, as well as the conditions in which prisoners detained more than 24 hours have been held. These include a lack of sufficient outdoor exercise or space for recreation; a lack of access to sunlight; and insufficient space for prisoners to keep their personal property.

The prison system in Monaco is controlled by independent, non-governmental parties such as CPT, which conducts regular appraisals of the prisons in Monaco. From these examinations, relevant prison officials are tasked with maintaining and supporting human rights within the correctional system.

== Protection ==
The judiciary and Constitution of Monaco address instances of abuse, and provide solutions thereto. The constitution also grants certain rights to the 5,000 residents classified as Monegasque nationals: free education, financial help for those in need, and the right to elect officials and hold positions of national office.

== Children's rights ==
Monaco's government generally supports children's rights and welfare. Health care programs for the young are plentiful.

Demographic studies conducted in 2010 showed that the mortality rate for children under five years had fallen below 4%. Furthermore, 97% of children have access to resources such as clean drinking water. Children also receive sufficient vaccination against diseases. Abortion, legalized in Monaco in 2009, is restricted to cases involving severe health problems.

The state has universal, mandatory public education for children. Reports from UNICEF state that the educational system needs to further respect human rights, as well as comply with the convention against discrimination in schools. The United Nations has made several recommendations for Monaco regarding legislation that further protects the rights of children.

Monaco actively promotes the right of children to not be enlisted in the military.
