= Law Reports =

Series of law reports published by the Incorporated Council of Law Reporting

The Law Reports is the name of a series of law reports published by the Incorporated Council of Law Reporting.

Pursuant to a practice direction given by Lord Judge during his tenure as the Lord Chief Justice of England and Wales, the Law Reports are "the most authoritative reports" and should always be "cited in preference where there is a choice." This requirement is further referred to in respect of appeals to the Court of Appeal in paragraph 29(2) of Practice Direction 52C of the Civil Procedure Rules.

This series is now divided into four main sub-series:

- Law Reports, Appeal Cases, covering decisions of the House of Lords (and, since 2009, the Supreme Court), the Privy Council and the Court of Appeal – started in 1866 as the Law Reports, English & Irish Appeals, renamed in 1875 and redesigned in 1891;
- Law Reports, Chancery Division, covering decisions of the Chancery Division of the High Court – started in 1865 as the Law Reports, Chancery Appeal Cases, renamed in 1875 and redesigned in 1890;
- Law Reports, Family Division, covering decisions of the Family Division of the High Court – started in 1865 as the Law Reports, Probate & Divorce Cases, renamed Law Reports, Probate, Divorce & Admiralty Division in 1875, renamed Law Reports, Probate in 1891 and renamed in 1972; and
- Law Reports, Queen's Bench, covering decision of the King's Bench Division (named the Queen's Bench Division during the reigns of Victoria and Elizabeth II) of the High Court – started in 1865, renamed Law Reports, Queen's Bench Division in 1875, renamed to drop "Division" in 1891, renamed to take account of the change of monarch in 1901, 1952 and 2022.

== Series ==
The number and names of the series have changed. This is partly due to the merger of existing courts, the merger of existing divisions of individual courts, and the creation of new divisions of individual courts. Citation of series has also changed.

=== 1865–1875 ===
The Law Reports were originally divided into eleven series. Glanville Williams said that "roughly speaking" there was a series for each of the superior courts. The series were:

- House of Lords, English and Irish Appeals
- House of Lords, Scotch and Divorce Appeals
- Privy Council Appeals
- Chancery Appeal Cases
- Equity Cases
- Crown Cases Reserved
- Queens Bench Cases
- Common Pleas Cases
- Exchequer Cases
- Admiralty and Ecclesiastical Cases
- Probate and Divorce Cases

These reports may be cited thus:

Series	Style of cause	(year of decision)	report	volume	series	page
House of Lords Appeals	... v ...	(...)	LR	...	HL	...
House of Lords, Scotch and Divorce Appeals	... v ...	(...)	L.R.	...	H.L.Sc.	...
House of Lords, Scotch and Divorce Appeals	... v ...	(...)	L.R.	...	H.L.Sc. and Div.	...
Privy Council Appeals	... v ...	(...)	LR	...	PC	...
Chancery Appeal Cases	... v ...	(...)	LR	...	Ch	...
Chancery Appeal Cases	... v ...	(...)	LR	...	Ch App	...
Equity Cases	... v ...	(...)	LR	...	Eq	...
Crown Cases Reserved	... v ...	(...)	LR	...	CC	...
Crown Cases Reserved	... v ...	(...)	LR	...	CCR	...
Queen's Bench Cases	... v ...	(...)	LR	...	QB	...
Common Pleas Cases	... v ...	(...)	LR	...	CP	...
Exchequer Cases	... v ...	(...)	LR	...	Ex	...
Admiralty and Ecclesiastical Cases	... v ...	(...)	LR	...	A & E	...
Probate and Divorce Cases	... v ...	(...)	LR	...	P & D	...

=== 1875–1880 ===
In 1875, the number of series was reduced to six. This was due to the creation of the High Court and a decision on the part of the publishers, to put the House of Lords, the Privy Council and the new Court of Appeal in the same volume, and to group Crown Cases Reserved and the Queen's Bench Division together. The series were:

- Appeal Cases
- Chancery Division
- Queens Bench Division
- Common Pleas Division
- Exchequer Division
- Probate Division

There was a change in the mode of citation. The abbreviation "LR" ceased to be used.

Series	Style of cause	(year of decision)	volume	series	page
Appeal Cases	... v ...	(...)	...	App Cas	...
Chancery Division	... v ...	(...)	...	Ch D	...
Queen's Bench Division	... v ...	(...)	...	QBD	...
Common Pleas Division	... v ...	(...)	...	CPD	...
Exchequer Division	... v ...	(...)	...	Ex D	...
Probate Division	... v ...	(...)	...	PD	...

=== 1881–1890 ===
In 1881, the number of series was reduced to four. This is because the Common Pleas and Exchequer Divisions of the High Court were incorporated in the Queen's Bench Division of that court in 1880:

- Appeal Cases
- Chancery Division
- Queens Bench Division
- Probate Division

Series	Style of cause	(year of decision)	volume	series	page
Appeal Cases	... v ...	(...)	...	App Cas	...
Chancery Division	... v ...	(...)	...	Ch D	...
Queen's Bench Division	... v ...	(...)	...	QBD	...
Probate Division	... v ...	(...)	...	PD	...

=== 1891 onwards ===
There have continued to be four series during this period, but their names have changed from time to time.

- Appeal Cases
- Chancery Division
- Queen's Bench Division (1891–1901, 1952–2022) / King's Bench Division (1901–1952, 2022–present) (From 1907, this series included decisions of the Court of Criminal Appeal in place of the former Court for Crown Cases Reserved.)
- Probate (Replaced in 1972 by a series called Family, due to the creation of the Family Division of the High Court)

In 1891, there was a change in the mode of citation. Volumes published from 1891 onwards are cited by the year in which they were published and numbered according to the order of publication in that year, if more than one volume has been published in that year.

Series	Style of cause	[year of report]	volume (if applicable)	series	page
Appeal Cases	... v ...	[...]	...	AC	...
Chancery Division	... v ...	[...]	...	Ch	...
Queen's Bench Division	R v Abbott	[1955]	2	QB	497
Queen's Bench Division	R v Adams	[1980]		QB	575
King's Bench Division	... v ...	[...]	...	KB	...
Probate Division	... v ...	[...]	...	P	...
Family Division	... v ...	[...]	...	Fam	...

== See also ==
- Law report § England and Wales
