= Court of appeals (disambiguation) =

A court of appeals is generally an appellate court.

Court of Appeals may refer to:

- Israeli Military Court of Appeals
- Corte d'Assise d'Appello (Italy)
- Court of Appeals of the Philippines
- High Court of Appeals of Turkey
- Court of Appeals (Vatican City)

== United States ==
- Courts of appeals
- Court of Appeals for the Armed Forces
- Court of Appeals for Veterans Claims
- Court of Appeals for the Federal Circuit
- Court of Appeals for the District of Columbia Circuit
- Court of Appeals for the First Circuit
- Court of Appeals for the Second Circuit
- Court of Appeals for the Third Circuit
- Court of Appeals for the Fourth Circuit
- Court of Appeals for the Fifth Circuit
- Court of Appeals for the Sixth Circuit
- Court of Appeals for the Seventh Circuit
- Court of Appeals for the Eighth Circuit
- Court of Appeals for the Ninth Circuit
- Court of Appeals for the Tenth Circuit
- Court of Appeals for the Eleventh Circuit
- Emergency Court of Appeals
- Temporary Emergency Court of Appeals (defunct)
- Alabama Court of Appeals (existed until 1969)
- Alaska Court of Appeals
- Arizona Court of Appeals
- Arkansas Court of Appeals
- Colorado Court of Appeals
- District of Columbia Court of Appeals
- Georgia Court of Appeals
- Hawaii Intermediate Court of Appeals
- Idaho Court of Appeals
- Illinois Court of Appeals
- Indiana Court of Appeals
- Iowa Court of Appeals
- Kansas Court of Appeals
- Kentucky Court of Appeals
- Louisiana Court of Appeals
- Maryland Court of Appeals
- Michigan Court of Appeals
- Minnesota Court of Appeals
- Mississippi Court of Appeals
- Missouri Court of Appeals
- Nebraska Court of Appeals
- New Mexico Court of Appeals
- New York Court of Appeals
- North Carolina Court of Appeals
- North Dakota Court of Appeals
- Ohio Seventh District Court of Appeals
- Ohio Eleventh District Court of Appeals
- Oregon Court of Appeals
- South Carolina Court of Appeals
- Tennessee Court of Appeals
- Texas Courts of Appeals
  - Fifth Court of Appeals
- Utah Court of Appeals
- Court of Appeals of Virginia
- Washington Court of Appeals
- Supreme Court of Appeals of West Virginia
- Wisconsin Court of Appeals

== See also ==
- Court of Appeal (disambiguation)
- Court of Criminal Appeal (disambiguation)
- Appeal
- State court (United States)#Nomenclature
- List of legal topics
- Federal Court of Appeals (disambiguation)
