= Appellate Division =

Appellate Division may refer to:

- Bangladesh Supreme Court, Appellate Division
- New York Supreme Court, Appellate Division
- New Jersey Superior Court, Appellate Division

== See also ==
- Supreme Court of Prince Edward Island#Appeal_Division
- Court of Appeal (disambiguation)
- Court of Appeals (disambiguation)
- State court (United States)#Nomenclature
