= Lesser included offense =

Concept in criminal law

In criminal law, a lesser included offense is a crime for which all of the elements necessary to impose liability are also elements found in a more serious crime. It is also used in non-criminal violations of law, such as certain classes of traffic offenses.

For example, the common law crime of larceny requires the taking and carrying away of tangible property from another person, with the intent of permanently depriving the owner of that property. Robbery, under the common law, requires all of the same elements and also the use of force or intimidation to accomplish the taking. Therefore, larceny is a lesser included offense in the offense of robbery, as every robbery includes a larcenous act as part of the crime. Assault is also a lesser included offense of robbery, just as false imprisonment is usually a lesser included offense of kidnapping. However, an offense will not be a lesser included offense if it carries a maximum penalty greater than that carried by the charged offense.

== Merger doctrine ==
Under the merger doctrine as this term is used in criminal law, lesser included offenses generally merge into the greater offense. Therefore, a person who commits a robbery cannot be convicted of both the robbery and the larceny that was part of it. In Canadian law, the leading case on this principle is Kienapple v R and the principle is therefore commonly called the Kienapple principle.

Solicitation to commit a crime and attempt to commit a crime, although not strictly speaking lesser included offenses, merge into the completed crime. As an important exception, the crime of conspiracy does not merge into the completed crime.

== Use in jury proceedings ==
In criminal jury trials, the court is permitted (but not required) to instruct jurors that they can find the defendant guilty of the most serious crime charged, or of a lesser included offense of that crime (in English law, this is termed an alternative verdict).

In murder cases, however, where a convicted defendant may face capital punishment, the United States Supreme Court has held in Beck v. Alabama (1980) that the court must instruct the jury that they may find the defendant guilty of a lesser included offense such as voluntary manslaughter. The reasoning for this ruling is that when the jury is not given the ability to convict for a lesser offense, the jurors might opt to convict a less culpable defendant instead of letting the defendant go free, essentially convicting of a more serious crime than the facts warrant. As the Court noted, "the failure to give the jury the 'third option' of convicting on a lesser included offense would seem inevitably to enhance the risk of an unwarranted conviction. Such a risk cannot be tolerated in a case in which the defendant's life is at stake." Therefore, they must have at least one option that falls in between these extremes.

== Case law ==
- People v. Ireland – introduced the merger doctrine to California in the context of the felony murder rule
