= Court for Crown Cases Reserved =

19th-century criminal cases appeal court in England and Wales

English criminal courts system, 1848–1907

The Court for Crown Cases Reserved or Court for Criminal Cases Reserved was an appellate court established in 1848 for criminal cases in England and Wales to hear references from the trial judge. It did not allow a retrial, only judgment on a point of law. Neither did it create a right to appeal and only a few selected cases were heard every year.

== History ==
Prior to the creation of the Court for Crown Cases Reserved, an informal arrangement existed whereby an Assize judge unsure of a point of law would allow a conviction and pass sentence on the assumption that the point did not favour the accused, and then refer the point to his colleagues, who would consider it at Westminster Hall. If they decided the point did favour the accused, they had no power to overturn the conviction but would recommend a royal pardon. Law reports collecting such decisions were published as Crown Cases Reserved for Consideration; and Decided by the Judges of England (originally "the Twelve Judges of England"). For similar points of law at quarter sessions, the chairman could write to the Home Secretary, who consulted the Attorney General and Solicitor General regarding a possible pardon.

Crown Cases Act 1848 (Note: The citation of this act by this short title was authorised by section 1 of, and the first schedule to, the Short Titles Act 1896. Due to the repeal of those provisions it is now authorised by section 19(2) of the Interpretation Act 1978.)
- Act of Parliament
- Parliament of the United Kingdom
- Long title: An Act for the further Amendment of the Administration of the Criminal Law.
- Citation: 11 & 12 Vict. c. 78
- Territorial extent: England and Wales; Ireland; (Note: Section 7.)

Dates
- Royal assent: 31 August 1848
- Commencement: 31 August 1848 (Note: The Acts of Parliament (Commencement) Act 1793.)
- Repealed: 1 October 1966 (Note: The Criminal Appeal Act 1966 (Commencement No. 1) Order 1966 (SI 1966/1018).)
Other legislation
Amended by	Statute Law Revision Act 1875; Criminal Appeal Act 1907; Forgery Act 1913
Repealed by	Criminal Appeal Act 1966

Status: Repealed

Text of statute as originally enacted

The Court for Crown Cases Reserved was created by the Crown Cases Act 1848 (11 & 12 Vict. c. 78), introduced in the House of Lords by Lord Campbell. Under the act, after a conviction, the trial judge in a criminal case could refer the case by way of case stated to the new court. A case that was reserved would then be heard at Westminster Hall by at least five judges of the superior courts of common law (from 1875 High Court judges) including at least one among the Lord Chief Justice, Chief Justice of the Common Pleas, or Chief Baron of the Exchequer. The court could only hear appeals on a point of law; it could quash a conviction, but not order a retrial or alter a sentence. It was superseded in 1907 by the new Court of Criminal Appeal.

== Notable cases referred to the court ==
- R v Prince (1875)
- R v Coney (1882)

== Irish court ==
The Crown Cases Act 1848 also applied in Ireland. The Irish Court for Crown [or Criminal] Cases Reserved sat in the Four Courts in Dublin and included at least one of the Lord Chief Justice of Ireland, Chief Justice of the Irish Common Pleas, and Chief Baron of the Irish Exchequer. The 1907 abolition in England did not affect the Irish court. The Government of Ireland Act 1920 created new jurisdictions of Northern Ireland and Southern Ireland with separate court systems, and a new High Court of Appeal for Ireland with appellate jurisdiction over both systems, including under the 1848 act. This court was abolished by the Irish Free State (Consequential Provisions) Act 1922 and its powers in Northern Ireland given to the Court of Appeal of Northern Ireland, with the 1848 powers passed to a separate Court of Criminal Appeal in 1930. A Court of Criminal Appeal for the Irish Free State was established by the Courts of Justice Act 1924.

== Bibliography ==
- Cornish, W.; Clarke, G. (1989). Law and Society in England 1750-1950. London: Sweet & Maxwell. ISBN 0-421-31150-9.
