= Parliament building =

Parliament building and variations may refer to:

- Casa de la Vall: a two building complex (old and new) in Andorra la Vella, Andorra
- Palace of the Argentine National Congress, in Buenos Aires, Argentina
- Austrian Parliament Building
- Bangladesh Parliament Building
- Parliament Buildings (Barbados), a two building complex in Bridgetown, Barbados
- Brussels Parliament building
- Parliament Building (New Delhi), India
  - Old Parliament House, New Delhi (1927–2023)
  - New Parliament Building (New Delhi) (since 2023)
- Parliament Hill for the Canadian Parliament buildings
  - British Columbia Parliament Buildings, the official name of the provincial legislative buildings in Victoria, British Columbia, Canada
  - First Ontario Parliament Buildings
  - Parliament Building (Quebec), an eight-floor building and home to the Parliament of Quebec
- Toompea Castle, the Estonian Parliament building
- Parliament House, Helsinki, the Finnish Parliament building
- Parliament Building, Guyana
- Hungarian Parliament Building
- Parliament Buildings (Kenya)
- New Zealand Parliament Buildings
  - Beehive (New Zealand), the executive wing of the New Zealand Parliament Buildings
- Sri Lankan Parliament Building
  - Old Parliament Building, Colombo
- Palace of Westminster, for the United Kingdom Parliament buildings
  - Parliament Buildings (Northern Ireland), at Stormont in Belfast, Northern Ireland
  - Scottish Parliament Building, at Holyrood, Edinburgh, Edinburgh
  - Senedd building, at Cardiff Bay, Cardiff, Wales

== See also ==
- Houses of Parliament (disambiguation)
- Parliament House (disambiguation)
- Capitol (disambiguation)
- Diet (assembly)
- Legislative building
- Reichstag
- Forum (Roman)
- Senate
- Knesset
