= Parliament House =

Parliament House may refer to:

== Meeting places of parliament ==
=== Australia ===
- Parliament House, Canberra, Parliament of Australia
- Parliament House, Adelaide, Parliament of South Australia
- Parliament House, Brisbane, Parliament of Queensland
- Parliament House, Darwin, Parliament of the Northern Territory
- Parliament House, Hobart, Parliament of Tasmania
- Parliament House, Melbourne, Parliament of Victoria
- Parliament House, Perth, Parliament of Western Australia
- Parliament House, Sydney, Parliament of New South Wales

=== India ===
- Parliament House, New Delhi (disambiguation)
  - Old Parliament House, New Delhi (1927–2023)
  - New Parliament House, New Delhi (since 2023)

=== New Zealand ===
- Parliament House, Auckland
- Parliament House, Wellington

=== Elsewhere ===
- National Parliament House, Dhaka, Bangladesh
- Parliament House, Singha Durbar, Nepal
- National Parliament House, Port Moresby, Papua New Guinea
- Parliament House, Helsinki, Finland
- Parliament House of Thailand, the old Parliament house of Thailand
  - Sappaya-Sapasathan, the new Parliament house of Thailand
- Parliament House of Ghana
- York House, Grenada, known as Parliament House
- Alþingishúsið, Iceland
- Parliament House, Dublin, Ireland
- Parliament House (Malta)
- Parliament House, Islamabad, the meeting place of the Parliament of Pakistan
- Parliament House, Edinburgh, Scotland
- Parliament House, Singapore
- Malaysian House of Parliament
- Parliament House, Stockholm, Sweden
- Parliament House, Dodoma, Tanzania
- Parliament House, Tonga
- Parliament House, Harare, Zimbabwe

== Other uses ==
- Parliament House (hotel), a gay resort in Florida, United States
- Parliament House Motor Inn, a defunct chain of motor inns in the United States

== See also ==
- Houses of Parliament (disambiguation)
- Houses of Parliament (Palace of Westminster), the two houses of the Parliament of the United Kingdom
- New Parliament House (disambiguation)
- Old Parliament House (disambiguation)
- Owain Glyndŵr's Parliament House, Machynlleth, Wales
- Parliament buildings (disambiguation)
- Parliament Square (disambiguation)
- Legislative building
