= Irish Court of Appeal =

Irish Court of Appeal may refer to:

- Court of Appeal (Ireland) (since 2014)
- Court of Appeal in Ireland (1878–1921)
- High Court of Appeal for Ireland (1921–1922)
- Court of Appeal in Northern Ireland (since 1921)
- Court of Appeal in Southern Ireland (1921–1924)
- Court of Criminal Appeal (Ireland) (1924–2014)
- Court of Criminal Appeal (Northern Ireland) (1930–1978)
- Court of Appeal in Chancery in Ireland (1857–1877)
