= Italian Parliament (disambiguation) =

Italian Parliament may refer to:

- Italian Parliament, national parliament of the Italian Republic
- Italian Parliament (1928–1939), parliament of Italy from 1928 to 1939 years
- Parliament of the Kingdom of Italy, bicameral parliament of the Kingdom of Italy

== See also ==
- Parliament (disambiguation)
