= Old Parliament House =

Old Parliament House or Old Parliament Building may refer to:

- Old Parliament Building (Quebec), Canada
- Old Parliament Building, Colombo, Sri Lanka
- Old Parliament House, Adelaide, Australia
- Old Parliament House, Athens, Greece
- Old Parliament House, Bangkok, Thailand
- Old Parliament House, Canberra, Australia
- Old Parliament House, Dhaka, Bangladesh
- Old Parliament House, New Delhi, India
- Old Parliament House, Singapore, now known as The Arts House
- Old Parliament House, Sofia, Bulgaria
- Old Parliament House, Stockholm, Sweden

== See also ==
- Owain Glyndŵr's Parliament House, Machynlleth, Wales
- New Parliament House (disambiguation)
- Parliament House (disambiguation)
