= National Assembly Square =

National Assembly Square may refer to

- National Assembly Square, Sophia, Bulgaria
- National Assembly Square, Chișinău, Moldova

== See also ==
- Parliament Square (disambiguation)
