= People v. Ireland =

Californian court case

- Supreme Court of California

Decided February 28, 1969
- Full case name: The People v. Patrick Ireland
- Citation(s): 70 Cal.2d 522`450 P.2d 580; 75 Cal.Rptr. 188; 40 A.L.R.3d 1323

Case history
- Prior history: 70 Cal. Rptr. 381 (reversed)

Holding
- An assault cannot serve as the predicate felony for a murder conviction under the felony murder rule.

Court membership
- Chief Justice: Roger J. Traynor
- Associate Justices: Mathew Tobriner, Raymond E. Peters, Stanley Mosk, Raymond L. Sullivan, Louis H. Burke, Marshal F. McComb

Case opinions
- Majority: Sullivan, joined by Traynor, Peters, Tobriner, Mosk, Burke
- Dissent: McComb

People v. Ireland, 70 Cal.2d 522 (1969), was a case decided by the Supreme Court of California that first introduced the merger doctrine in that state.

== Decision ==
The defendant shot his wife with two .38 caliber bullets and killed her. The defendant was convicted of second degree murder after jury instructions were given that included an instruction on the felony murder rule. The California Supreme Court reversed the conviction based on the merger doctrine. The court reasoned that the underlying assault merged with the resulting homicide in the sense that the homicide did not require a felonious purpose independent of that required for the assault.
