= R v Prince =

Rex v. Prince, L.R. 2 C.C.R. 154 (1875), was an English case that held the mens rea necessary for criminal liability should be required for the elements central to the wrongfulness of the act, and that strict liability should apply to the other elements of the statute, such as the believed age of an abductee being irrelevant.

== Facts and defence argument ==
Henry Prince was accused of abducting a 14-year-old girl, Annie Phillips, having believed her to be over the age of 16 years old. She claimed to be 18 years old. Such an act was at that time in violation of Article or Section 55 of the relevant statute law, regarding minors. Prince argued that he had made a reasonable mistake in regards to Phillips' age. Despite his excuse for the crime, he was ultimately convicted.

== Reserved appellate judgment ==
The court certified the defence point as one of wider legal merit and the Court for Crown Cases Reserved confirmed the conviction as valid, per the ratio decidendi stated at the introduction of this article.

== See also ==
- Kienapple v R
