= Court of Criminal Appeal =

Court of Criminal Appeal may refer to:

- Court of Criminal Appeal (England and Wales)
- Court of Criminal Appeal (Ireland)
- Court of Criminal Appeal (Northern Ireland)
- Court of Criminal Appeal (Scotland)
- United States Army Court of Criminal Appeals
- Navy-Marine Corps Court of Criminal Appeals (United States)
- Coast Guard Court of Criminal Appeals (United States)
- Air Force Court of Criminal Appeals (United States)

== See also ==
- Appellate court
- Appeal
- Criminal law
