= New Parliament House =

New Parliament House may refer to:

- New Parliament House, Edinburgh, the proposed site for the Scottish Assembly in the 1970s
- New Parliament House, New Delhi the site for the Parliament of India since 2023
- Parliament House, Canberra, the current site of the Parliament of Australia
- Parliament House, Malta, the current site of the Parliament of Malta

== See also ==
- Old Parliament House (disambiguation)
- Parliament House (disambiguation)
