= Tribunal de Justiça do Estado do Rio Grande do Norte =

Maximum court of the Judicial power of Rio Grande do Norte, Brazil

The Tribunal de Justiça do Estado do Rio Grande do Norte (Court of appeal of Rio Grande do Norte State or simply TJRN) is the maximum court of the Judicial power of the Rio Grande do Norte State, Brazil. Part of Brazilian Judicial Power, his headquarters is located in the capital Natal. Its history begins in 1892.

== Jurisdiction ==
The court is the judicial instance to sue appeals against decisions pronounced by the judges of the counties of the State. Its functions are defined in the State Constitution, in the chapter VI, starting by the article 70, besides other statements. The judicial review of laws contested in opposition to the State Constitution, the criminal procedures against authorities like judges and mayors are other examples of cases of jurisdiction of the Tribunal de Justiça.

== Composition ==
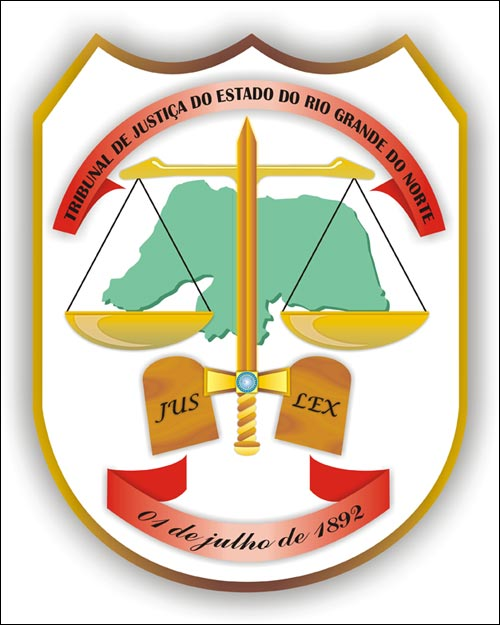
Symbol of TJRN

Nowadays, it has fifteen chief judges (desembargadores):

- Judite de Miranda Monte Nunes
- Caio Otávio Regalado de Alencar
- Amaury de Souza Moura Sobrinho
- Osvaldo Soares Cruz
- Rafael Godeiro Sobrinho
- Aderson Silvino
- Cláudio Santos
- Expedito Ferreira de Souza
- João Rebouças
- Vivaldo Otávio Pinheiro
- Saraiva Sobrinho
- Amilcar Maia
- Dilermando Mota
- Virgílio Fernandes
- Zeneide Bezerra

== History ==
The Court was born in the early republican regime, as consequence of the Law nº 12, of 9 June 1892, sanctioned by Governor Pedro Velho. The Superior Tribunal de Justiça as was named, had five desembargadores

== See also ==
- Brazil federal courts
- Superior Tribunal de Justiça
- Supremo Tribunal Federal
