= Federal Court of Appeals =

Federal Court of Appeals may refer to:

- Federal Court of Appeal (Canada)
- United States Court of Appeals for the Federal Circuit
