= Parliament House, Edinburgh =

Former parliament building in Edinburgh, now housing the Supreme Courts of Scotland

Parliament House
- Taigh na Pàrlamaid
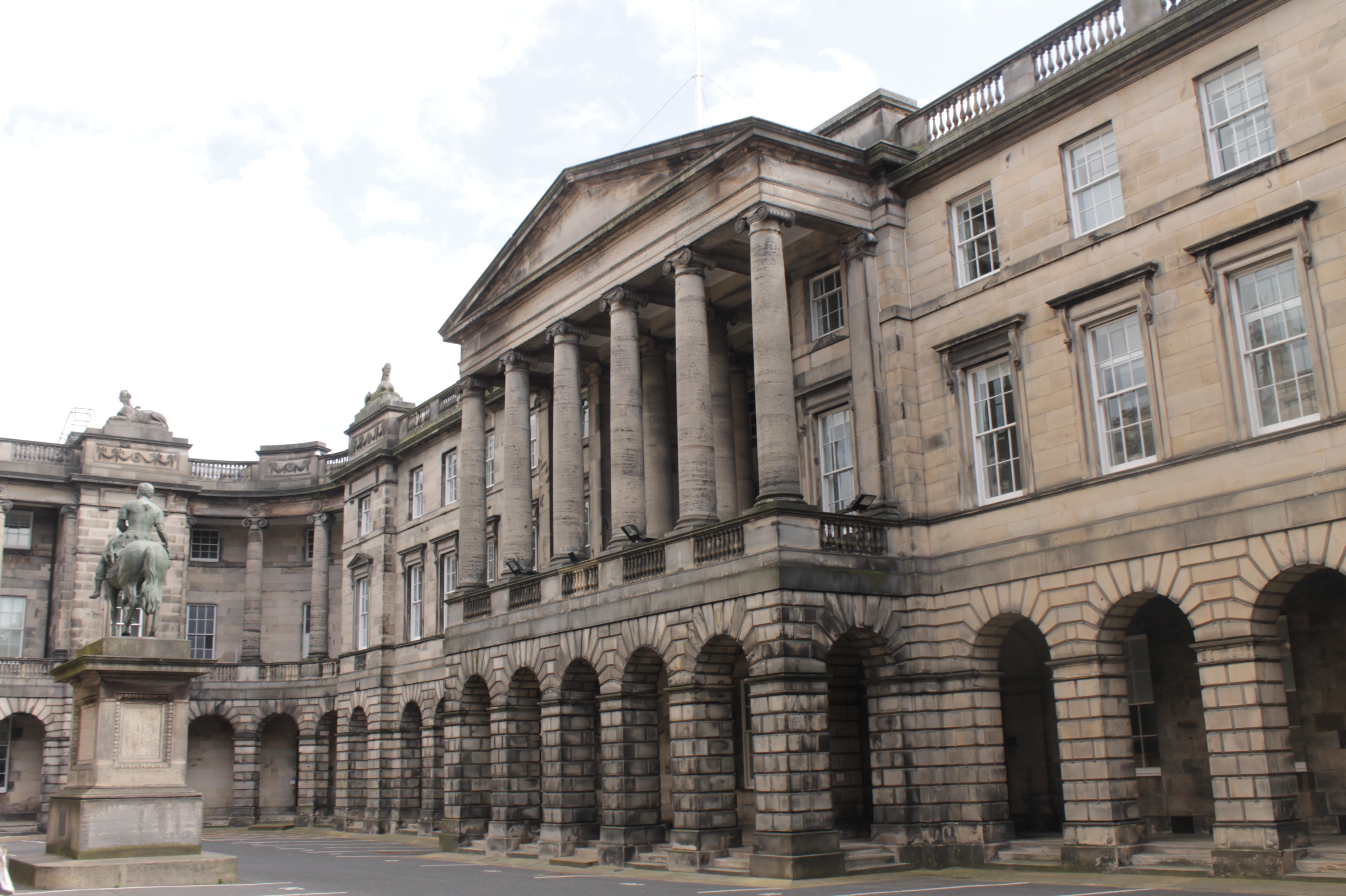
- Parliament Square and Parliament House
- Interactive map of the Parliament House area

General information
- Type: Houses of the Supreme Courts of Scotland (1707–); Parliament of Scotland (1639–1707)
- Architectural style: Renaissance (1632–1640); Classical (1803–1810; 1827–1838)
- Location: 2-11 Parliament Square, Edinburgh, Scotland, EH1 1RQ
- Coordinates: 55°56′56″N 03°11′26″W
- Current tenants: Scottish Courts and Tribunals Service
- Construction started: 1632
- Opened: 1639; 387 years ago

Technical details
- Material: ashlar and coursed rubble, timber and slate roofing
- Floor count: Eight

Design and construction
- Architects: James Murray (1631-40); Robert Reid (1803-10 and 1827-38); William Burn (1827-29)

Website
- Official website

Listed Building – Category A
- Official name: The Supreme Courts of Scotland excluding extensions onto Cowgate at southeast of site, 2-11 Parliament Square, Edinburgh
- Designated: 14 December 1970
- Reference no.: LB27699

Parliament House (Scottish Gaelic: Taigh na Pàrlamaid), located in the Old Town in Edinburgh, Scotland, is a historic parliament and court building containing several buildings which now houses the Supreme Courts of Scotland, the Scottish Land Court and the Lands Tribunal for Scotland. The oldest part of the complex, known as Parliament Hall, was home to the Parliament of Scotland from 1639 to 1707, and was the world's first purpose-built parliament building. The complex is spread across seven floors, and contains 700 rooms, with the original building first designed and built by James Murray and completed in 1639, costing £10,555 which was paid for by Edinburgh Town Council.

Prior to the construction of Parliament House, the Parliament of Scotland, the Court of Session and the Privy Council of Scotland all shared the same building which was located in the Tolbooth in Edinburgh. By 1632, it had become clear that the sharing of space between the three was inadequate, with Charles I demanding that Edinburgh Town Council provide a "suitable alternative". As a result, the town council proposed plans to create a new purpose-built parliament building which would also house the Court of Session on the same site, but faced difficulties in securing funds for the construction. The estimated cost was £11,630 sterling, or £127,000 Scots, the equivalent of £30 million by recent times. It was paid for by a number of subscriptions from Edinburgh residents, as well as a series of loans which "remained a burden on Edinburgh's finances for many years".

The first meeting of the Parliament of Scotland to be held within the new Parliament House was held on 12 August 1639. Following the ratification of the Acts of Union which resulted in the Parliament of Scotland being subsumed into the Parliament of Great Britain, the last meeting of the Parliament of Scotland occurred on 28 April 1707, leaving the Law Courts of Scotland as the sole occupier of Parliament House following the dissolution of the parliament. An extension was erected at Parliament House and opened in September 1992. Between 2007 and 2021, Parliament House was extensively refurbished at a cost of £5 million, including new offices, the inclusion of Judicial Training Suites, criminal courtrooms, accessible lifts and other fabric improvements.

Located just off the Royal Mile, beside St Giles' Cathedral, Parliament House is also the headquarters of the Faculty of Advocates, the Society of Writers to His Majesty's Signet, and the Society of Solicitors in the Supreme Courts of Scotland. Other buildings in the complex include the Advocates Library and the Signet Library. The entire complex is a Category A Listed building.

== History ==
In the 17th century, the Parliament of Scotland did not have a dedicated permanent home. Between 1438 and 1561, it had usually met in the Tolbooth in Edinburgh, a building which also housed the burgh council of Edinburgh and the Court of Session. From 1563 onwards Parliament regularly met in the chamber of the Court of Session, which was situated in the central aisle of St Giles' Cathedral. This chamber was becoming inadequate by the 1630s due to the increasing number of members of parliament. It was clear that Parliament required more suitable accommodation, there was a desire to restore St Giles’ solely to its original function as a place of worship, and Charles I requested that the burgh council provide a more commodious building. In March 1632, the council commissioned the building of a purpose-built parliamentary chamber, designed by James Murray, the King's Master of Works. The building cost £127,000 Scots, most of which came from Edinburgh's common good fund, with the remainder funded by public subscription from the citizens of Edinburgh.

== Parliament of Scotland ==
Parliament House was built between 1632 and 1640 on the west side of the sloping ground between St Giles’ Cathedral and the Cowgate which was occupied by the burial grounds of St Giles'. The burial grounds had ceased to be used for burials in 1566 (with the exception of the burial of John Knox in 1572). Three manses on the site which were occupied by the ministers of St Giles' were demolished to accommodate the new building. Although Parliament House was not completed until 1640 it hosted the 1639 session of Parliament, which opened on 12 August 1639. The building was built on an L-shaped plan, with the main block having three storeys, with the Parliament Hall and the Laigh Hall or Laigh House on the upper two storeys, and below these there was an undercroft. The two-storey south-east wing, known as the Treasury, contained chambers on each floor.

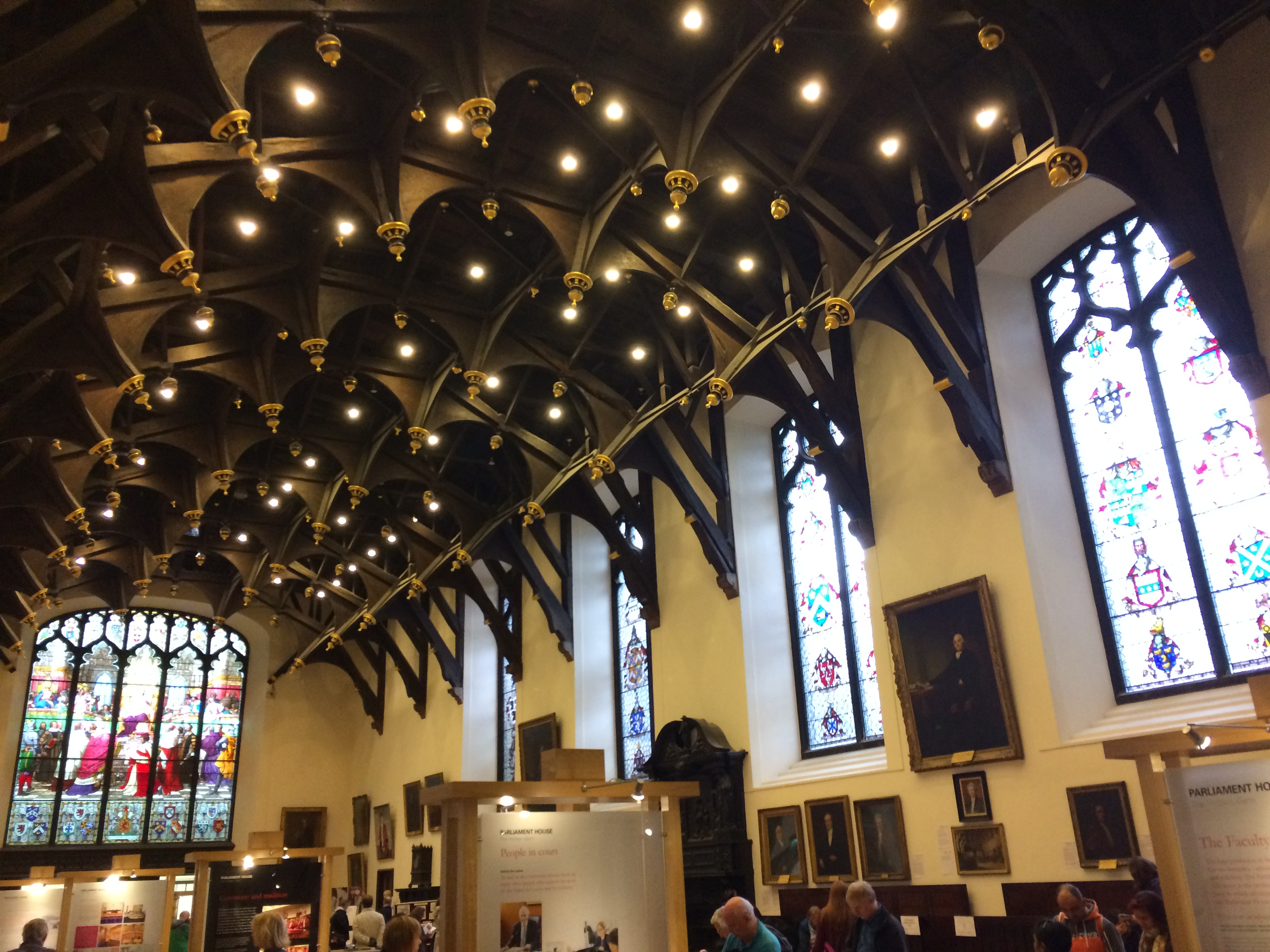
Parliament Hall, which was the chamber of the Parliament of Scotland from 1639 to 1707

The facade, overlooking Parliament Yard (later Parliament Square), was of ashlar, while the remainder of the building was rubble-built with ashlar dressings. The principal entrance was surmounted by a pediment containing the Royal Arms of Scotland, between statues of Justice and Mercy, beneath which was the Latin inscription 'Stant His Felicia Regna' ("Kingdoms stand happy by these virtues"). The statues, which were the work of Alexander Mylne, were removed around 1824, when the entrance doorway was demolished. They were recovered in 1909 and now stand inside Parliament House.

Parliament Hall, measuring 122 feet (40 m) by 49 feet (12 m), was used as the parliamentary chamber during sessions of parliament, and by the Court of Session when Parliament was not sitting.

The main feature of Parliament Hall is the elaborate oak trussed flat roof supported on carved stone corbels. It was constructed in 1637 by John Scott, the Edinburgh master wright. In the 17th and 18th centuries the walls were hung with tapestries and portraits of Scottish monarchs. The stained glass Great Window, by Wilhelm von Kaulbach and Max Emanuel Ainmiller, was erected in 1868 and commemorates the establishment of the College of Justice by James V in 1532.

James Howell visited Edinburgh in 1639 and wrote "there is a new Parliament House built here lately, and 'twas hoped his Majesty would have tane the maiden-head of it, and come hither to sit in person; and they did ill who advis'd him otherwise". Charles I became the first monarch to attend Parliament in the hall when he was present at the August-November 1641 session. The future monarchs James VII and Anne attended the 1681 session. Parliament Hall was also the venue for the parliamentary debates on the Treaty of Union between Scotland and England during the 1706-07 session.

== Supreme Courts of Scotland ==
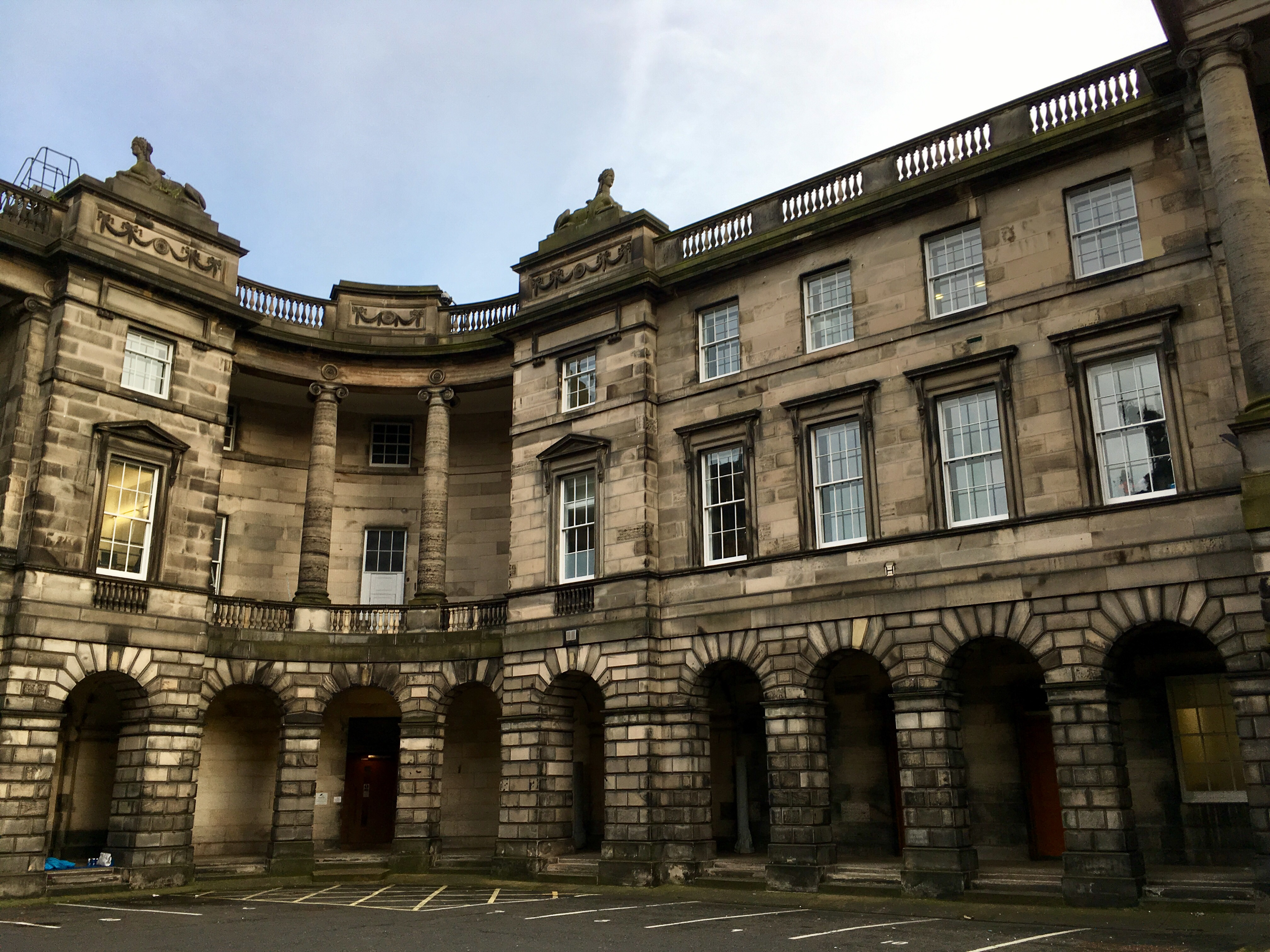
The High Court of Justiciary and Court of Session buildings at Parliament House

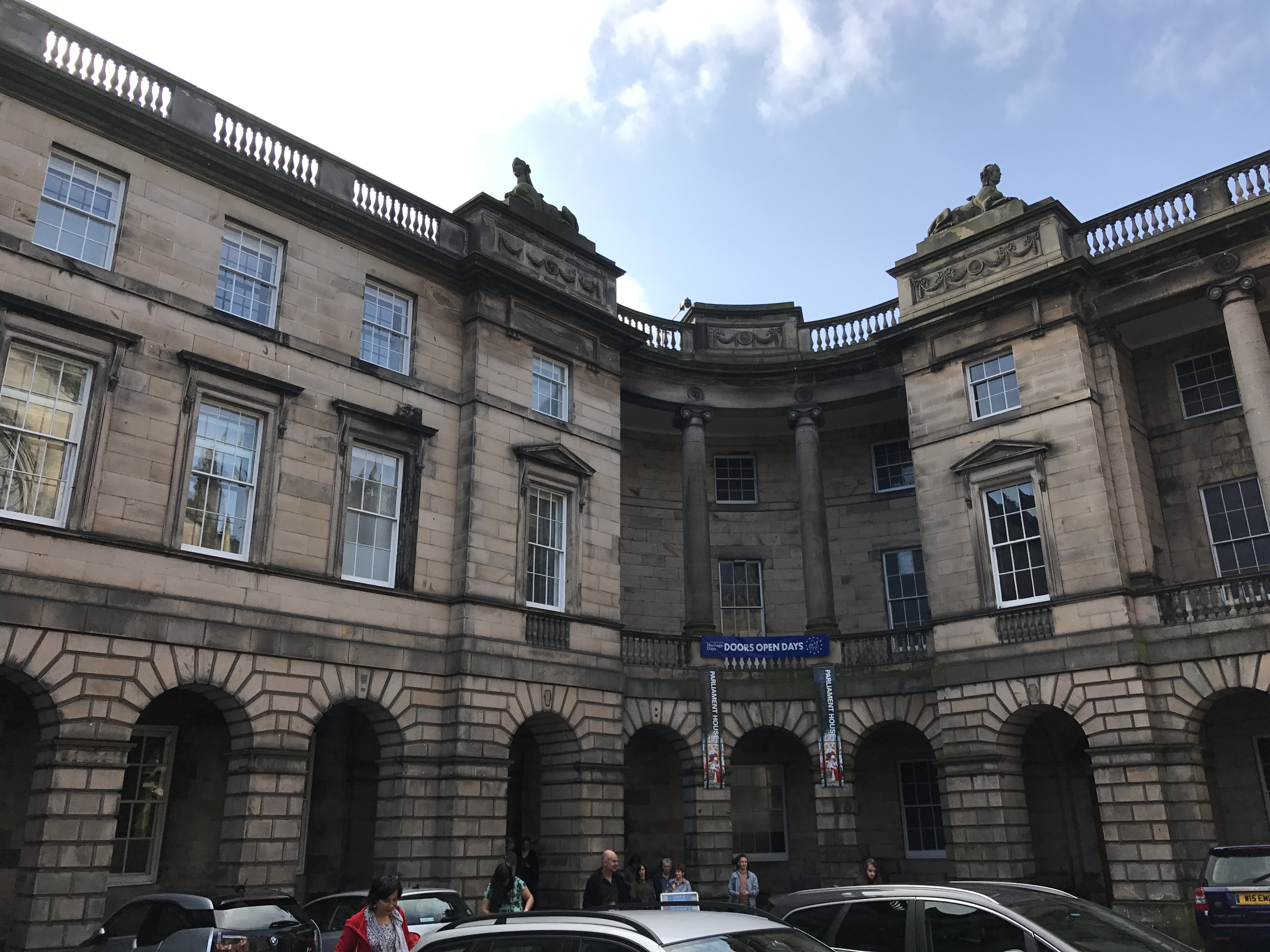
Advocate's Library, Parliament House

With the Acts of Union 1707, the Parliament of Scotland was dissolved, and Parliament House ceased to be used for its main original purpose. From then onwards the building was primarily used by the courts as the seat of the Court of Session, the High Court of Justiciary, the Admiralty Court, and the Court of Exchequer. The national records of Scotland were moved from the Laigh Hall to General Register House in 1789. From 1707 until 1844 the Lords Ordinary of the Court of Session sat in Parliament Hall, and as their courtroom the hall came to be known as the Outer House, while the judges of the Court of Session hearing appellate cases sat in one of the ground floor chambers in the south-east Treasury wing, which came to be known as the Inner House. Until the 19th century Parliament Hall was also, as the property of the town council, the main public hall of Edinburgh for the hosting of civic receptions. During music festivals held in 1815, 1819, and 1824, the hall hosted performances of George Frideric Handel's Messiah and Joseph Haydn's The Creation. A civic banquet was also held there during the visit of George IV to Edinburgh in 1822.

The early 19th century saw a series of changes. A new Court of Exchequer was built, and in 1808, when the Inner house was split into two divisions, the new courtroom for the Second Division was created to the west of Parliament Hall. Two courtrooms for Lords Ordinary were added south of Parliament Hall in 1818-20. By 1830 the east range, the Court of Exchequer, was complete and by 1838 the south range was built providing courtrooms for the High Court of Justiciary, replacing the 17th century Inner House courtroom in the Treasury wing with two new Inner House courts. The Lords Ordinary finally moved out of Parliament Hall in 1844 when four new courtrooms were built on the site of the 1818-20 courts. The bank building of 1827-29 on the east of the site was incorporated into the courts in 1881-6. In 1907-09 the Outer House Courts due south of Parliament Hall were remodelled and extended.

Today, Parliament House is the seat of the Court of Session, the highest civil court of Scotland. Most of the work of the High Court of Justiciary, the supreme criminal court of Scotland, takes place in the Justiciary Building in the Lawnmarket. Parliament Hall now remains open as a meeting place for lawyers.

== Ownership and renovations ==
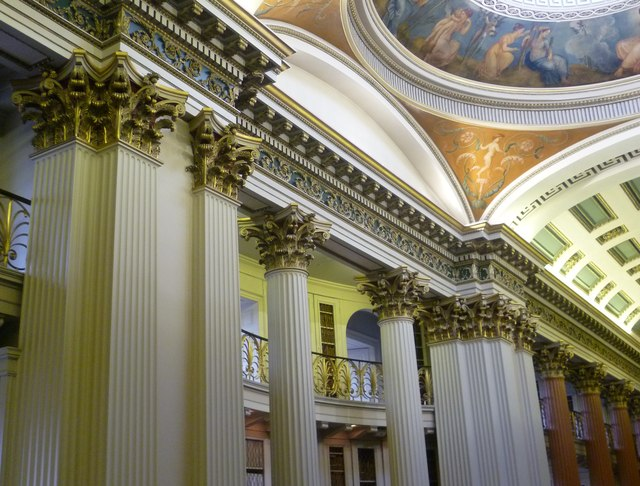
Roof detailing in the Signet Library

Currently, Parliament House is owned by Scottish Courts Service and Faculty of Advocates. In 2015, a debate began around "giving" the building back to the City of Edinburgh and its people following confirmation that the building was "gifted" to the Scottish Courts Service after City of Edinburgh Council raised questions with the Scottish Government who owned the building. Cllr Burns from City of Edinburgh Council said that he wished to "formulate the process" of the building being returned to the City of Edinburgh, following the announcement by the first minister of Scotland, Nicola Sturgeon, that the building would not be handed back, in which she said that the "title to Parliament Hall was taken by Scottish ministers in good faith and that was done with the full knowledge and consent of the council", further clarifying that the "Scottish Courts Service and Faculty of Advocates now have good title to that property".

The building was previously part of the Common Good Fund of Edinburgh until 2006 when a "legal blunder" by the City of Edinburgh Council meant that the Scottish Government took “voluntary registration” of the title deeds of Parliament House.

By 1899, the facade of the building had changed considerably and was styled in a neoclassical frontage style. A number of new courtrooms was created in the building during the 1990s in the southeastern section of Parliament House. In 2004, the original lintel from Parliament House which was removed during renovation works in the 1800s was installed above the debating chamber of the new Scottish Parliament building located at Holyrood. In 2004, a £60 million programme of refurbishment work began within Parliament House and its multiple complex of buildings. In order for the works to commence, the Scottish Government decided to record a title of the building by way of a voluntary registration in the Land Registers of Scotland, however, the Keeper of the Registers of Scotland raised concerns as to whether Scottish Ministers actually owned the building in order to do so, and advised them to liaise with the City of Edinburgh Council who were originally thought to be the owners. Despite questions over the legal ownership of the building, work commenced and was finally completed in 2013.

== Features ==
=== Architecture ===
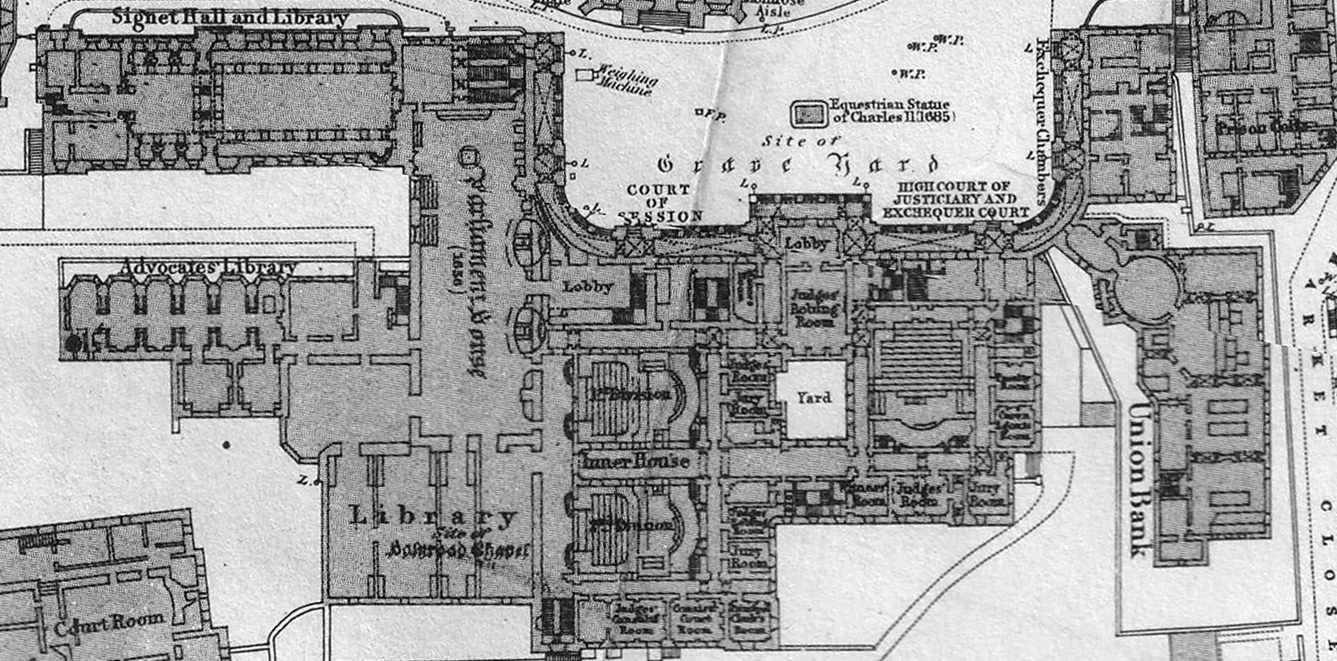
1877 plan of the complex, including Parliament Hall, the Signet Library and the Advocates' Library

Robert Reid designed the exterior of the building (1803-10 and 1827-38). He gave the whole complex an overall unified Classical façade on the north side. This Parliament Square façade was strongly influenced by the Adam style, in particular their unexecuted designs for the quadrants of the Old College of the University of Edinburgh. The façade is a Classical, 3-storey, 31-bay, symmetrical U-plan, with a central advanced 5-bay pedimented hexastyle portico, a cornice and balustraded parapet with decorative panels inset, some surmounted by stone sphinxes.

The Advocates Library was founded in 1682, and is located in the William Henry Playfair-designed building (1830) to the west of the south end of Parliament Hall. It remains a heavily used legal resource. As well as collecting legal works, it was also a deposit library, and in 1925 the non-legal books in their collection were given to the new National Library of Scotland, which is located next to the library, on George IV Bridge.

To the west of the north end of Parliament Hall is the Signet Library. It is a private library, funded by members of the Society of Writers to Her Majesty's Signet, who are generally practising solicitors. Construction began in 1810 to a design by Robert Reid, and it presents a classical front to Parliament Square.

=== Laigh Hall ===
Beneath Parliament Hall is the Laigh Hall, the original use of which remains unclear, although it may have been used for subsidiary parliamentary meetings or perhaps as a storage space. In 1662 the legal registers of Scotland were removed from the 'register house' in Edinburgh Castle to the Laigh Hall, as were parliamentary and other records in 1689. The national records would continue to be stored in the Laigh Hall until 1789. Edinburgh's infamous Maiden guillotine was also stored in the Laigh Hall at one point.

=== Treasury ===
The two-storey south-east wing, known as the Treasury, contained an entrance lobby on the ground floor, with the Court of Session occupying the two ground floor chambers. The upper floor contained the Treasury Room (used by the Treasurer and the later Treasury Board), the Council Chamber (used by the Privy Council), and the Exchequer Room (used by the Court of Exchequer). During parliamentary sessions all of these rooms would have been used by committees.

== See also ==
- Courts of Scotland
- Middlesex Guildhall
- Royal Courts of Justice, Belfast
- Royal Courts of Justice, London
- Scots law

| Preceded by St Giles Cathedral | Home of the Parliament of Scotland; 1639–1707 | Succeeded by General Assembly Hall of the Church of Scotland |
