= Oklahoma Courts of Appeal =

There are two Courts of Appeal in the U.S. state of Oklahoma:

- Oklahoma Court of Civil Appeals hears appeals in civil cases. Decisions from this court may be further appealed to the Oklahoma Supreme Court.
- Oklahoma Court of Criminal Appeals hears appeals in criminal cases. This is the highest court for criminal cases in Oklahoma; decisions from this court can only be appealed to the Supreme Court of the United States.
