= Kienapple v R =

Judgement of the Supreme Court of Canada

- Supreme Court of Canada

Hearing: Judgment: 1974
- Full case name: John Edward Kienapple v Her Majesty the Queen

Court membership
- Chief Justice: Gérald Fauteux; Puisne Justices: Douglas Abbott, Ronald Martland, Wilfred Judson, Roland Ritchie, Emmett Hall, Wishart Spence, Louis-Philippe Pigeon, Bora Laskin

Reasons given
- Majority: Laskin, joined by Judson, Spence, Pigeon, and Dickson
- Dissent: Ritchie, joined by Fauteux, Abbott, and Martland

Kienapple v R, [1975] 1 S.C.R. 729 is a leading decision of the Supreme Court of Canada that established the rule against multiple convictions known as the Kienapple principle. Justice Bora Laskin, for the court, held that an accused cannot be convicted of two offences where they both arise out of substantially the same facts.

John Edward Kienapple was charged with rape and unlawful sexual intercourse with a female under 14 years of age. At trial he was convicted on both charges. On appeal to the Supreme Court his conviction for unlawful sexual intercourse was overturned.

== See also ==
- R v Prince
- Res judicata
