= Justice of Appeal =

Justice of Appeal may refer to:

- Justice of Appeal (Fiji), a judge of Fiji's Court of Appeal or Supreme Court
- Justice of Appeal (Hong Kong), a judge of the Court of Appeal of the High Court of Hong Kong

== See also ==
- Judge of Appeal, in the Isle of Man High Court
- Lords of Appeal in Ordinary, now Justices of the Supreme Court of the United Kingdom
- Court of Appeal judge (England and Wales)
