= Appeal Isimirie =

Nigerian taekwondo practitioner

Personal information
- Full name: Appeal Isimirie
- Nationality: Nigeria
- Born: Nigeria

Sport
- Sport: Taekwondo
- Event: 59 kg
Medal record
Women's taekwondo
Representing Nigeria
African Taekwondo Championships
| Silver medal – second place | 2003 African Judo Championships | 59 kg |

Appeal Isimirie is a Nigerian taekwondo practitioner who competes in the women's senior category. She won a bronze medal at the 2003 African Taekwondo Championships in the –59 kg category.

== Sports career ==
At the 2003 African Taekwondo Championships held in Abuja, Nigeria. Appeal Isimirie competed and won a silver medal in the 59 kg event.
