= Parliament Square (disambiguation) =

Parliament Square is a square in the City of Westminster, London, England.

It may also refer to:

- Parliament Square, Berne, Switzerland
- Parliament Square, Dublin, Ireland; part of Trinity College, Dublin
- Parliament Square, Edinburgh, Scotland
- Parliament Square, Hobart, Australia
- Parliament Square, Melbourne, Australia
- Parliament Square, Nassau, The Bahamas
- Parliament Square, Ramsey, Isle of Man
- Parliament Square, Toronto, Canada

== See also ==
- Parliament House (disambiguation)
- National Assembly Square (disambiguation)
