= Parliament House Motor Inn =

American hotel chain

The Parliament House Motor Inn chain was started by Kansas City, Missouri investors Ned Eddy and his sons Ned, Jr. and James. They started in the food and beverages business running the successful Eddy’s Restaurant in Kansas City, Missouri. They gave the Parliament House properties an English royalty theme with the slogan, "Built for the House of Lords... priced for the House of Commons." Their goal was a nine city chain by 1964. They never made their goal and filed for bankruptcy on June 8, 1965 when they claimed to operate 8 properties. They listed liabilities of $5 million in the court filings.

== Locations ==
=== Orlando, Florida ===
The 120 room lakeside motor inn in Orlando, Florida was the first motor inn in the chain and was located at 410 North Orange Blossom Trail. Parliament House opened on Sunday February 11, 1962. The opening was televised by local station WLOF Channel 9, now WFTV. It was built on Orlando’s Rock Lake by Hodes and Cumming Construction, the same company that built the iconic Kanes furniture store on West Colonial Drive. The architect was Alan Berman. The Baron of Beef Restaurant and adjacent conference center opened a few months later on June 12, 1962. Ned Eddy, Jr acted as manager and his brother James (Jimmy) Eddy was manager of the cocktail lounge.

The Parliament House Motor Inn was popular spot for meetings and weddings. It was used by nearby Tupperware World Headquarters for meetings, was the site of numerous Florida Voters League meetings, and the NAACP legislative conference.

In 1972, Jim Ritter, the assistant manager, was quoted as saying “May’s always been dead around here and 1972 is no different, but we expect to be booked full two weeks ahead all summer” referring to the recent opening of Walt Disney World and the expected influx of visitors. The influx of visitors never happened as thousands of competing hotel and motel rooms were built on International Drive and along Kissimmee’s Highway 192. The Parliament House began to cater to the seedier clientele of prostitutes who settled into the declining area of Orange Blossom Trail.

By 1975 the motor inn was near bankruptcy when the owners were approached by Bill Miller and Michael Hodge who purchased the Parliament House for $648,000 on March 27, 1975 and transformed the location into a gay and lesbian resort, now the Parliament House Resort.

Unfortunately the Parliament House Motor Inn in Orlando Florida is the last Parliament House property to close under the original name. Years of mismanagement, declining sales and bankruptcies forced the location to close on November 2, 2020. Demolition began on January 4, 2021, lasting around 6 weeks before the entire property was completely demolished. The city of Orlando has succeeded in saving the iconic sign, which will be on display in the history museum.

=== Birmingham, Alabama ===
Parliament House Hotel was an 11-story, 237-room hotel which occupied the west side of 20th Street South between 4th and 5th Avenues (420 South 20th Street) from 1964 to 2008 in Birmingham, Alabama. It opened for guests on January 2, 1964. It featured the Baron of Beef Restaurant, Sidewalk Cafe, Cork Room, and Once a Knight Lounge.

Ned Eddy and his sons Ned, Jr and James of Kansas City purchased the hotel while it was under construction as the crown of their Parliament House chain. Guest room telephones were among the first to feature direct room-to-room calling and a flashing message light.

It was imploded on February 17, 2008.

=== Clearwater Beach, Florida ===
The first 120 room beach front Parliament House in Clearwater Beach, Florida opened in 1963 adjacent to the newly built Clearwater Pass toll bridge, but fell into receivership and became a Hilton hotel franchise on December 11, 1965. The manager was a gentleman named William P. Wright. It was built at a cost of $900,000 and also included the popular Baron of Beef restaurant run by head chef Otto Schmidt (from Miami Beach) and featured Kansas City Sirloins. The adjacent Cork Room lounge featured nightly entertainment. It eventually became known as the Holiday Inn Sunspree Resort, which was demolished along with the adjacent Adam’s Mark hotel to make way for a condominium project in 2007.

=== Baton Rouge, Louisiana ===
The Parliament House Lake Shore Baton Rouge opened in 1963 and included 321 rooms and the Arcadia dining room which was well known to the cities locals. It was later known as “Inn on the Lake”, “Safari Inn”, and “Lakeside Motor Inn”. Its address was 1575 Riverside North shown in legal documents but efforts have been unable to locate this exact address. There are no known photographs of this location. Other possible names are Governor's Inn, the Lakeshore Statler-Hilton Inn, the White House Inn and finally the Inn on the Lake. Inn on The Lake, Inc., 1575 N 3Rd St Baton Rouge, LA 70802.

=== Augusta, Georgia ===
Construction of the 120 room Augusta, Georgia Parliament House started on December 16, 1963 on Broad and Ellis Street. It featured a 300-person banquet hall, lounge, and heated swimming pool. It was designed by Fress Camner Associates in Miami, Florida. There are no known photographs of this location.

=== Atlanta, Georgia ===
That Atlanta, Georgia Parliament House later became the Ramada Inn on 70 John Wesley Dobbs Avenue. It was also known as the Atlanta Palms resort and E Hotel. It was gutted and then used as part of an 18 story Georgia State University dorm tower in 2013. It is now known as One12 Courtland.

=== Panama City, Florida ===
The 100 room Parliament Inn was located at Sunnyside Beach, 20450 W. Hwy 98. It featured the M'Lord restaurant and Gaucho lounge.
