= Vinnytsia Administrative Court of Appeal =

Vinnitsa Administrative Court Of Appeal
- Established: 2010
- Jurisdiction: Vinnytsia region, Khmelnytsky region, Chernivtsi
- Location: Bratslavska Street, 14, Vinnytsia, Ukraine, "www.vaas.gov.ua".
- Composition method: administrative court
- Website: www.vaas.gov.ua

Chairman of Vinnytsia Administrative Court of Appeal
- Currently: Kuzmyshyn Vitaliy M.

Vinnytsia Administrative Court of Appeal is the Court of Appeal for the Oblasts of Vinnytsia, Khmelnitsky and Chernivtsi. It is located in Vinnytsia.

== History ==
According to the Decree of the President of Ukraine on October 16, 2008 No. 941/2008 “On improving the network of administrative courts” Vinnytsia Administrative Court of Appeal was created with 42 judges.

According to the Decree of the President of Ukraine on August 12, 2010 No. 812/2010 “On Amendments to the Decree of the President of Ukraine of November 16, 2004 № 1417” Cherkasy was excluded from the jurisdiction of Vinnytsia Administrative Court of Appeal.

According to the Decision of the High Council of Justice on December 20, 2010, Vitaliy M. Kuzmyshyn was appointed Chairman of Vinnytsia Administrative Court of Appeal. At that time Kuzmyshyn headed Vinnytsia District Administrative Court.

The appointment and election of judges happened in several stages. First judges of Vinnytsia Administrative Court of Appeal were elected according to the Decree of Verkhovna Rada of Ukraine “On election of judges” on October 7, 2010 No. 2595-VI. They were:

- Alimenko Volodymyr O.
- Borovytskii Aleksandr A.
- Zalimskii Ihor H.
- Kuzmyshyn Vitaliy M.
- Kurko Oleg P.
- Levanchyk Andriy O.

In October and November 2010 according to the resolutions of the Verkhovna Rada of Ukraine Drachuk Tetiana O.and Smilianets Eduard S. were elected to the Court. According to the Decree of the President of Ukraine “On appointment of judges” on November 19, 2010 № 1046/2010 the newly appointed judges were:

- Hontaruk Viktor M.
- Melnyk-Tomenko Zhanna M.
- Sapaliova Tetiana V.
- Storchak Volodymyr J.

In December 2010 according to the resolutions of the Verkhovna Rada of Ukraine “On appointment of judges” on December 2, 2010 No. 2763-VI and on December 23, 2010 No. 2871-VI the newly appointed judges were:

- Holota Lyudmyla O.
- Kozhuhar Maria S.
- Sovhyra Dmytro I.

On February 15, 2011 The High Council of Justice appointed Hontaruk Viktor M. and Melnyk-Tomenko Zhanna M. as Vice-Chairs.

According to the Decision of Vinnytsia Regional Council No. 1072 on November 30, 2010 the building on Soborna Street, 48 / Kozytskogo Street, 34 was leased the Court.

Pursuant to paragraph 4, Section VII “Final and Transitional Provisions”of the Code of Administrative Procedure of Ukraine the Court was declared open by State Judicial Administration of Ukraine.

The Court began operation on December 15, 2010. Celebrations were held on April 12, 2011. Applying Article 115 of Law of Ukraine “On Judiciary and Status of Judges” and following a meeting of the judges, two chambers processing separate categories of cases were established. Zalimskiy Ihor H. and Storchak Volodymyr J. were appointed as Secretaries of the chambers.

== Guidance ==
Photo	Position	First and last name
	Chairman of Vinnytsia Administrative Court of Appeal	Kuzmyshyn Vitaliy M.
	Vice-Chairman of Vinnytsia Administrative Court of Appeal	Hontaruk Viktor M.
	Vice-Chairwoman of Vinnytsia Administrative Court of Appeal	Melnyk-Tomenko Zhanna M.
