= Parliament House (hotel) =

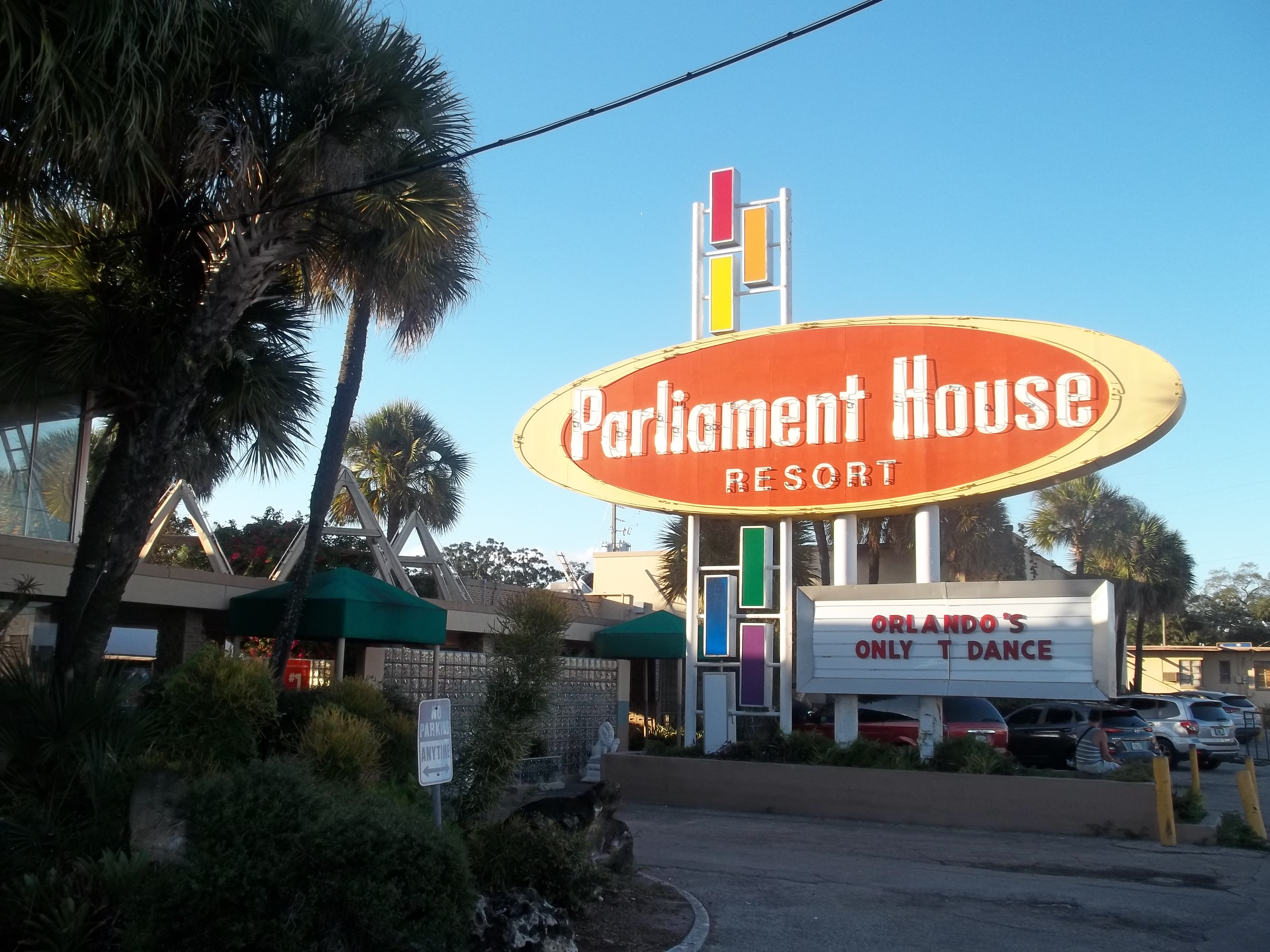

General information
- Type: Gay resort
- Location: 410 N. Orange Blossom Trl., Orlando, Florida, United States
- Coordinates: 28.548140399465282°N 81.39738847946768°W
- Opened: 1975
- Closed: 2020

Technical details
- Grounds: 10,000 square feet

Other information
- Number of rooms: 112

Website
- www.parliamenthouse.com

Parliament House was a gay resort on the Orange Blossom Trail in Orlando, Florida, United States, that included several bars and hosted performances such as drag shows. There were 112 rooms in the complex, which encompassed 10,000 square feet, including an outdoor stage, a swimming pool, and a dance floor. The resort was established in 1975, and eventually became the best-known gay resort in Orlando. In 2006, the resort expanded to include a timeshare. In 2010, Parliament House was in danger of foreclosure. In 2012, Kenneth Creuzer, a 48-year-old HIV-positive man, was arrested on charges relating to his having allegedly raped a man at Parliament House. Alison Arngrim, who portrayed Nellie Oleson on the television series Little House on the Prairie, performed a one-person show called "Confessions of a Prairie Bitch" at Parliament House in 2013. On July 25, 2014, the resort filed for Chapter 11 bankruptcy, with $12.4 million in debts and nearly $4 million in assets. In February 2015, a fourteen-million-dollar debt relief plan was approved by the relevant parties. In 2019, NewNowNext declared Parliament House the most popular gay bar in the United States.

Parliament House Resort was the only remaining motor inn from the Parliament House Motor Inn chain. It closed on November 2, 2020, and demolition began on the complex on January 4, 2021.

== Decline and closure ==
Parliament House saw a decline in condition, service and patronage in its final years. As of March 2019, the property was listed for sale at $16.5 million. On October 28, 2020, Parliament House's owners announced that they had been unable to secure financing to renovate the existing venue and that it would close on November 2. They further stated: "In the coming weeks, we'll reveal our plans for the immediate future.... This is by no means goodbye. We promise to keep you updated about our grand re-opening."

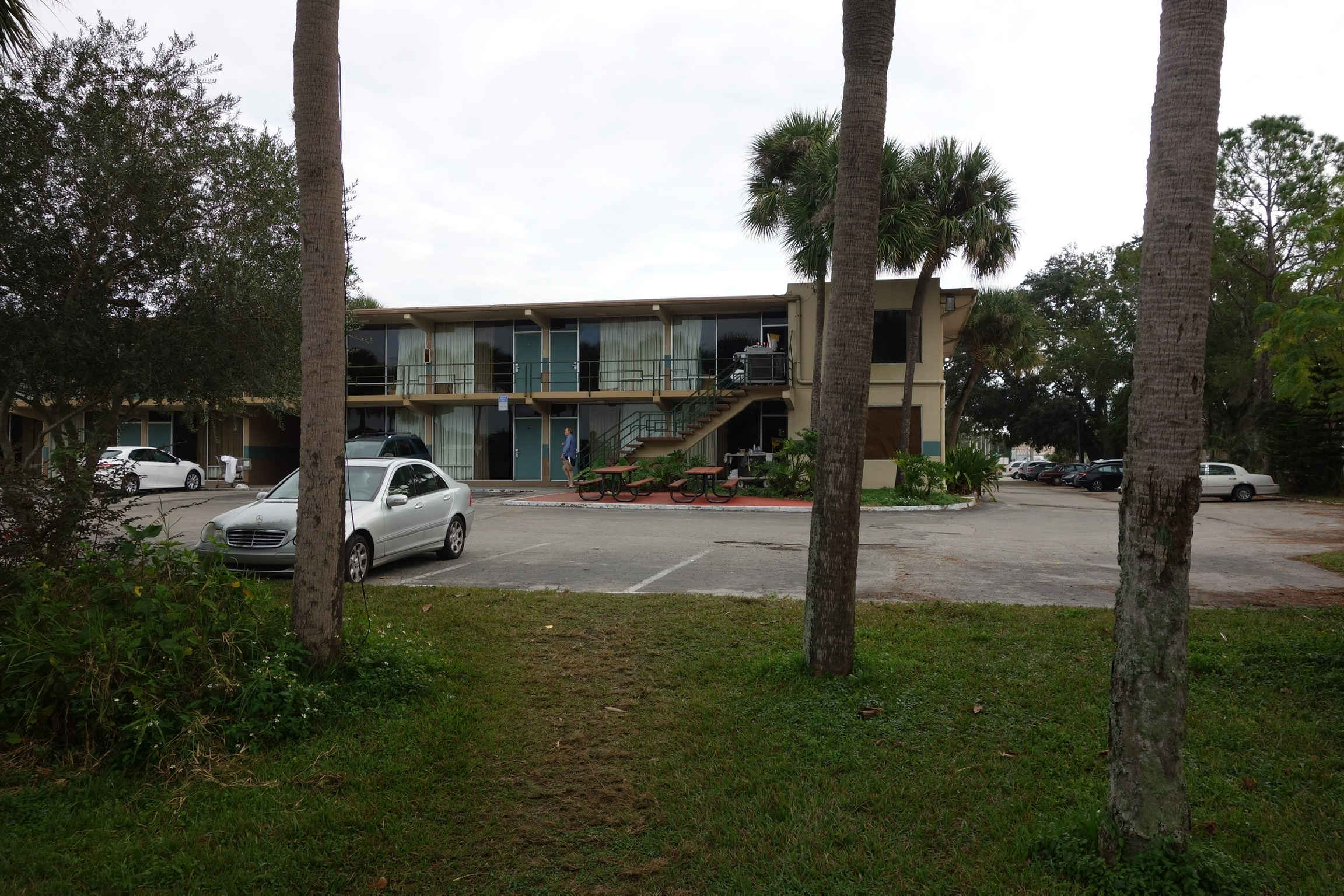
Parliament House seen from the lake side in 2019. The place closed in 2020 and was demolished in 2021.

== Notable performers ==
- Courtney Act
- Axel Andrews
- Roxxxy Andrews
- Alison Arngrim
- Claudja Barry
- Jackie Beat
- Andy Bell
- Willam Belli
- BenDeLaCreme
- Sandra Bernhard
- Bob the Drag Queen
- Pandora Boxx
- Jocelyn Brown
- Belinda Carlisle
- Carmen Carrera
- Cazwell
- Violet Chachki
- Charo
- Coko
- Company B
- Deborah Cox
- Frenchie Davis
- Taylor Dayne
- Bianca Del Rio
- Adore Delano
- Kat Deluna
- Curves Diamond
- Alyssa Edwards
- Estelle
- Laganja Estranja
- Nina Flowers
- The Footlight Players
- Gloria Gaynor
- Macy Gray
- Debbie Gibson
- Keri Hilson
- Jennifer Holliday
- Loleatta Holloway
- Thelma Houston
- Ivy Queen
- Erika Jayne
- France Joli
- Leslie Jordan
- Katya
- Kelis
- Chaka Khan
- Khia
- Eartha Kitt
- Kristine W
- Lady Bunny
- Cyndi Lauper
- NeNe Leakes
- DJ Brianna Lee
- Paul Lekakis
- Amanda Lepore
- Lil' Kim
- Lil' Mo
- Lisa Lisa
- Kylie Sonique Love
- Manila Luzon
- Ts Madison
- Martika
- Trixie Mattel
- Jonny McGovern
- Varla Jean Merman
- Chad Michaels
- Ginger Minj
- Jinkx Monsoon
- Mýa
- Sharon Needles
- Paul Parker
- Miss Coco Peru
- Prince Poppycock
- Randy Rainbow
- LeAnn Rimes
- Vicki Sue Robinson
- Latrice Royale
- RuPaul
- Salt-N-Pepa
- Tyra Sanchez
- Shangela
- Jordin Sparks
- Ms. Darcel Stevens
- Byron Stingily
- Rip Taylor
- Alaska Thunderfuck
- Tiffany
- Trina
- The Village People
- Sherry Vine
- Michelle Visage
- Martha Wash
- Crystal Waters
- The Weather Girls
- Suzanne Westenhoefer
- Betty Who
- Wilson Phillips

== Bibliography ==
- Taylor, Wendy (2003). Orlando & Central Florida. Lonely Planet. p. 82. ISBN 1740597079.
