= Lord of Appeal =

Lord of Appeal may refer to:

- Lords of Appeal in Ordinary (also known as Law Lords), members of the House of Lords formerly appointed under the Appellate Jurisdiction Act 1876 to exercise its judicial functions
- Lords of Appeal, members of the House of Lords who exercised its judicial functions, but who were not appointed under the Appellate Jurisdiction Act 1876
- Lord Justice of Appeal, a judge of the Court of Appeal of England and Wales
- Lords Appellant, a group of nobles in the reign of King Richard II who sought to impeach several of the King's favourites in the 1380s
