= Appeals from the Crown Court =

This article concerns appeals against decisions of the Crown Court of England and Wales. The majority of appeals against Crown Court decisions are heard by the Criminal Division of the Court of Appeal.

== Jurisdiction of the Court of Appeal and divisional courts ==
The Court of Appeal has jurisdiction to hear the following appeals:

| Following trial on indictment | Appeals against conviction on indictment | Appeals against conviction on indictment may only be made with a certificate of the trial judge or leave of the Court of Appeal. An application for leave must be submitted with written reasons within 28 days of conviction. If leave is refused by a single judge on the papers, the applicant has a right to have the matter determined by a two-judge or full court. An applicant may normally only appeal once against conviction, even if new evidence has arisen. The Court of Appeal will quash the conviction if it was unsafe. A conviction may be unsafe despite the applicant having pleaded guilty where: the plea was equivocal or mistaken or; the effect of an incorrect ruling of law on admitted facts was to leave an accused with no legal escape from a verdict of guilty on those facts. However, But a conviction would not normally be unsafe where an accused is influenced to change his plea to guilty because he recognizes that, as a result of a ruling to admit strong evidence against him, his case on the facts is hopeless.; A conviction may be unsafe even if the appellant admitted his guilt at trial if an application that there was no case to answer was wrongly refused. A conviction obtained on this basis is an abuse of process. Following a successful appeal, the appellant must be acquitted. The Court of Appeal may order a retrial where the interests of justice so require. The appellant may only be retried for an offence of which he could have been convicted in the original trial. The defendant must be arraigned within two months unless the Court of Appeal orders otherwise. The Court of Appeal may substitute for the verdict found by the jury a verdict of guilty of another offence, if the jury could have found him guilty of that offence and it appears to the Court of Appeal that the jury must have been satisfied of facts which proved him guilty of the other offence. Where the Court of Appeal substitutes a conviction for another offence or quashes some of the convictions but not others, the Court of Appeal may sentence the offender. |
| Following trial on indictment | Appeals against sentence following conviction on indictment | A person convicted in the Crown Court may only appeal against sentence with a certificate of the trial judge or leave of the Court of Appeal. For this purpose, sentence includes any order made by a court when dealing with the offender. The Court of Appeal may quash any sentence which is the subject of the appeal and in place of it pass such sentence as they think is appropriate, so long as taking the case as a whole, the appellant is not dealt with more severely by the Court of Appeal than by the Crown Court. |
| Following trial on indictment | Appeals against findings of unfitness to plead | |
| Following trial on indictment | Appeals against verdicts of not guilty by reason of insanity | |
| Following trial in a magistrates' court | Appeals against sentence passed by the Crown Court following committal for sentence by the magistrates' court. | |
| Serious fraud cases | Appeals against rulings made at preparatory hearings in cases of serious fraud. | |
| References by the Attorney-General | Opinions on points of law following the acquittal of a defendant. | |
| References by the Attorney-General | Appeals against unduly lenient sentences in relation to offences triable only on indictment, and in relation to certain specified either way offences. | |
| References by the Criminal Cases Review Commission | Appeals | |
| No valid trial at all | Writ of venire de novo | The following are categories of cases where the trial is a nullity and thus a writ of venire de novo may be granted: where there was an error in the plea of the defendant or doubt about what the true plea was; where defendants have been improperly joined; where there was failure to take the verdict of the jury on a change of plea from not guilty to guilt; where there was an irregularity in the committal proceedings; where the wrong person takes the place of a juror; where there was a denial of the right to challenge a juror; where the judge was not qualified to act as a judge in the matter; and; where the verdict of the jury was so ambiguous or ill-expressed that no judgment could properly be given on it. |

A divisional court of the King's Bench Division of the High Court has jurisdiction to hear appeals by way of case stated and applications for judicial review, where the Crown Court is conducting an appeal against a decision of a magistrates' court.

== Appeals to the Court of Appeal ==
=== Composition of the court ===
| Matters which must be dealt with by the full court The full court is a court comprising an uneven number of judges (at least 3), which gives judgment by majority. | Matters which may be dealt with by two judges If the judges cannot agree, the matter must be reheard before a full court. | Matters which may be dealt with by a single judge |
|---|---|---|
| * an appeal against conviction; an appeal against a verdict of not guilty by reason of insanity; an appeal against a finding of unfitness to plead; a review of sentencing following a reference by the Attorney General; an application for leave to appeal to the Supreme Court; and; refusing an application for leave to appeal where the application has been refused by a single judge. | Any matter which need not be dealt with by the full court, including: an appeal against sentence brought by the defendant; refusing an application for leave to appeal where the application has been refused by a single judge; granting leave to appeal to the Court of Appeal; dealing with all interlocutory applications; and; directing that the Criminal Cases Review Commission investigate a particular issue. | * granting leave to appeal; extending the time period for making an application for leave to appeal; directing that an appellant in custody may be present at the proceedings (where he does not automatically have that right); ordering a witness to attend for examination; granting, revoking or varying the conditions of an appellant's bail; ordering that the time in which the appellant was in custody pending appeal should not count towards the satisfaction of his sentence (on the ground that the appeal was frivolous or vexatious, meaning there was no realistic prospect of success; directing that evidence should be received; directing that documentary or real evidence should be produced or that a witness should be examined; directing that the victim of a sexual offence should not be anonymous; ordering the payment of costs; giving leave for any person to be present at an appeal; and; suspending a person's driving disqualification. |

== Bibliography ==
Hooper; Ormerod; Murphy, eds. (2008). "Section F19 Inferences from Silence and the Non-production of Evidence". Blackstone's Criminal Practice. Oxford. ISBN 978-0-19-922814-0.
