= Houses of Parliament (disambiguation) =

The Houses of Parliament is the Palace of Westminster, the meeting place of the House of Commons and the House of Lords of the United Kingdom.

Houses of Parliament may also refer to:

- Houses of Parliament, Cape Town, the seat of the Parliament of South Africa
- Chambers of parliament, the two houses of bicameral legislatures
- Houses of Parliament (Monet series), a series of paintings by Claude Monet of the Palace of Westminster
- Irish Houses of Parliament, seat of the former Parliament of Ireland
- Malaysian Houses of Parliament, seat of the Parliament of Malaysia
- 1974 Houses of Parliament bombing, IRA attack in London, England in 1974
- HP Sauce, a bottled British brown sauce, named after the Houses of Parliament

== See also ==
- Parliament House (disambiguation)
- Legislative building
