= Court of Appeal of Monaco =

Court in Monaco

The Court of Appeal (French: Cour d'appel) is a court of the second level of the judiciary in civil, criminal, commercial and administrative matters in the Principality of Monaco. The Court of Appeal judges on appeals of judgments delivered by the Court of First Instance. The Court of Appeal has a remarkable position in the Monegasque justice system due to its regulatory function, which is both judicial and legal. On the legal side, many of the Court’s judgments constitute law references establishing the Monegasque State of Law. On the judicial side, the Court contributes to guaranteeing that the institution of justice will comply both with law and professional ethics.

The Court was established in 1965 and is composed of a President, a Vice President and a maximum of two advisers.

== Members ==
As of 2021 Court of Appeal consists of the following members:

- President - Brigitte Grinda-Gambarini
- Vice President - Muriel Dorato-Chicouras
- Advisers:
  - Sébastien Biancheri
  - Françoise Carracha
  - Sandrine Lefebvre
  - Catherine Levy
  - Claire Gillois-Ghera
