= Court of Criminal Appeal (England and Wales) =

Former court of England and Wales

Criminal Appeal Act 1907 (Note: Section 23(1).)
- Act of Parliament
- Parliament of the United Kingdom
- Long title: An Act to establish a Court of Criminal Appeal and to amend the Law relating to Appeals in Criminal Cases.
- Citation: 7 Edw. 7. c. 23
- Territorial extent: England and Wales (Note: Section 23(2).)

Dates
- Royal assent: 28 August 1907
- Commencement: 18 April 1908 (Note: Section 23(3).)
- Repealed: 1 September 1968
Other legislation
Amends	Treason Act 1695; Crown Cases Act 1848; Supreme Court of Judicature Act 1875; Supreme Court of Judicature Act 1881
Amended by	Criminal Justice Act 1948; Costs in Criminal Cases Act 1952; Mental Health Act 1959; Criminal Law Act 1967
Repealed by	Criminal Appeal Act 1968

Status: Repealed

Text of statute as originally enacted

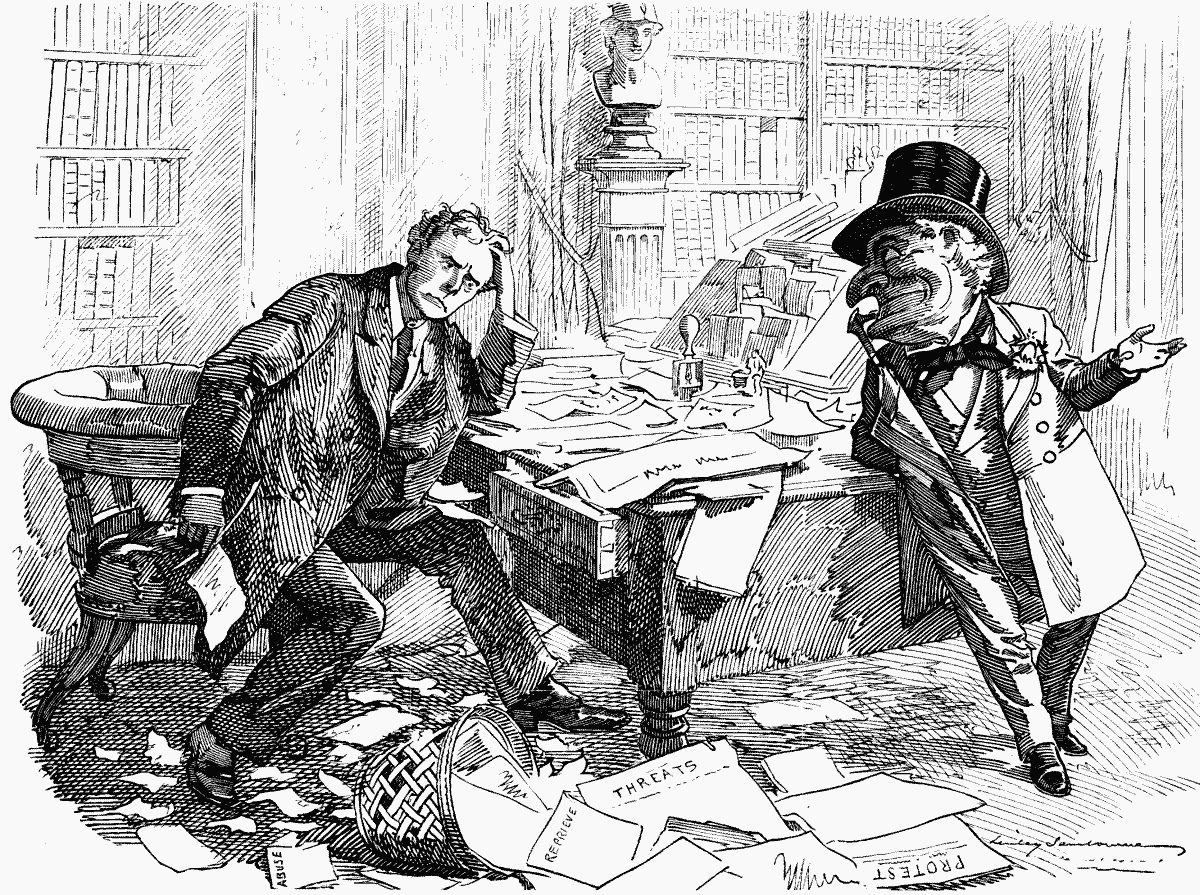
Home Sec. "Oh, dear! Oh, dear! Why leave it to Me!" Mr. P. (sympathetically). "Why, indeed? But I don't see any Help for it till we get a Court of Criminal Appeal." Punch magazine cartoon from 1890, noting then current discussion as to the need to relieve the Home Secretary, Henry Matthews, of the responsibility for determining criminal case appeals.

Law book with the rules of court and forms (1908)

The Court of Criminal Appeal was an English appellate court for criminal cases established by the Criminal Appeal Act 1907 (7 Edw. 7. c. 23). It superseded the Court for Crown Cases Reserved to which referral had been solely discretionary and which could only consider points of law. Throughout the nineteenth century, there had been opposition from lawyers, judges and the Home Office against such an appeal court with collateral right of appeal. However, disquiet over the convictions of Adolf Beck and George Edalji led to the concession of a new court that could hear matters of law, fact or mixed law and fact.

Though the court was staffed with the judges who had shown such hostility (consisting of the Lord Chief Justice and eight judges of the Queen's Bench Division of the High Court), it had a restraining effect on the excesses of prosecutors. During the period 1909–1912, there was an average of 450 annual applications for leave to appeal of which an average of 170 were granted. Of that 170, conviction was quashed in 20 percent of cases and sentence varied in another 22 per cent. Rulings of the court included limitation of the lower courts' ability simultaneously to try multiple defendants, multiple indictments and disparate counts within an indictment. The ability of the prosecution to introduce further evidence after the close of the prosecution case was curtailed as were several prejudicial practices with a defendant's previous criminal record. Further, trial judges' ability to invade the jury's role as trier of fact came under scrutiny, as did the practice of insisting that the defence proceed even in the case of an inadequate prima facie case by the prosecution. The Court also did much to refine and systematise the law of evidence.

On 1 October 1966, the Court of Criminal Appeal was superseded by the Criminal Division of the Court of Appeal of England and Wales.

== Subsequent developments ==
Section 13 of the act was repealed by section 18(1) of, and the schedule to, the Costs in Criminal Cases Act 1952 (15 & 16 Geo. 6 & 1 Eliz. 2. c. 48), which came into force on 1 January 1953.

The whole act was repealed by section 54 of, and schedule 7 to, the Criminal Appeal Act 1968, which came into force on 1 September 1968.

== Bibliography ==
- Cornish, W.; Clarke, G. (1989). Law and Society in England 1750-1950. London: Sweet & Maxwell. pp. 619–623. ISBN 978-0-421-31150-3.
- Davies, S. (1949) Journal of the Society of Public Teachers of Law (new series) 425
