= Appellate court =

Court of law that is empowered to hear an appeal

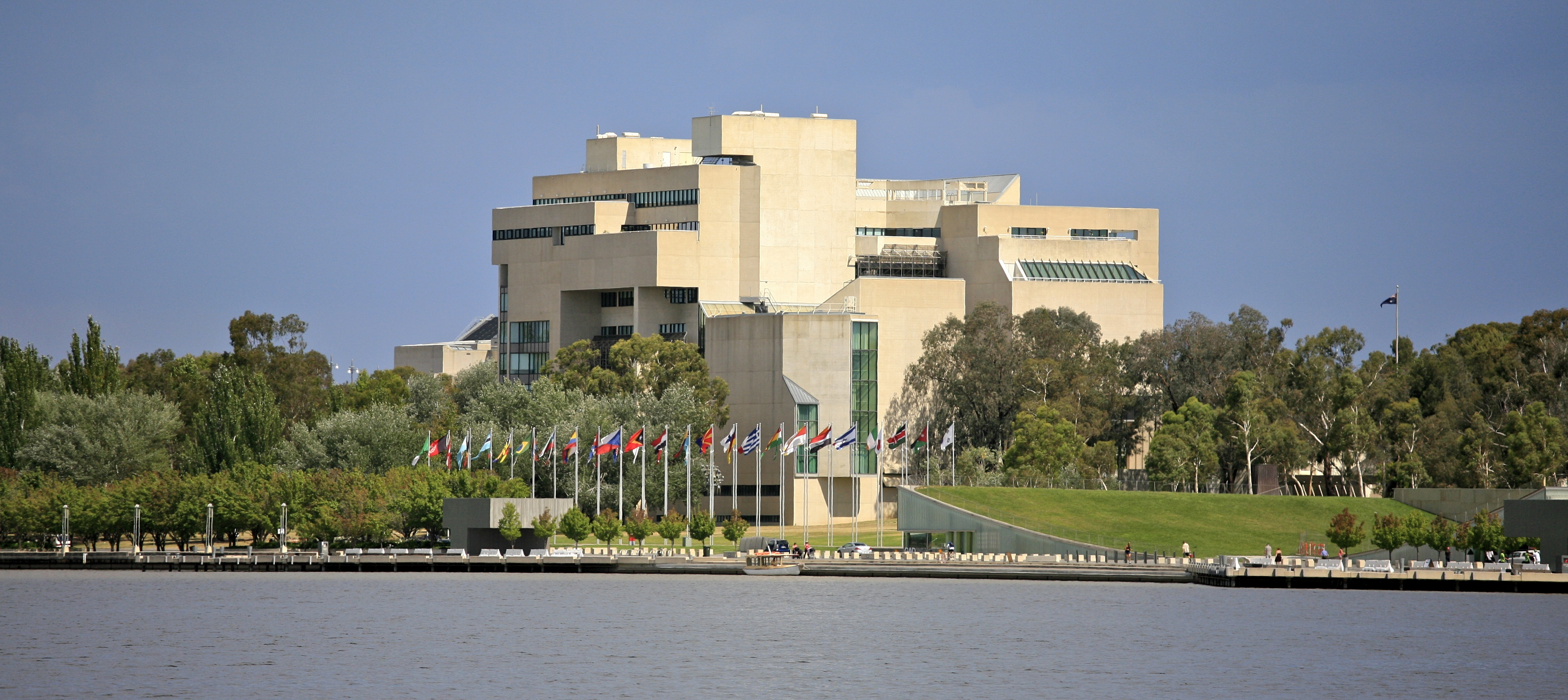
The High Court of Australia, the highest appellate court in Australia

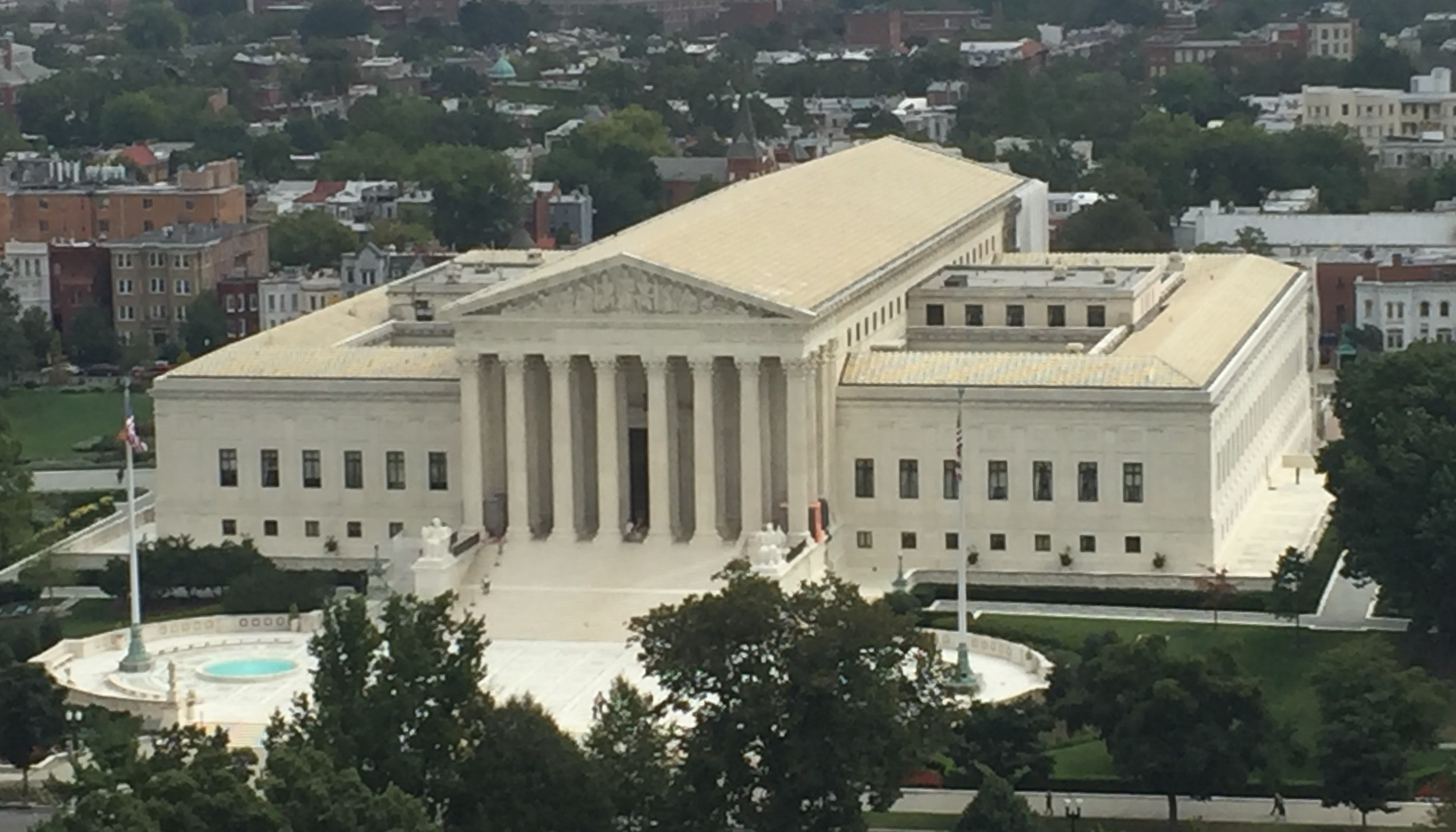
The Supreme Court of the United States, the highest court in the United States

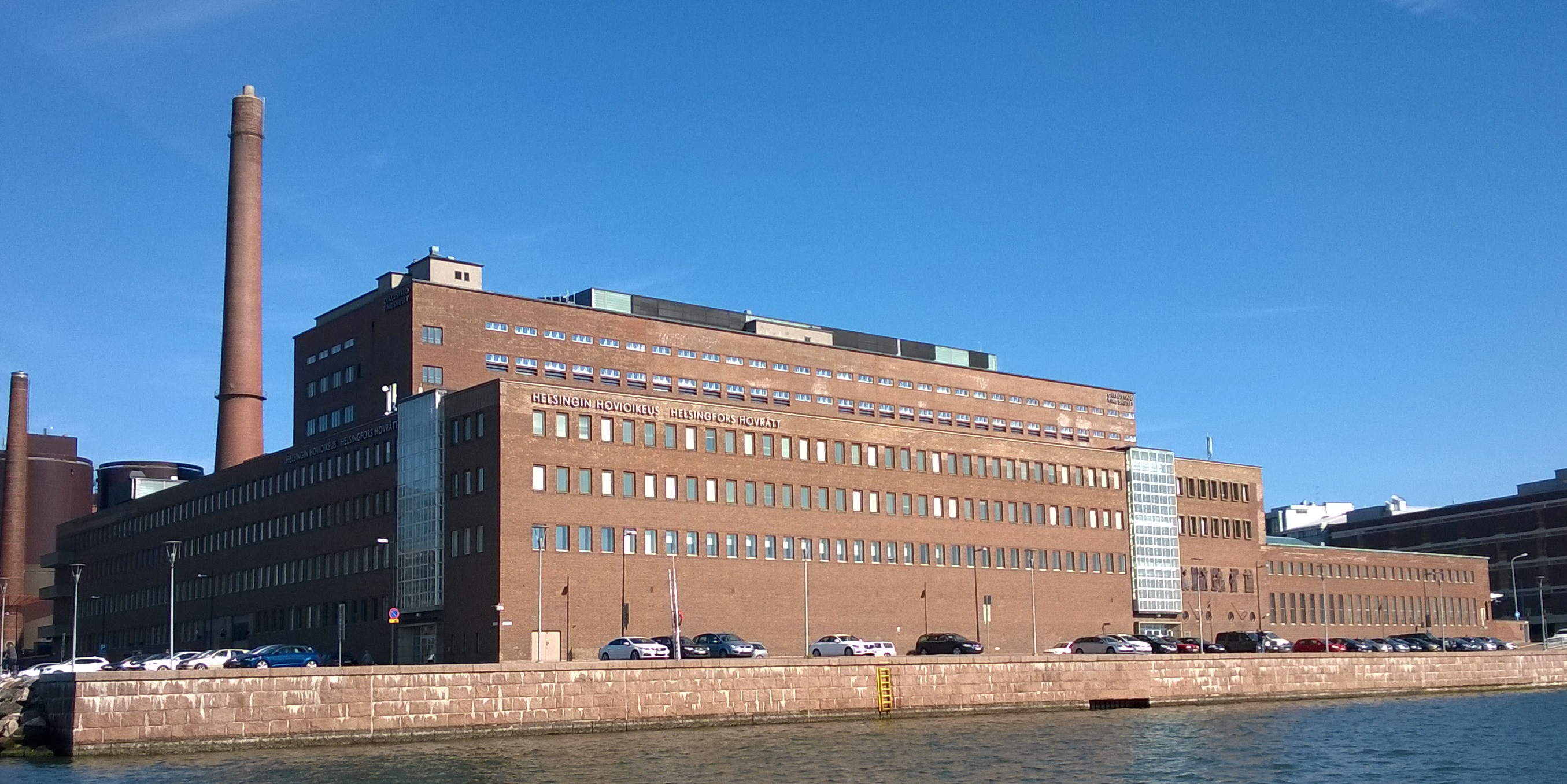
The Helsinki Court of Appeal (Helsingin hovioikeus), an intermediate appellate court in Finland

An appellate court, commonly called a court of appeal(s), appeal court, court of second instance or second instance court, is any court of law that is empowered to hear a case upon appeal from a trial court or other lower tribunal. An appellate court other than a supreme court is sometimes referred to as an intermediate appellate court.

In much of the world, court systems are divided into at least three levels: the trial court, which initially hears cases and considers factual evidence and testimony relevant to the case; at least one intermediate appellate court; and a supreme court (or court of last resort) which primarily reviews the decisions of the intermediate courts, often on a discretionary basis. A particular court system's supreme court is its highest appellate court. Appellate courts nationwide can operate under varying rules.

Under its standard of review, an appellate court determines the extent of the deference it will give to the lower court's decision, based on whether the appeal is one of fact or of law. In certain civil law jurisdictions, especially those following the French legal system, a first-level appellate court has the power to second-guess the trial court's finding of facts and retry the facts of the case at that level under the principle of double degré de juridiction.

In common law jurisdictions, an appellate court reviewing an issue of fact ordinarily gives deference to the trial court's findings. It is the duty of trial judges or juries to view the evidence firsthand, observe witness testimony, and resolve disputes over what facts are supported by the evidence by making findings of fact. When reviewing lower decisions on an issue of fact, courts of appeal generally look for "clear error". Transposed into civil law terminology, a second-instance proceeding in a common law court is "not a retrial of the parties' dispute but a trial of the first-instance trial"; the appellate court attempts to verify whether the trial was conducted according to correct legal principles and without procedural irregularity, not whether the judgment in the first instance was the right outcome.

An appellate court reviews issues of law de novo (that is, without deference to the lower court's interpretation) and may reverse or modify the lower court's decision if the appellate court believes the lower court misapplied the facts or the law. The application of the law to the facts (once the facts are established by factfinding in the first instance as explained above) is itself also an issue of law. If the appellate court finds a reversible error on an issue of law, it will reverse and remand with directions. If not promptly reversed by a higher court, the appellate court's ruling on that issue of law becomes final as to the parties and becomes part of the law of the case. In contrast, if the appellate court finds a reversible error on an issue of fact, it cannot immediately retry and decide the issue itself in the first instance, based on the evidence already in the record. It can only reverse and remand with instructions to the trial court for a new trial or new findings on that issue. However, such further factfinding proceedings may then be subject to further appeals as to whether they themselves were also procedurally proper and conducted in accordance with the appellate court's directions.

An appellate court may also review the lower judge's discretionary decisions, such as whether the judge properly granted a new trial or disallowed evidence. The lower court's decision is allowed to stand unless it is an "abuse of discretion". This standard tends to be even more deferential than the "clear error" standard.

Before hearing any case, the court must have jurisdiction to consider the appeal. The authority of appellate courts to review the decisions of lower courts varies widely from one jurisdiction to another. In some areas, the appellate court has limited powers of review. Generally, an appellate court's judgment provides the final directive of the appeals court as to the matter appealed, setting out with specificity the court's determination that the action appealed from should be affirmed, reversed, remanded or modified. Depending on the type of case and the decision below, appellate review primarily consists of either an entirely new hearing (a non trial de novo), a hearing where the appellate court gives deference to the factual findings of the lower court, or a hearing to review particular legal rulings made by the lower court (an appeal on the record).

== Bifurcation of civil and criminal appeals ==
While many appellate courts have jurisdiction over all cases decided by lower courts, some systems have appellate courts divided by the type of jurisdiction they exercise. Some jurisdictions have specialized appellate courts, such as the Texas Court of Criminal Appeals, which only hears appeals raised in criminal cases, and the U.S. Court of Appeals for the Federal Circuit, which has general jurisdiction but derives most of its caseload from patent cases, on one hand, and appeals from the Court of Federal Claims on the other. In the United States, Alabama, Tennessee, and Oklahoma also have separate courts of criminal appeals. Texas and Oklahoma have the final determination of criminal cases vested in their respective courts of criminal appeals, while Alabama and Tennessee allow decisions of its court of criminal appeals to be finally appealed to the state supreme court.

=== Courts of criminal appeals ===
Civilian

- Australian states and territories
  - New South Wales Court of Criminal Appeal
  - Northern Territory Court of Criminal Appeal
  - South Australia Court of Criminal Appeal
  - Tasmanian Court of Criminal Appeal
- Court of Criminal Appeal (Ireland), abolished 2014
- Malta Court of Criminal Appeal
- Countries of the United Kingdom
  - Court of Criminal Appeal (England and Wales), abolished 1966
  - Court of Criminal Appeal (Northern Ireland), abolished 1978
  - Court of Criminal Appeal (Scotland)
- U.S. states:
  - Alabama Court of Criminal Appeals
  - Oklahoma Court of Criminal Appeals
  - Tennessee Court of Criminal Appeals
  - Texas Court of Criminal Appeals

Military

- United States Army Court of Criminal Appeals
- Navy-Marine Corps Court of Criminal Appeals (United States)
- Coast Guard Court of Criminal Appeals (United States)
- Air Force Court of Criminal Appeals (United States)

=== Courts of civil appeals ===
- Alabama Court of Civil Appeals
- Oklahoma Court of Civil Appeals

== Appellate courts by country ==
=== Australia ===
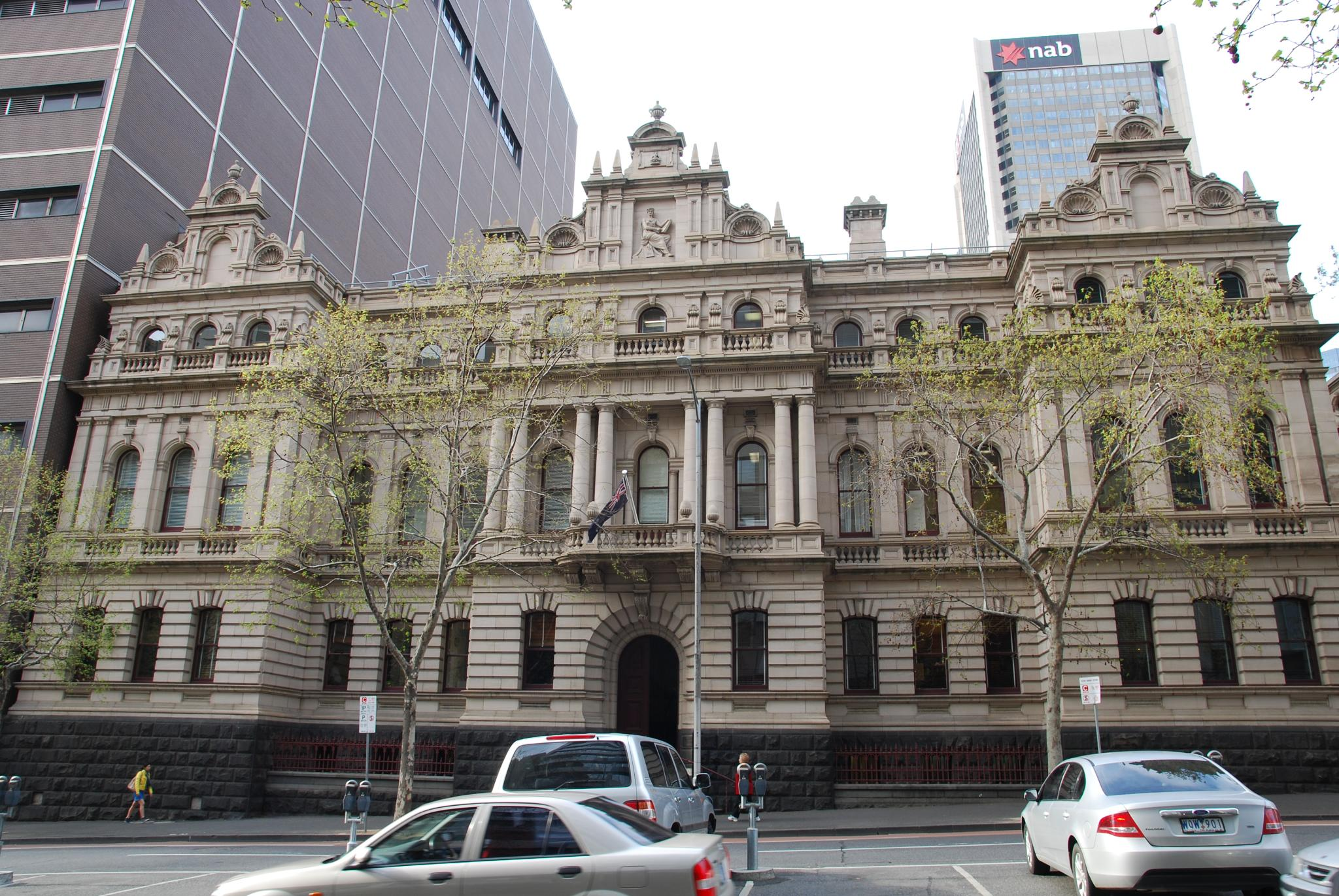
The Victorian Court of Appeal

The High Court has appellate jurisdiction over all other courts. Leave must be granted by the court, before the appeal matter is heard. The High Court is paramount to all federal courts. Further, it has a constitutionally entrenched general power of appeal from the Supreme Courts of the States and Territories. Appeals to the High Court are by special leave only, which is generally only granted in cases of public importance, matters involving the interpretation of the Commonwealth Constitution, or where the law has been inconsistently applied across the States and Territories. Therefore, in the vast majority of cases, the appellate divisions of the Supreme Courts of each State and Territory and the Federal Court are the final courts of appeal.

=== England and Wales ===
The court has two divisions, Criminal and Civil, led by the Lady Chief Justice and the Master of the Rolls respectively. Criminal appeals, from the Crown Court, are heard in the Criminal Division, and civil appeals, from the County Court, High Court of Justice, and Family Court, are heard in the Civil Division. Permission to appeal is normally required from either the lower court or the Court of Appeal itself. Its decisions are binding on all courts, apart from the Supreme Court of the United Kingdom, to which with permission a further appeal may lie.

=== New Zealand ===
The Court of Appeal of New Zealand, located in Wellington, is New Zealand's principal intermediate appellate court. In practice, most appeals are resolved at this intermediate appellate level, rather than in the Supreme Court.

=== Philippines ===
The Court of Appeals of the Philippines is the principal intermediate appellate court of that country. The Court of Appeals is primarily found in Manila, with three divisions each in Cebu City and Cagayan de Oro. Other appellate courts include the Sandiganbayan for cases involving graft and corruption, and the Court of Tax Appeals for cases involving tax. Appeals from all three appellate courts are to the Supreme Court.

=== Scotland ===
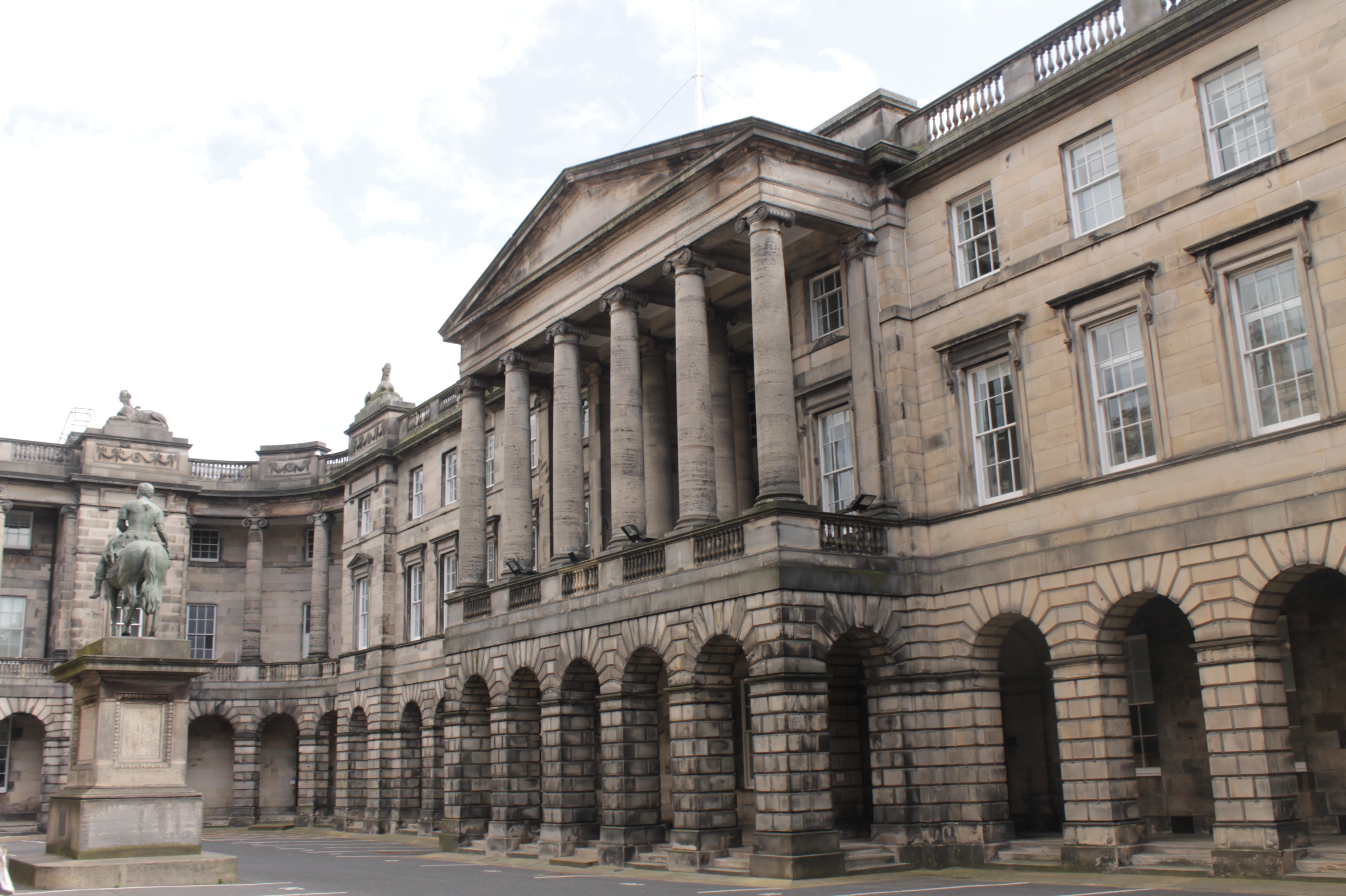
Parliament House, Edinburgh, home to the Supreme Courts of Scotland since 1707

The Court of Session is the highest national court in Scotland in relation to civil cases. Early judges of the court recorded their decisions and codified the law at a time early in the development of Scots law, leading to the development and distinct character of Scots law. In modern times, the court has ruled on issues of public importance and proceedings of its Inner House have been streamed and recorded since 2023. The court now hears cases from any part of Scotland on any issue, other than criminal cases, which belong to its sister court, the High Court of Justiciary. The Court of Session is the Royal Court of Scotland, hearing civil cases in the name of the Monarch. Judges are termed Lords of Council and Session and appointed simultaneously to the College of Justice and the High Court of Justiciary. Their number is fixed by statute, currently to 37, although a number of temporary judges assist the court with its workload. The court is led by the Lord President of the Court of Session who also heads the Scottish judiciary.

The High Court of Justiciary is the supreme criminal court in Scotland. The High Court is both a trial court and a court of appeal. As a trial court, the High Court sits on circuit at Parliament House or in the adjacent former Sheriff Court building in the Old Town in Edinburgh, or in dedicated buildings in Glasgow and Aberdeen. The High Court sometimes sits in various smaller towns in Scotland, where it uses the local sheriff court building. As an appeal court, the High Court sits only in Edinburgh. The High Court will hear appeals from the sheriff courts of Scotland where the trial was under solemn proceedings; the High Court will also hear referrals on points of law from the Sheriff Appeal Court, and from summary proceedings in the sheriff courts and justice of the peace courts. Cases can be remitted to the High Court by the sheriff courts after conviction for sentencing, where a sheriff believes that their sentencing powers are inadequate. The High Court can impose a life sentence but the sheriff has a limit of five years sentencing; both can issue an unlimited fine.

=== Sri Lanka ===
The Court of Appeal of Sri Lanka, located in Colombo, is the second senior court in the Sri Lankan legal system.

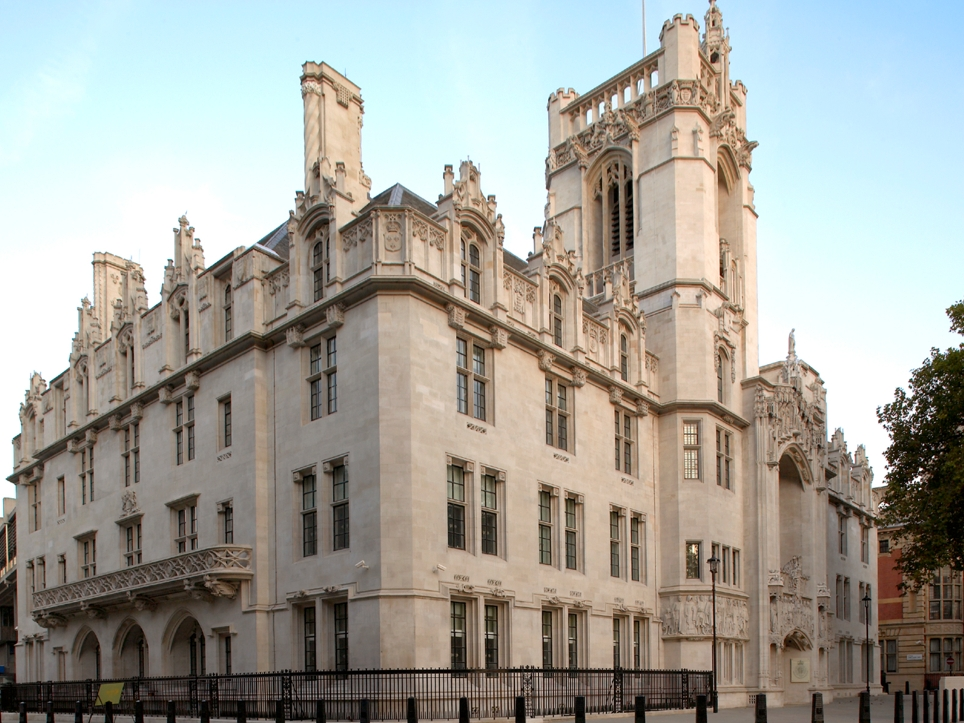
The Middlesex Guildhall, in Westminster, which houses the Supreme Court of the United Kingdom

=== United States ===
In the United States, both state and federal appellate courts are usually restricted to examining whether the lower court made the correct legal determinations, rather than hearing direct evidence and determining what the facts of the case were. Furthermore, U.S. appellate courts are usually restricted to hearing appeals based on matters that were originally brought up before the trial court. Hence, such an appellate court will not consider an appellant's argument if it is based on a theory that is raised for the first time in the appeal.

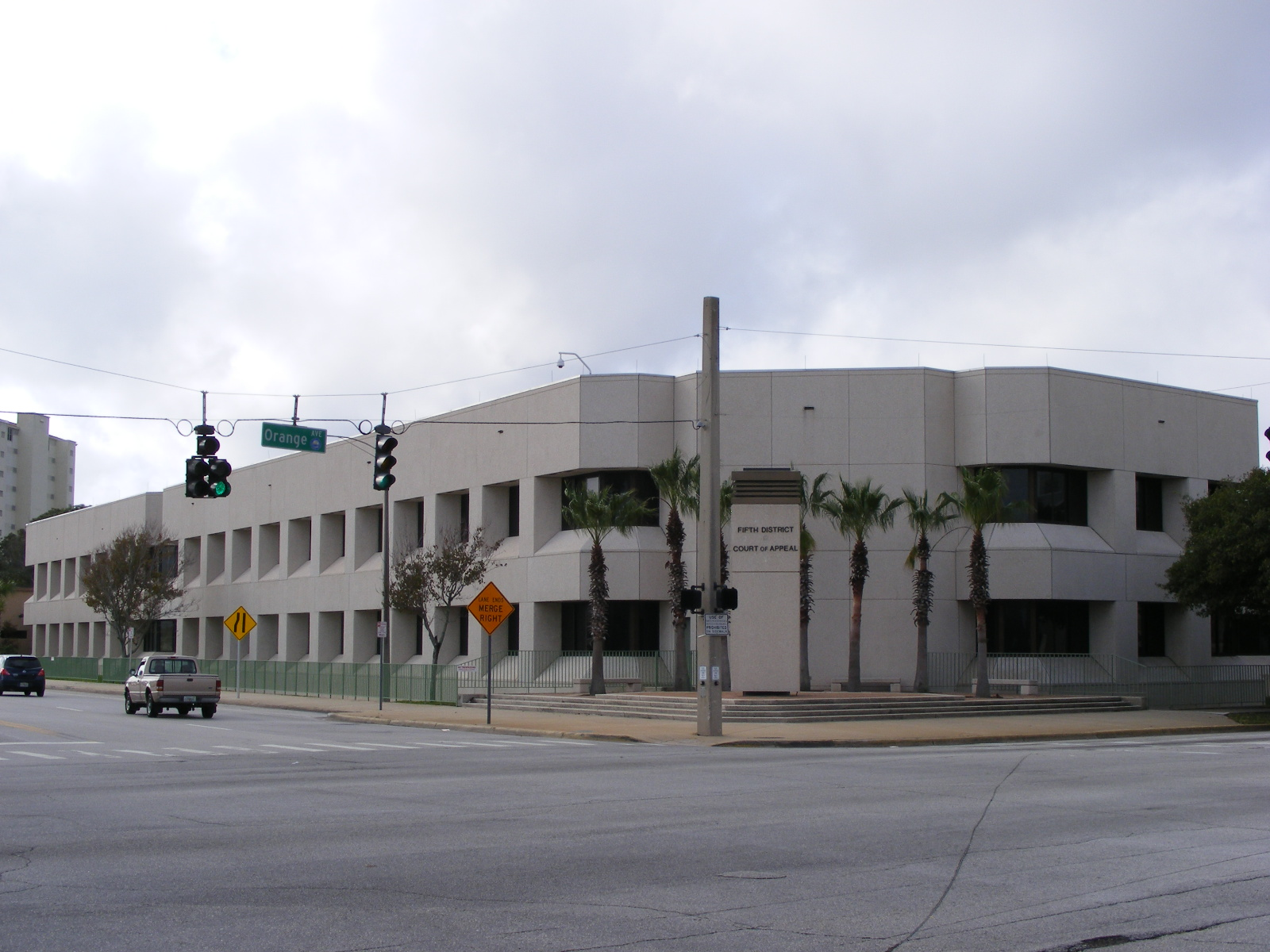
The Fifth District Court of Appeal for Florida, an intermediate appellate court for the Florida judicial system

In most U.S. states, and in U.S. federal courts, parties before the court are allowed one appeal as of right. This means that a party who is unsatisfied with the outcome of a trial may bring an appeal to contest that outcome. However, appeals may be costly, and the appellate court must find an error on the part of the court below that justifies upsetting the verdict. Therefore, only a small proportion of trial court decisions result in appeals. Some courts, particularly supreme courts, have the power of discretionary review, meaning that they can decide whether they will hear an appeal brought in a particular case.

==== Nomenclature ====
Many U.S. jurisdictions title their appellate court a court of appeal or court of appeals. Both terms are used in the United States; the plural form is more common in American English, while British English uses only the singular form.

Historically, certain jurisdictions have titled their appellate court a court of errors (or court of errors and appeals), on the premise that it was intended to correct errors made by lower courts. Examples of such courts include the New Jersey Court of Errors and Appeals (which existed from 1844 to 1947), the Connecticut Supreme Court of Errors (which has been renamed the Connecticut Supreme Court), the Kentucky Court of Errors (renamed the Kentucky Supreme Court), and the Mississippi High Court of Errors and Appeals (since renamed the Supreme Court of Mississippi). In some jurisdictions, a court able to hear appeals is known as an appellate division.

The phrase "court of appeals" most often refers to intermediate appellate courts. However, the New York Court of Appeals is the highest appellate court in New York. The New York Supreme Court is a trial court of general jurisdiction. The Supreme Court of Maryland was known as the Court of Appeals, and the Appellate Court of Maryland was known as the Court of Special Appeals, until a 2022 constitutional amendment changed their names. Depending on the system, certain courts may serve as both trial courts and appellate courts, hearing appeals of decisions made by courts with more limited jurisdiction.

== See also ==
- Court of Criminal Appeal (disambiguation)
- Court of Appeal (Hong Kong)
- High Court (Hong Kong)
- Court of Appeal (England and Wales)
- Court of cassation
