= Court of Criminal Appeal (Northern Ireland) =

The Court of Criminal Appeal of Northern Ireland was established on the model of the English Court by the Criminal Appeal (Northern Ireland) Act 1930. It was replaced by a general Court of Appeal by section 34 of the Judicature (Northern Ireland) Act 1978.
