= Rape in Sweden =

Sexual violence in Sweden

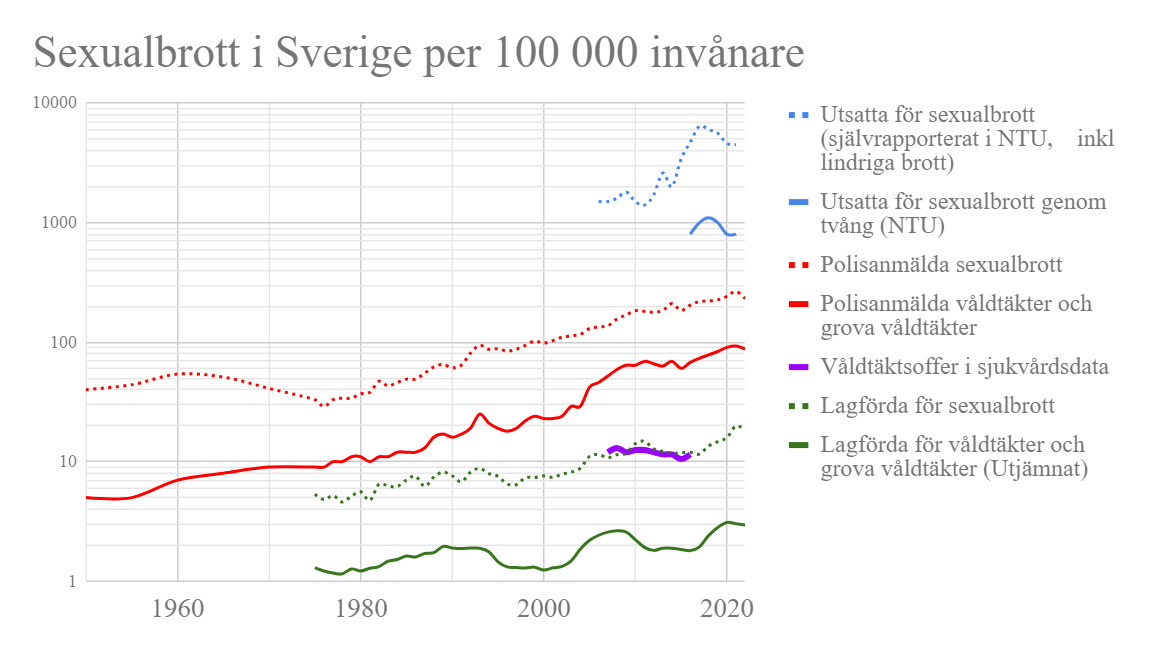
Number of sexual crimes in Sweden per 100 000 inhabitants over time

Rape in Sweden has a legal definition described in Chapter 6 in the Swedish Penal Code. Historically, rape has been defined as forced sexual intercourse initiated against a woman or man by one or several people, without consent. In recent years, several revisions to the definition of rape have been made to the law of Sweden, to include not only intercourse but also comparable sexual acts against someone incapable of giving consent, due to being in a vulnerable situation, such as a state of fear or unconsciousness.

In 2017, there were 4,895 reported rape cases and 190 convictions. In 2018, Sweden passed a new law that criminalizes sex without consent as rape, even when there are no threats, coercion, or violence involved. Sweden no longer requires prosecutors to prove the use or threat of violence or coercion. This led to a rise in convictions of 75% to 333.

== Legislation ==
The first statutory law against rape in Sweden dates back to the 13th century. It was considered a serious crime, punishable by death until 1779. The current Swedish Penal Code was adopted in 1962 and enacted on 1 January 1965. A long-standing tradition of gender equality in policy and legislation, as well as an established feminist movement, have led to several legislative changes and amendments, greatly expanding the definition of rape. For example, in 1965 Sweden was one of the first countries in the world to criminalise marital rape. Homosexual acts and gender neutrality were first introduced in 1984, and sex with someone by improperly exploiting them while they are unconscious (e.g. due to intoxication or sleep) was included in the definition of rape in 2005. In 2018, the legislation regarding sexual crimes was changed in a major way where the focus was no longer on the use of threats or force, but rather on the consent of the parties involved.

This excerpt is an unofficial translation, from the Swedish Government's website:

A person who performs vaginal, anal or oral intercourse, or some other sexual act that in view of the seriousness of the violation is comparable to sexual intercourse, with a person who is not participating voluntarily is guilty of rape and is sentenced to imprisonment for at least three and at most six years.

The same applies to a person who induces another person who is not participating voluntarily to undertake or submit to such an act. When assessing whether participation is voluntary or not, particular consideration is given to whether voluntariness was expressed by word or deed or in some other way. A person can never be considered to be participating voluntarily if:

1. their participation is a result of assault, other violence or a threat of a criminal act, a threat to bring a prosecution against or report another person for an offence, or a threat to give detrimental information about another person;

2. the perpetrator improperly exploits the fact that the person is in a particularly vulnerable situation due to unconsciousness, sleep, grave fear, the influence of alcohol or drugs, illness, bodily injury, mental disturbance or otherwise in view of the circumstances; or

3. the perpetrator induces the person to participate by seriously abusing the person’s position of dependence on the perpetrator.

In Sweden, case law also plays an important role in setting precedent on the application of the legislation. For example, a 2008 ruling by the Supreme Court decided that digital penetration of the vagina, on a woman who is intoxicated or sleeping, shall be regarded as a sexual act comparable to sexual intercourse, and is therefore an act of rape.

== Swedish rape statistics ==
Ever since the collation of crime statistics was initiated by the Council of Europe, Sweden has had the highest number of registered rape offences in Europe by a considerable extent. In 1996, Sweden registered almost three times the average number of rape offences registered in 35 European countries. However, this does not necessarily mean rape is three times as likely to occur as in the rest of Europe, since cross-national comparisons of crime levels based on official crime statistics are problematic, due to a number of factors described below.

There are three types of factors that determine the outcome of crime statistics: statistical factors, legal factors, and substantive factors. According to a study in the year 2000 by Hanns von Hofer, Professor of Criminology at Stockholm University, the combined effect of these "make it safe to contend that the Swedish rape statistics constitute an 'over-reporting' relative to the European average".

In 2014, there were 6,697 rapes reported to the Swedish police, or 69 cases per 100,000 population, according to the Swedish National Council for Crime Prevention (BRÅ), which is an 11% increase from the previous year. In 2015, the number of reported rapes declined 12%, to 5918. On the other hand, Swedish Crime Survey in 2015 showed that 1.7% of the total population, or 129,000 people between 16 and 79 years old have been exposed to some extension of sexual offenses (including rape) previously in their lives, increased from 1% in 2014. In 2016, the number of reported rapes increased again to 6,715. The number of rapes reported to the authorities in Sweden significantly increased by 10% in 2017, according to latest preliminary figures from the Swedish National Council for Crime Prevention. The number of reported rape cases was 73 per 100,000 citizens in 2017, up 24% in the past decade. In 2018, official numbers showed that the incidence of sexual offences was on the rise; the Swedish Government declared that young women are facing the greatest risks and that most of the cases go unreported.

=== Statistical factors ===
Unlike the majority of countries in Europe, crime data in Sweden are collected when the offence in question is first reported, at which point the classification may be unclear. In Sweden, once an act has been registered as rape, it retains this classification in the published crime statistics, even if later investigations indicate that no crime can be proven or if the offence must be given an alternative judicial classification.

Sweden also applies a system of expansive offence counts. Other countries may employ more restrictive methods of counting. The Swedish police registers one offence for each person raped, and if one and the same person has been raped on a number of occasions, one offence is counted for each occasion that can be specified. For example, if a woman says she has been raped by her husband every day during a month, the Swedish police may record more than 30 cases of rape. In many other countries only a single offence would be counted in such a situation.

In Sweden, crime statistics refer to the year when the offence was reported; the actual offence may have been committed long before. Swedish rape statistics can thus contain significant time-lag, which makes interpretations of annual changes difficult.

=== Legal factors ===
The way the crime itself is defined and various related aspects of the judicial process affect the registration of offences in the official statistics. The concept of rape can be defined narrowly or in a more expansive manner. In Sweden, the definition of rape has been successively widened over the years, leading to an ever-larger number of sexual assaults being classified as rape. For example, in 1992 a legislative change came into force which shifted the dividing line between sexual assault and rape. This legislative change resulted in about a 25% increase in the level of registered rape offences.

Changes in the legal process has also affected the number of reports. Until 1984, rape was only prosecuted in cases where the victim was prepared to press charges, with an additional restriction of a six months time limit. This resulted in numerous cases of rape and sexual assault going unreported.

The Swedish prosecution system is governed by the principle of legality and the "equality principle", which means that as a rule, the police and the prosecution service are required to register and prosecute all offences of which they become aware. This can be assumed to lead to a more frequent registration of offences than in systems with the inverse "expediency principle", where the classification of offences is negotiable on the basis of plea bargaining, and the prosecutor has the right not to prosecute, even when a prosecution would be technically possible. English speaking common law countries operate an adversarial system.

=== Substantive factors ===
Willingness to report crime also affects the statistics. In countries where rape remains associated with a strong taboo and a high level of shame, the propensity to report such offences probably tends to be lower than in countries characterized by a higher level of sexual equality. A police force and judicial system enjoining a high level of confidence and a good reputation with the public will produce a higher propensity to report crime than a police force which is discredited, inspires fear or distrust.

The findings of the 2000 International Crime Victims Survey (ICVS) indicate that the respondents' satisfaction with the police is above average in Sweden, with almost no experience of corruption. Sweden has also been ranked number one in sexual equality.

=== Birthplace of perpetrators ===
2013–2018 birthplace of rapists convicted in Sweden. Total 843.

In 1994, of the 314 men arrested for rape, 79% were born in Europe, 21% were born outside of Europe; 50% were foreigners.

In 2018, Swedish Television investigative journalism show Uppdrag Granskning analysed the total of 843 district court cases from the five preceding years and found that 58% of all convicted of rape and attempted rape had a foreign background. 40% were immigrants born in the Middle East and Africa, with young men from Afghanistan numbering 45 standing out as being the next most common country of birth after Sweden. When only analysing rape assault (Swedish: överfallsvåldtäkt) cases, that is cases where perpetrator and victim were not previously acquainted, 97 out of 129 (75%) were born outside Europe, with 40 percent of these having been in Sweden for a year or less. The Mission Investigation programme, broadcast by SVT, said that the total number of offenders over five years was 843. Of those, 197 were from the Middle East and North Africa, with 45 coming from Afghanistan, and 134 from Southern Africa. "We are very clear in the programme that it is a small percentage of the people coming from abroad who are convicted of rape," chief editor Ulf Johansson told the BBC News. Former policeman Mustafa Panshiri, who was born in Afghanistan, said that Afghan immigrants bring with them attitudes towards women and sexuality which collide with Swedish values concerning equality. Swedish Television's investigating journalists found that in cases where the victims didn't know the attackers, the proportion of foreign-born sex offenders was more than 80%.

In 2021, a study found that of 3039 offenders aged 15–60 convicted of raping over 18 years of age in the 2000–2015 period, 59.2% had an immigrant background of which 47.7% with immigrant background were born outside Sweden.

== International comparison ==
Widely differing legal systems, offence definitions, terminological variations, recording practices and statistical conventions makes any cross-national comparison on rape statistics difficult. Large-scale victimisation surveys have been presented as a more reliable indicator.

=== UNODC report ===
A frequently cited source when comparing Swedish rape statistics internationally is the regularly published report by the United Nations Office on Drugs and Crime (UNODC). In 2012, according to the report by UNODC, Sweden was quoted as having 66.5 cases of reported rapes per 100,000 population, based on official statistics by Brå. This is the highest number of reported rape of any nation in the report. The high number of reported rapes in Sweden can partly be explained by the comparatively broad definition of rape, the method of which the Swedish police record rapes, a high confidence in the criminal justice system, and an effort by the Government of Sweden to decrease the number of unreported rapes.^{[note 1]}

==== Unreliable data for cross-national comparison ====
The UNODC itself discourages any cross-national comparisons based on their reports, because of the differences that exist between legal definitions, methods of offense counting and crime reporting. In 2013, of the 129 countries listed in the UNODC report, a total of 67 countries had no reported data on rape. Some majority-Muslim countries missing data—for example Egypt—classifies rape as assault. A crime survey funded by the UN and published in The Lancet Global Health concluded that almost a quarter of all men admit to rape in parts of Asia. Some of the countries with the highest percentage of men admitting rape in that study, China and Bangladesh for instance, are also not listed or have relatively low numbers of reported rape in the UNODC report.

8 out of 10 of the countries with the highest number of reported rape in the 2011 UNODC report were members of OECD, an organization of high-income economies with a very high Human Development Index. 6 out of 10 countries with the highest number of reported rapes were also in the top of the Global Gender Gap Index rankings.

== Victim surveys ==
In Sweden there is a comparatively broad definition of what constitutes rape. This means that more sexual crimes are registered as rape than in most other countries. For this reason, criminologists tend to recommend crime comparisons between countries based on large surveys of the general public, so-called victim surveys.

=== The Swedish Crime Survey ===
Percentage stating they were victims of sexual crime 2006–2017

The Swedish Crime Survey (SCS) is a recurrent survey by Brå of the attitudes and experiences of the general population regarding victimization, fear of crime and public confidence in the justice system, with an annual sample size of around 15,000 respondents.

In its 2018 report, Nationella trygghetsundersökningen 2018 (tr: "national survey of safety 2018") the Swedish National Council for Crime Prevention stated that there had been an increase in the self-reported number of victims of sexual crime among from 4.7% in 2016 to 6.4% in 2017. In the five preceding years there were escalating levels compared to the 2005–2012 period where the level was relatively stable. The increase in self-reported victimisation was greater among women than among men. While the number of male victims remained largely constant over the timespan (see graph). The questionnaire polls for incidents which would equate to attempted sexual assault or rape according to Swedish law.

== Conviction rate ==
In 2009, Amnesty International published a report on rape in the Nordic countries, criticizing the low conviction rates in Sweden, citing previously published estimates from Brå of around 30,000 incidents of rape, with less than 13 percent of the 3,535 rape crimes reported resulting in a decision to start legal proceedings and 216 persons convicted in 2007, with Amnesty using the word "impunity" to describe the situation.

According to a London Metropolitan University study in 2009, funded by the European Commission Daphne Programme—primarily focused on attrition, the process by which rape cases fail to proceed through the justice system—Sweden had the highest number of reported rapes in Europe (almost twice that of England and Wales, based on 2002-2007 UNODC figures), that may or may not be attributed to the fact that in 2005 there has been reform in the sex crime legislation. That change in the legislation applies for rapes reported in 2006 and 2007 but it doesn't apply for the previous rapes reported in 2002, 2003, 2004 and 2005 before the change and when the reported rapes in Sweden were still the highest in Europe. The reform made the legal definition of rape one of the widest legal definitions in the world, but not the lowest conviction rate. Insufficient evidence was the most frequent reason why cases were discontinued before court (53%).

The authors of the study questioned the accuracy of the data provided by the countries reporting low instances of rape. They also noted that a widening of the definition of rape in law; procedural rules which require police to record all reports, a confidence in the criminal justice system and a greater willingness among Swedish women to report rape in relationships could account for the relative high number of reported rapes in Sweden.

The low conviction rate could be explained by the reduced legal distinction between rape and permitted intercourse, leading to greater challenges for the prosecution to prove its case, according to Petter Asp, Professor of Criminal Law at Stockholm University.

The number of convictions remained relatively unchanged from 2005 to 2014, with approximately 190 convictions on average each year. The total number of convictions for rape and aggravated rape in Sweden 2015 was 176. The total number of convictions for sexual offences, which includes rape but also other crimes such as buying sexual services, was 1160.

== Gang rape ==
In 2013, Forskning & Framsteg, a Swedish popular science magazine, published an article reporting that "The evidence suggests that gang rapes in Sweden is increasing—despite the decline in violent crime in general." FoF went on to report that, "The increase, which primarily occurred in the 2000s, may have to do with "rape with multiple perpetrators" from 2004, classified as "serious crime", which means that more obscure cases fall into this category." FoF further reports that "National Council's investigator, Klara Hradilova-Selin, said that "developments could at least partly be interpreted in terms of an actual increase." Although there are a number of other important reasons why we are seeing more reports, such as, Klara Hradilova-Selin goes on to say, "more woman dare to go the police" and an "increased alcohol consumption". Finally FoF goes on to report that in the 1990s "In the gang rape of three or more perpetrators 39 percent are foreign born." The statistics for gang rapes were not investigated by Swedish authorities after 2006.

In March 2018, newspaper Expressen investigated gang rape court cases from the two preceding years and found that there were 43 men having been convicted. Their average age was 21 and 13 were under the age of 18 when the crime was committed. Of the convicted, 40 out of the 43 were either immigrants (born abroad) or born in Sweden to immigrant parents. Another investigation by newspaper Aftonbladet found that of 112 men and boys convicted for gang rape since July 2012, 82 were born outside Europe. The median age of the victims was 15, while 7 out of 10 perpetrators were between 15 and 20.

== Unreported cases ==
According to Brå in 2013, it is likely that as many as 80 percent of all rapes are not reported, which was supported in a 2014 study of the extent of violence against women, funded by the Government of Sweden and the Crime Victim Compensation and Support Authority. This can be compared to a 2007 British Government report, estimating that between 75 and 95 percent of rapes are not reported in the United Kingdom.

== See also ==
- We Are Sthlm sexual assaults
- Crime in Sweden
- Under-reporting
- Assange v Swedish Prosecution Authority
- Rape statistics
- National Centre for Knowledge on Men's Violence against Women
- Victim blaming

== Notes ==
1.^{1} ^{2} See National Centre for Knowledge on Men's Violence against Women
