= FOF =

FOF may refer to:

- Fact or Faked: Paranormal Files, an American television series
- Fear of falling
- Fight or Flight (disambiguation)
- Finding of fact
- Finnish Orienteering Federation
- Flow of funds
- Focus on the Family
- Forum of Firms, an accountancy trade organization
- Forskning och Framsteg, a Swedish popular science magazine
- Fred. Olsen Airtransport, a defunct Norwegian airline
- Frets on Fire, a video game
- Fund of funds
- Identification friend or foe
- FOF grade tea
- FOF, the SMILES notation for oxygen difluoride
