= Swedes in Japan =

在日スウェーデン人 (Japanese) Svenskar i Japan (Swedish)
- (Sweden) (Japan)

Total population
- 2,135 (in December, 2025)

Regions with significant populations
- Tokyo, Kyoto, Saitama, Sapporo

Languages
- Swedish

Religion
- Christianity, Shinto

Related ethnic groups
- Swedes

Swedes in Japan (在日スウェーデン人) (Swedish: Svenskar i Japan) consists of Swedish migrants to Japan, as well as their descendants. In December 2025, there were 2,135 Swedes living in Japan.

== History ==
Johan Olofsson Bergenstierna was the first Swede to visit Japan, arriving on the island of Dejima in 1647. He later became a marine leader in Sweden. Following the establishment of diplomatic relations between both countries in 1868, many Swedish explorers visited Japan. The first large arrivals of Swedes in Japan were in the 1960s when many Swedes arrived to study or live in Japan. Since then Swedes have been one of the significant European communities in Japan. In 2000, there were about 1,158 Swedes in Japan. With almost 2,135 Swedes in Japan as of 2025, it is the largest Scandinavian community in the country and the largest Swedish community in East Asia. Since Swedish culture gained popularity in Japan, especially pop culture, many Swedish events were held in Japan by the Swedish community. Japan has a Swedish protestant church and there have also been Swedish-Japanese marriages. Many Swedes are students and work as artists or in Swedish gastronomy.

In 1984, Sweden Hills was built in Hokkaido where it became a village with Swedish-style houses. It has a population of about 800 and hosts Swedish cultural events. It has also a Swedish cultural center.

== Notable people ==
- Janni Olsson
- Ingrid Fuzjko Hemming
- Åsa Ekström
- LiLiCo
- PewDiePie

== See also ==
- Japan–Sweden relations
- Swedish diaspora
- Immigration to Japan
