= Bullerby syndrome =

Cultural term referring to an idealization of Sweden

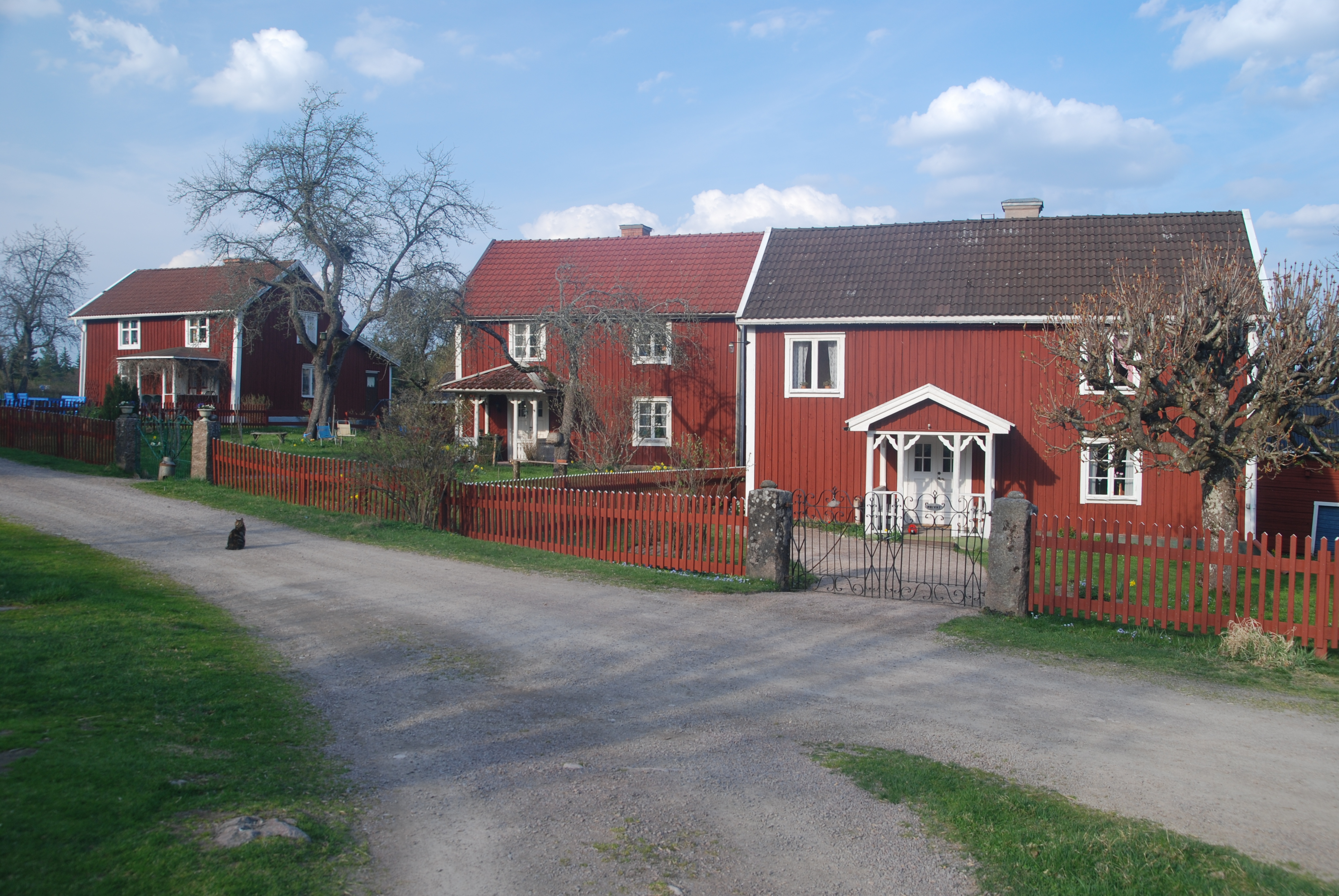
Houses in Sevedstorp, near Vimmerby, Kalmar County, Sweden, the model and film location for Bullerby.

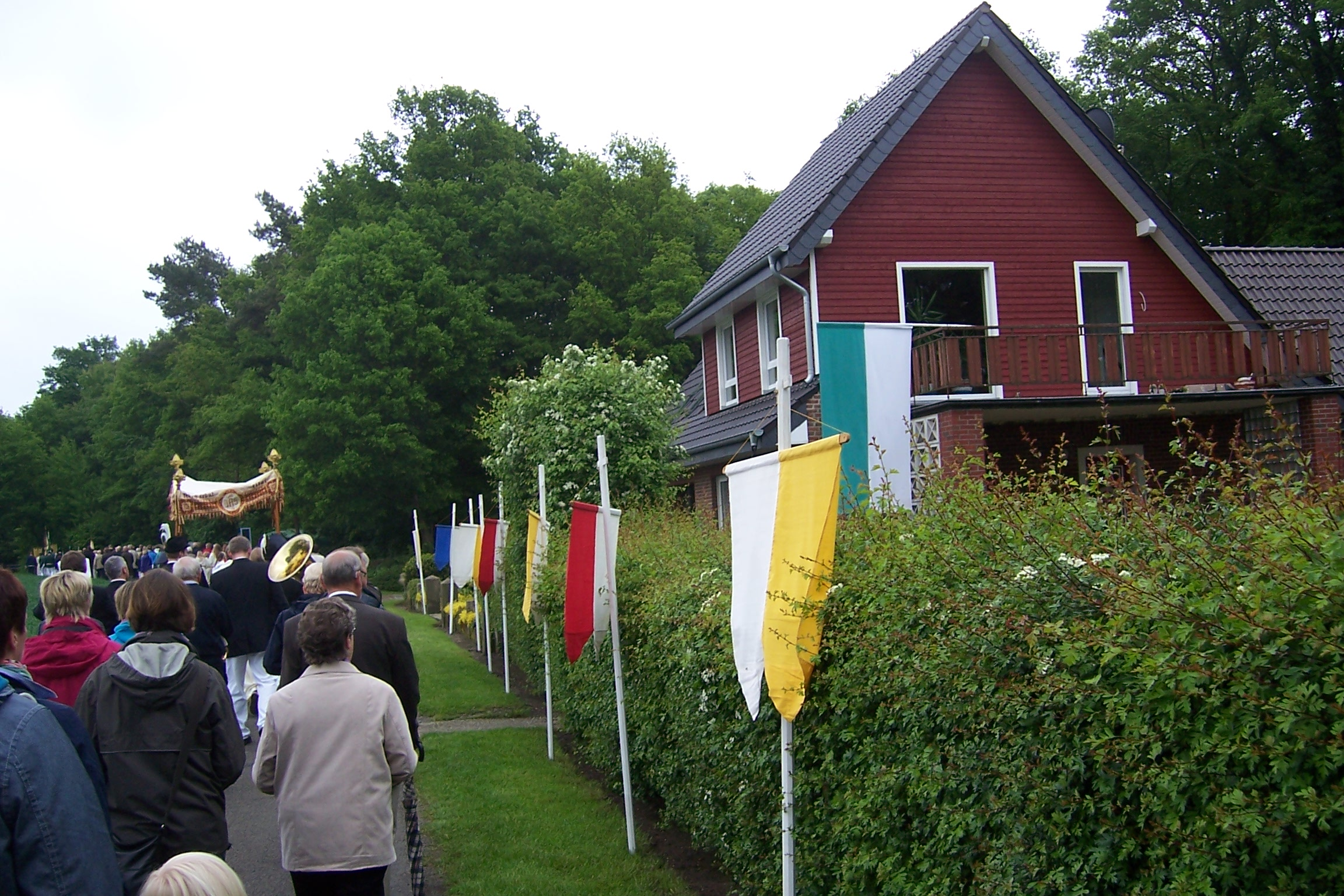
Falu red Schwedenhaus (Sweden House) in Welbergen, a district of Ochtrup, North Rhine-Westphalia, Germany.

Bullerby syndrome (German: Bullerbü-Syndrom) is a term referring to an idealization of Sweden, which may occur in German-speaking Europe. It consists of a stereotypical image of Sweden, usually with positive associations, including wooden houses, clear lakes, green forests, elk, blond hair, happy people, and midsummer sunshine. The term comes from Astrid Lindgren's The Six Bullerby Children books, set in rural Sweden.

Berthold Franke at the Goethe-Institut in Stockholm, Sweden, wrote articles about the phenomenon, published in Svenska Dagbladet in 2007. He stated that it was originally a view of Sweden, but now also the wish for a better Germany. According to him, Sweden symbolizes a healthy society and nature untouched by mankind.

In February 2008, the term was named "Word of the month" by the Swedish Language Council. In the wake of the popularity of Sweden and Astrid Lindgren's work, the Swedish branch of the Goethe-Institut organised the exhibition "Pippi on Tour in Germany" in 2008.

== See also ==
- Suecophile
- Sweden Hills
