= Sweden-bashing =

Criticism of Sweden and Swedish people

Sweden

Sweden-bashing refers to criticism of the Swedish government, the Swedish people, the Swedish language, or Sweden as a whole. The opposite of Sweden-bashing is Suecophilia.

== In academia ==
In proposing the use of the term "Sweden-bashing", historian Dr. Carl Marklund posited the phenomenon as follows:

The often cited exemplarity of Sweden among progressive countries worldwide—due to its Third World solidarity abroad as well as its social policies at home—also made it the subject of an admittedly marginal, but vocal genre of diagnosis and criticism, first from conservatives, later from liberals, that can be termed "Sweden-bashing." Key themes in this genre include allegedly totalitarian tendencies in the Swedish welfare state as well as a supposedly anti-Western bias in Swedish Cold War neutrality.

Sweden-bashing was used in the 1960s U.S. presidential election between Eisenhower and John F. Kennedy. In 1960 while addressing the Republican National Committee, President Eisenhower described Sweden as a cautionary tale about socialism and government intrusion into the affairs of individuals. He described Sweden as engaging in an "experiment of almost complete paternalism", and cited what he said were allegedly high rates of alcoholism, suicide, and divorce, as well as a "lack of ambition".

Although American criticisms of Swedish welfare policies were initially received with skepticism among Swedish conservatives, they gradually became accepted as part of a "shift to the right" in Sweden's self-image and perception abroad. He wrote that this "underscor[ed] how originally distant actors, marginal discourses and random events may be amplified through transnational circulation of ideas and images", and noted that some regarded the shift to the right as evidence of a counter-strategy by business interests to oppose the radical left of the 1970s, or as a "purposive elite strategy of political communication."

A renewal of negative American publicity about Sweden followed the Social Democrats' return to power in 1982, focusing on alleged problems of rising racism and xenophobia focused on immigrants. He also noted that Gösta Grassman, a foreign affairs press officer with the Swedish government, had referred to criticism of the Swedish welfare state as "the 1984 reports" due to the portrayal of Sweden as a totalitarian state by such critics. Grassman said that in this new strain of criticism, the previous portrayal of Sweden's welfare state as a ploy to mask what was allegedly a covert form of capitalism had evolved into a similar allegation that the welfare state masked what was allegedly a form of socialism. The point of the reference to Nineteen Eighty-four, the dystopian novel by George Orwell, according to Grassman, was "to shock by reimagining a democratic, egalitarian, and prosperous Western society as 'totalitarian.'"

Marklund wrote that in the tumult of debate, "it became increasingly difficult to distinguish the foreign reporting on Sweden and the Swedish debate on Sweden from the Swedish discussion of the image of Sweden abroad." While he acknowledged that the criticisms "can be viewed as examples of legitimate international journalism or political debate in Sweden itself", Marklund argued that they were often blown out of proportion in late 1983, both in foreign press coverage of Sweden and in the Swedish reception of that coverage. He noted that in the Swedish foreign ministry, believing that foreign criticism was amplifying or even distorting the significance of some issues in the political discourse, summoned 150 correspondents of the foreign press corps to receive what The New York Times described as "a lecture on their supposedly less-than-objective articles about Sweden." He wrote that the strategy backfired, as the journalists felt curtailed.

As Sweden's international visibility has increased a market for Sweden-bashing has emerged.

Japanese Sweden-bashing often focus on the care of the elderly.

== Discussion among politicians and government officials ==
According to political scientist Bruce Miroff, American conservatives may engage in Sweden-bashing as Sweden managed to have both economic efficiency and equality, something they feel is impossible.

In a February 2016 report to the Swedish Foreign Ministry, the Swedish Embassy in London indicated that the widely distributed "right-wing UK tabloid newspaper", the Daily Mail, said to be known for its "vigorous anti-immigration stance", was running a campaign against Sweden's refugee policy. The report said that Sweden was being used as a deterrent and an argument against allowing more refugees, and was being characterised by the Daily Mail as "naive and an example of the negative consequences of a liberal migration policy."

In mid-January 2017, Czechoslovakia-born Swedish author Katerina Janouch made claims in an interview with a Czech television station which the Swedish government labelled as a "bizarre declaration". Janouch said that "Swedes were learning to use guns to defend themselves as a result of increased immigration," that Swedish seniors do not have enough money for food, cancer patients were dying because of the long waiting lines caused by tens of thousands newly arrived refugees—77% of whom are men pretending to be minors—women are being raped, and 150,000 left Sweden for the United States and elsewhere. Swedish Prime Minister Stefan Löfven spoke of "increasing negative media coverage abroad" at Davos and in interviews with the local Swedish media with reassurances that there was still "great respect for the Swedish model'.

After Donald Trump claimed at a 2017 rally that Sweden had serious crime and social problems related to immigrants, Olle Lönnaeus published an article in Sydsvenskan accusing Trump of spreading fake news, and said that "[a]s Trump wants to close the US border to Muslim immigration, it is in his interest to spread the idea that Europe's most refugee friendly country is on the road to perdition." In response, Jimmie Åkesson and Mattias Karlsson of the far-right, anti-immigrant Sweden Democrats party published an op-ed in The Wall Street Journal arguing that Trump had understated Sweden's problems, not exaggerated them, and that riots, attacks on emergency service personnel, gang violence, gun violence, and anti-Semitism were booming as a result of immigration. Reacting to the editorial, Sweden's justice and migration minister Morgan Johansson accused Åkesson and Karlsson of lying about the immigrant crime situation, saying "They're painting a picture of a country characterized by violence, when it's the exact opposite."

During the COVID-19 pandemic Donald Trump claimed that Sweden was suffering greatly from the situation and that had US followed the same strategy as Sweden, there would have been significantly more deaths in the US. Despite the fact that Trump himself downplayed the dangers of the virus in the beginning of the pandemic, advocating for a more calm approach. The Swedish state epidemiologist Anders Tegnell has responded to the critique by saying that the comments made by Trump are not to be taken seriously and that by doing the comparison between Sweden and the city of New York, Sweden is still doing comparatively good.

Eurosceptic politician Nigel Farage has consistently criticised Sweden in similar rhetoric to Trump, making references to refugees, immigrants and violent crime.

The former ambassador from Israel Zvi Mazel consistently criticized Sweden for lacking press freedom.

== Discussion among journalists and other commentators ==
At a 2016 discussion forum titled "Transnationalizing Swedish–American Relations", Carl Marklund, a postdoctoral researcher in Eastern European studies at Södertörn University, argued that Swedish conservatives had been influenced by American criticism of the Swedish welfare state in the 1970s and 80s. Marklund said that Swedes had "used the United States as a source of inspiration as well as a warning, seeking not primarily to understand the United States but to promote or prevent social change in Sweden." Furthermore, Marklund argued, Sweden was viewed similarly by Americans, "as both a model and a dangerous example of a welfare state." Marklund referred to this as "Sweden-bashing".

The term has also been used by journalists and by Swedish government officials discussing Swedish foreign relations, as well as by other commentators. In a 2002 opinion article in New York Times Magazine, progressive economist Paul Krugman used the term "Sweden-bashing" in arguing that American conservatives attacked Swedish welfare policies as part of an effort to spread a misguided view that redistribution of wealth to poorer citizens promotes economic inefficiency. Krugman argued that one influential conservative economic critique of Swedish policy was misguided because it focused on per-capita income, which Krugman argued was not a good measure of quality of life in Sweden, and because high wealth inequality in the United States skewed the available data.

In an editorial titled "Political Strategy Behind Sweden-Bashing" in the daily newspaper Sydsvenskan, Joakim Palmkvist and Olle Lonnaeus identified possible political motives that might explain some Israeli criticism of Swedish press freedoms, such as a desire by the critics to gain domestic support, to pressure Sweden as chairman of the European Union in advance of coming peace talks on the Palestinian conflict, or even to prompt a press crackdown by the Swedish government.

According to government agency Swedish Institute, while much of the foreign media reporting on how Sweden was to handle so many migrants at one time was accurate, some people with a political agenda turned to Sweden-bashing. Sweden-bashing peaked again in 2016 as foreign media criticized Sweden's open immigration policies as swelling numbers of displaced peoples, refugee, and asylum seekers—many of whom had Sweden as their destination—travelled to Sweden via other European countries.

According to Christian Christensen, an American professor of journalism at Stockholm University, Sweden have become the symbol of everything that many American Republicans believe is wrong with Europe: feminism, environmentalism, and openness to refugees. Donald Trump has been criticized for engaging in the hard-core American right's Sweden-bashing.

== See also ==
- Swedish-Americans
- Last night in Sweden
- Crime in Sweden
- Suecophile
