= Suecophile =

Someone with an affinity for Swedish culture and language

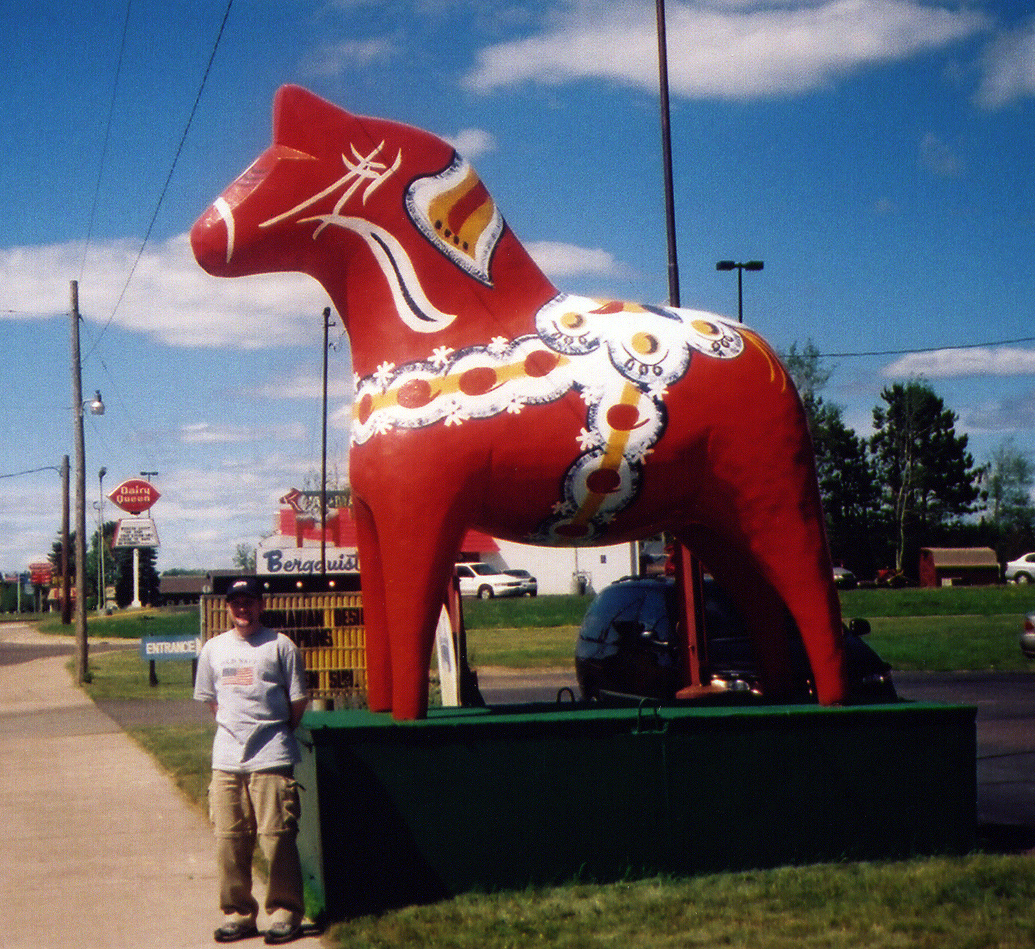
A Dalecarlian horse, a traditional symbol for Swedish folk culture, in Cloquet, Minnesota

A Suecophile is someone, typically a non-Swede, with a great interest in the culture and language of Sweden. The word Swedophile is sometimes used with the same meaning, likely based on the English "Sweden" instead of Latin "Suecia". The last part of the word is the Greek -phil-, often used in these kinds of terms.

In the language debate in Finland in the 19th and 20th centuries, the Svecoman movement was formed by those who preferred the Swedish language to the Finnish language. The word Suecophile is, however, more commonly used in non-political contexts.

A well-known American Suecophile of the 19th century was William Widgery Thomas Jr., who was US minister to Sweden and wrote the book Sweden and the Swedes in 1892, de facto promoting a better understanding and acting towards Swedish immigrants to the US around the end of the 19th century.

Sweden Hills, located in the Hokkaido prefecture of Japan, is a village inspired by idyllic Swedish towns. It is home to around 400 permanent residents as well as several hundred who vacation in the village, where the population have also embraced the Swedish language and traditions.

The opposite of Suecophilia is Sweden-bashing.

== See also ==
- Bullerby syndrome
- IKEA
- Scandinavian design
- Swedish Cultural Center
- Swedish cuisine
- Swedish diaspora
- Swedish festivities
- Sweden Hills
