= Swedish National Council for Crime Prevention =

Swedish administrative authority

- Brottsförebyggande rådet (Brå)

Agency overview
- Formed: 1974
- Headquarters: Stockholm, Sweden
- Employees: 100
- Minister responsible: Gunnar Strömmer (Minister for Justice)
- Agency executive: Mattias Larsson (Director General)
- Parent department: Ministry of Justice
- Website: bra.se

The Swedish National Council for Crime Prevention (Swedish: Brottsförebyggande rådet, Brå) is a Swedish government agency organized under the Ministry of Justice, and acts as a center for research and development within the judicial system.

Brå primarily works to reduce crime and improve levels of safety in society by producing data and disseminating knowledge on crime and crime prevention work. The Council also produces Sweden's official crime statistics, evaluates reforms, conducts research to develop new knowledge and provides support to local crime prevention work. The results of Brå's work are a basis for decision makers within the judicial system, the Riksdag and the Government. Brå often works in collaboration with other organisations and public sector agencies.

== See also ==
- Crime in Sweden
