= Fight or Flight =

The fight-or-flight response is a biological response of humans and other animals to acute stressors.

Fight or Flight may also refer to:

- Fight or Flight (2007 film), a documentary film
- Fight or Flight (2025 film), a British action film
- Fight or Flight, a 1996 book documenting battles from the soldier's perspective by military historian Geoffrey Regan

== Music ==
- Fight or Flight (EP), a 2000 EP by Turin Brakes
- Fight or Flight (Emily Osment album)
- Fight or Flight, a 2020 Conan Gray song from his debut album, Kid Krow
- Fight or Flight (Hoobastank album), 2012
- Fight or Flight?, a 2006 album by Canadian jazz and soul vocalist Kellylee Evans
- Fight or Flight (band), American hard rock band
- "Fight or Flight", a song on the Turtle Pals Tapes Friday Night Funkin' Vs Sonic.EXE soundtrack album, by ChurgneyGurgney, 2022

== Television ==
- "Fight or Flight" (Big Love), a 2009 episode
- "Fight or Flight" (Blood & Oil), a 2015 episode
- "Fight or Flight" (Burn Notice), a 2007 episode
- "Fight or Flight" (Heroes), a 2007 episode
- "Fight or Flight" (Modern Family), a 2015 episode
- "Fight or Flight" (The Punisher), a 2019 episode
- "Fight or Flight" (QI), a 2009 episode
- "Fight or Flight" (Star Trek: Enterprise), a 2001 episode
- "Fight or Flight" (Supergirl), a 2015 episode
