= National Centre for Knowledge on Men's Violence against Women =

The National Centre for Knowledge on Men's Violence against Women (Swedish: Nationellt centrum för kvinnofrid, abbreviated NCK) is a Swedish knowledge and resource centre at Uppsala University, founded in 2006. NCK is working on behalf of the Government of Sweden to raise awareness at the national level of men's violence against women, and develops new methods for the treatment of abused women. NCK has a mandate to research, educate, compile and spread information. In 2008, its operations expanded to include violence and oppression in the name of honour, and violence in same-sex relationships.

== Organisation ==
The centre is part of Uppsala University, organised directly under the rector, and managed by Professor Gun Heimer.

== Telephone counseling ==
Since 2007, the centre have been operating a Government funded national helpline for women who have been subjected to threats and violence (Swedish: Kvinnofridslinjen). The telephone counseling is open 24-hour, toll-free, and the call does not appear on the telephone bill. Staff at the helpline provide support, practical advice, information about the healthcare system and how to report crimes. The staff consist of social workers, midwives and nurses with at least five years of professional experience; receiving on average 60 calls a day.

== See also ==
- Violence against women
- Rape in Sweden
