= Sweden Hills =

Swedish-style village in Japan

Coordinates: 43.21282°N 141.46453°E

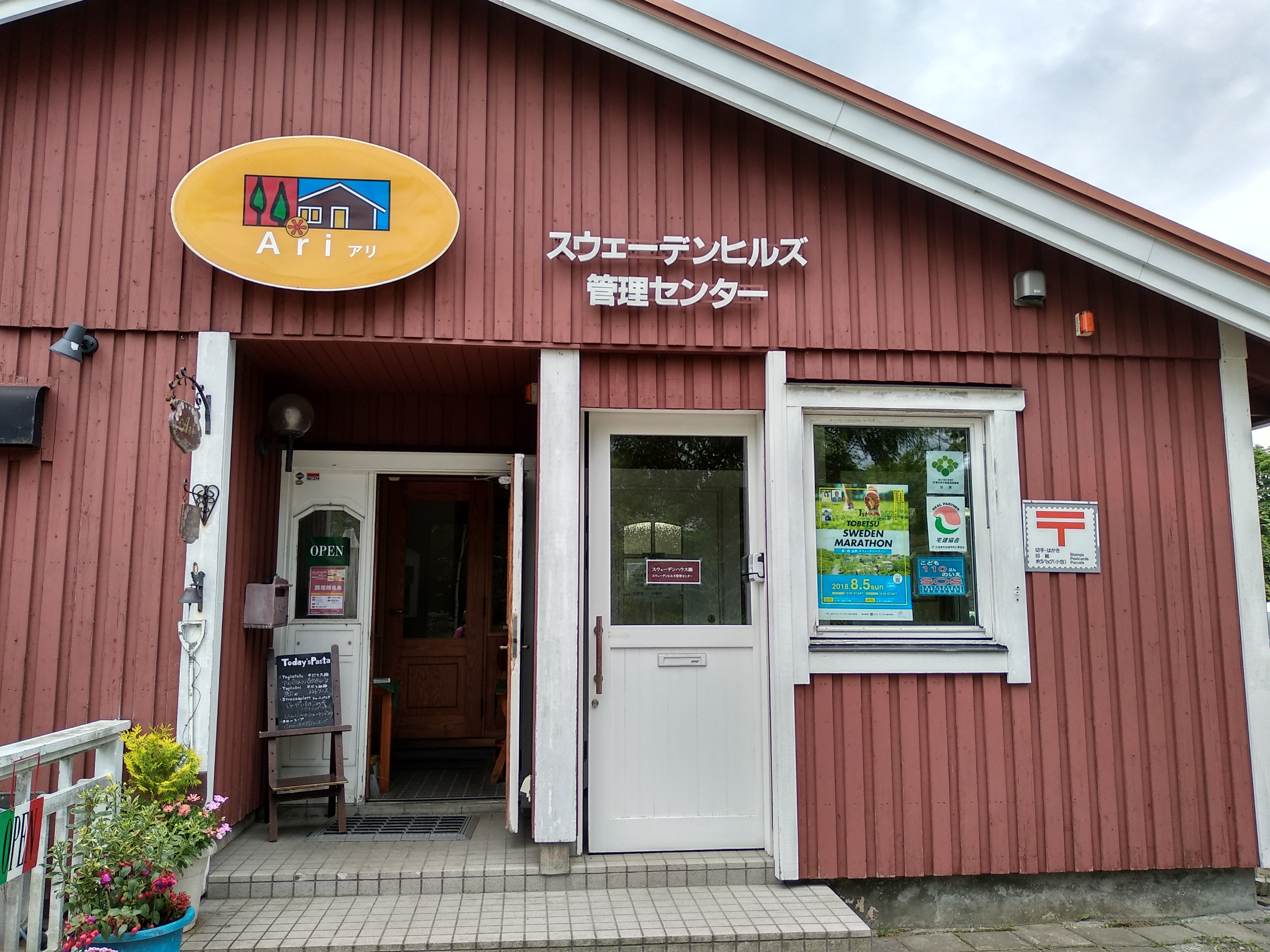
Sweden Hills Management Centre in Tobetsu Town, Hokkaido, Japan

Sweden Hills (スウェーデンヒルズ, Suwēden Hiruzu) is a Swedish-style village in Tōbetsu, Hokkaidō in Japan.

The houses are wooden and painted falu red. The idea of a Swedish-style village came when a Swedish ambassador visited the nearby town center of Tobetsu and thought that the climate was quite similar to the Swedish climate. Construction of the village started in 1984. The Swedish holiday of the Midsummer festival is one of the traditions celebrated annually in the town, for this, the residents dress up and wear traditional Swedish clothes. There is also a Swedish kräftskiva (crayfish party) in August.

The Sweden Hills Golf Club is located nearby.

== See also ==
- Bullerby syndrome
- Suecophile
