= Swedish Crime Victim Authority =

The Swedish Crime Victim Authority (Swedish: Brottsoffermyndigheten) is a Swedish government agency which provides compensation and support for victims of crime. It is located in Umeå and has nationwide responsibility for three areas:

== Victim injury compensation ==
If the offenders have no ability to pay damages and if there is no insurance for the damage, the victim may be entitled to Victim injury compensation of state resources. The right may exist even if the perpetrator is unknown. The allowance compensates primarily personal injury and violation.

== Victims Fund ==
The fund is distributed for research and other victim-oriented projects driven in a non-profit, public or private. The fund is built up mainly by a special fee of 1 000 SEK each convicted person must pay if the crime is punishable by a fine sentence. Distributed annually about 40 million from the Fund.

== Learning Center ==
Victim Agency will gather and disseminate information and research to help improve treatment and treatment of victims. It is bl. a. the information to other authorities, NGOs and victims. Brottsoffermyndigheten also arranges conferences, theme days and courses.

== See also ==
- Crime in Sweden
