= Forskning och framsteg =

Popular science magazine in Sweden

- Categories: Popular science magazine
- Frequency: Eight times per year
- Founded: 1966
- Country: Sweden
- Based in: Stockholm
- Language: Swedish
- Website: FoF
- ISSN: 0015-7937
- OCLC: 938273407

Forskning och framsteg (Swedish: Research and Progress; abbreviated as FoF) is a popular science magazine based in Stockholm, Sweden. It has been published since 1966.

== History and profile ==
The magazine was launched in Stockholm in 1966. The publisher was Sällskapet för forskninginformation. It was published on a bimonthly basis from its start in 1966 to 1968. FoF was then published ten times per year. The frequency was switched to eight times annually. The magazine is financed by the Swedish Research Council and other Swedish research foundations such as Natur & Kultur.

The contributors of FoF are mostly scholars or scientific journalists, and the magazine features interviews with researchers in addition to regular articles and other material. It frequently publishes articles on natural sciences, medical sciences and other science related topics.
