= Carlo Buongiorno =

Italian aerospace engineer

- Born: 12 March 1930; Rome, Italy
- Died: 26 November 2011 (aged 81); Castel Cellesi, Italy
- Education: Sapienza University of Rome

Carlo Buongiorno (12 March 1930 – 26 November 2011) was an Italian aerospace engineer, first Director of the Italian Space Agency and professor at the Sapienza University, in Rome. He was a pivotal figure in the Italian space program.

== Life ==
Buongiorno was a student and collaborator of professor Luigi Broglio: he graduated in electronic and aerospace engineering at Sapienza University of Rome. In 1954, he became a researcher at the NYU Tandon School of Engineering, at the time led by Antonio Ferri, where, he studied on both supersonic and hypersonic spaceflight.

After returning to Italy in 1957, he taught aerospace propulsion at the School of Aerospace Engineering of Sapienza University, in the department of mechanics and dipartimento di meccanica e astronautics. In collaboration with NASA, he participated in the first launches of sounding rocket at the training shooting range of Salto di Quirra, in Sardinia.

Starting from 1961, he was part of the San Marco programme, a cooperation between Italy and the United States which led to orbiting the first Italian satellite, the San Marco 1, in December 1964. He altro contributed to the design and the realization of the oceanic launch base Broglio Space Center (at the time, San Marco Equatorial Range) in Kenya, a project he coordinated between 1960 and 1978.

He was involved in the scientific and technical group that founded the European Space Agency (ESA), founded in 1975 as ESRO, of which he led the Italian delegation in the agency's council until 1990.

From 1988 to 1993 he was the first director of the newly founded Italian Space Agency (ASI). He was awarded the Frank J. Malina Astronautics Medal by the International Astronautical Federation in 2001 for his contributions.

He died in 2011, at the age of 81, in his home in Castel Cellesi.

== See also ==
- San Marco programme
- Luigi Broglio

== Bibliography ==
- Ferrone, Enrico (2011). Carlo Buongiorno Lo spazio di una vita. Vicchio, Italy: LoGisma Editore.
