= Italian Space Agency =

Italian government agency

- Agenzia Spaziale Italiana

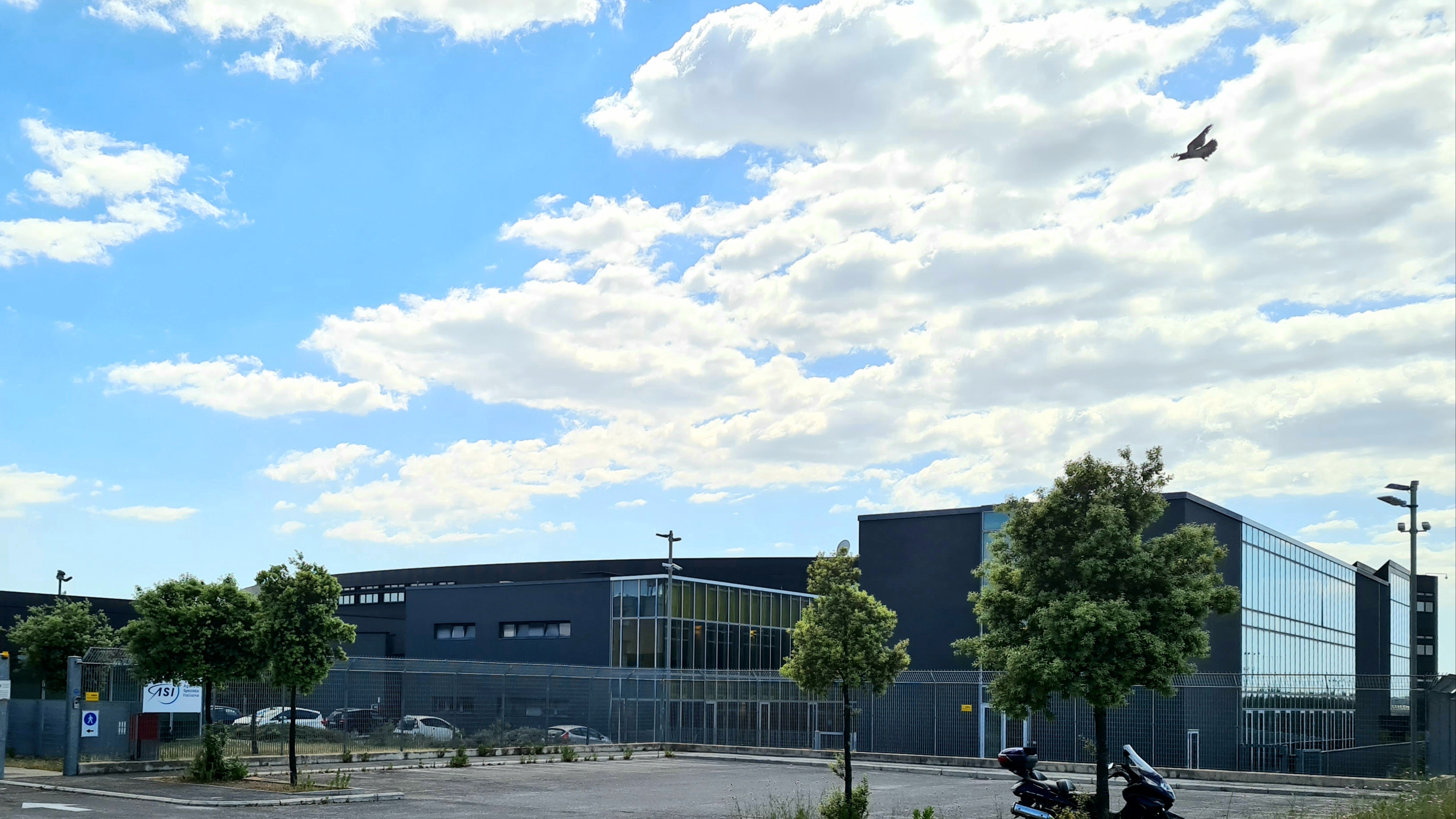
- Headquarters in Rome

Agency overview
- Formed: 1 January 1988; 38 years ago
- Jurisdiction: Italian government
- Headquarters: Rome, Italy
- Employees: 200
- Annual budget: €2.0 billion ($2.1 billion) in 2020
- Agency executives: Elda Turco Bulgherini, President (ad interim); Luca Vincenzo Maria Salamone, General Manager
- Website: www.asi.it

The Italian Space Agency (Italian: Agenzia Spaziale Italiana; ASI) is a government agency established in 1988 to fund, regulate and coordinate space exploration activities in Italy. The agency cooperates with numerous national and international entities who are active in aerospace research and technology.

Nationally, the ASI is responsible for both drafting the National Aerospace Plan and ensuring it is carried out. To do this the agency operates as the owner/coordinator of a number of Italian space research agencies and assets such as CIRA as well as organising the calls and opportunities process for Italian industrial contractors on spaceflight projects. Internationally, the ASI provides Italy's delegation to the Council of the European Space Agency and to its subordinate bodies as well as representing the country's interests in foreign collaborations.

ASI's main headquarters are located in Rome, Italy, and the agency also has direct control over two operational centres: the Centre for Space Geodesy (CGS) located in Matera in Italy, and its own spaceport, the Broglio Space Centre (formerly the San Marco Equatorial Range) on the coastal sublittoral of Kenya, currently used only as a communications ground station. One further balloon launch base located in Trapani was permanently closed in 2010. In 2020, ASI's annual revenues budget was approximately €2.0 billion and it directly employed around 200 workers.

Italia pavilion (organized by: Italian Trade Agency) at 9th Bengaluru Space Expo 2026, BIEC

== History ==
=== Early Italian aerospace ===
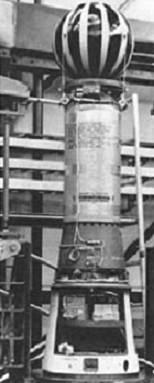
San Marco 1 (top), Italy's first artificial satellite, at checkout on Wallops Island

Activities started officially in 1988 but the agency drew extensively on the work of earlier national organisations as well as the consolidated experience of the many Italian scientists that had been investigating space and astronautics since the end of the 19th century. Some of the most outstanding names in Italian space exploration since its inception were the following:

- Giulio Costanzi (1875–1965), his 1914 writing of space navigation is considered the first Italian contribution to astronautics.
- Luigi Gussalli (1885–1950), astronautics pioneer since the 1920s, corresponded with international space scientists such as Oberth and Goddard. He invented a double-reaction jet engine, developed multi-stage rockets, suggested a Moon mission and solar radiation powered spaceships.
- Gaetano Arturo Crocco (1877-1968), aeronautics and astronautics pioneer, invented the first all-Italian liquid-fuelled combustion chamber and aided in the development of the gravity assist technique for use on planetary fly-by's by space probes.
- Luigi Crocco (1909-1986), son of Gaetano Arturo, an internationally renowned scientist in aerodynamics theory and jet propulsion.
- Aurelio Robotti (1913–1994), expert on rocket liquid fuels, father of the first Italian liquid-fuelled rocket, AR3.
- Luigi Broglio (1911-2001), the unanimously recognized father of Italian astronautics, sometimes referred to as the "Italian von Braun". Under his guidance Italy built and operated a satellite in orbit around the Earth and became the first country to deploy an equatorial launching pad, the San Marco, and to experiment successful launching from it.
- Carlo Buongiorno (1930–2011), Broglio's pupil and the first director general of ASI.

=== San Marco programme ===
Early Italian space efforts during the Space Race era were built around cooperation between the Italian Space Commission (a branch of the National Research Council) and NASA supported primarily by the Centro Ricerche Aerospaziali, the aerospace research group of the University of Rome La Sapienza. This plan, conceived by Luigi Broglio, led to the San Marco programme of Italian-built satellites beginning with the launch of Italy's first satellite, San Marco 1, from Wallops Island.

The San Marco project since 1967 was focused on the launching of scientific satellites by Scout rockets from a mobile rigid platform located close to the equator. This station, composed of 3 oil platforms and two logistical support boats, was installed off the Kenya coast, close to the town of Malindi.

Italy would later launch further satellites in the series (San Marco 2 in 1967, San Marco 3 in 1971, San Marco 4 in 1974 and San Marco D/L in 1988 ) using the American Scout rockets like the original, but from its own spaceport.

=== Co-operation and consolidation ===
As one of the earliest countries to be engaged in space exploration, Italy became a founder and key partner in the European Launcher Development Organisation (ELDO) and the European Space Research Organisation (ESRO), established on 29 March and 14 June 1962 respectively. Both of these would later merge to form the European Space Agency on 30 April 1975.

Further work would continue under the direction of the National Research Council including the launch of an indigenous telecoms/research satellite called SIRIO-1 in 1977. A planned follow-up mission SIRIO-2 was destroyed in the Ariane 1 L-05 launch failure. During the 1980s, it became clear of the need to rationalise and strengthen Italy's position in space research and so the decision was made to create the Italian Space Agency to further coordinate the nation's space activities.

== Robotic exploration ==
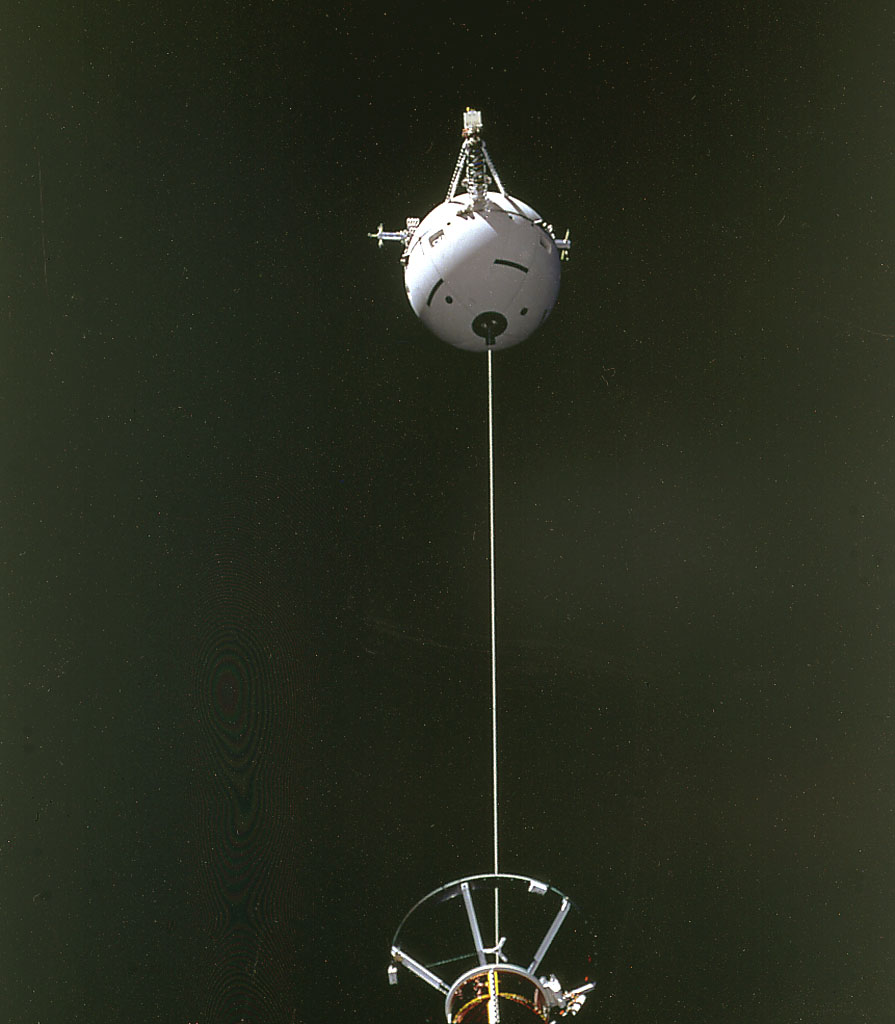
TSS-1, a tethered satellite, being deployed on STS-46

ASI's first large scientific satellite mission was BeppoSAX, developed in collaboration with the Netherlands and launched in 1996. Named after Giuseppe “Beppo” Occhialini, an important figure in Italian high-energy physics, the satellite was a mission to study the universe in the X-ray part of the spectrum.

Following on from this ASI developed another high-energy astronomical satellite, AGILE for gamma ray astronomy, launched by the Indian Space Research Organisation (ISRO) in 2007. A particular innovation was the use of a single instrument to measure both Gamma rays and hard X-rays.

ASI also has collaborated on many major international space exploration missions including;

- Cassini-Huygens, a joint NASA/ESA/ASI mission to the Saturn system launched in 1997. The mission has made many new discoveries and increased understanding of the gas giant's environment, particularly Saturn's varied moons. ASI supplied Cassini's large high-gain antenna and radar package as well as involvement in other instruments.
- INTEGRAL, ESA's advanced gamma ray observatory launched in 2002.
- Mars Express, the first Western European mission to Mars launched in 2003. Through ASI, Italy provided two important instruments for the mission; MARSIS a radar altimeter and the Planetary Fourier Spectrometer which discovered concentrations of methane in the Martian atmosphere.
- Rosetta, an ambitious ESA mission to orbit and for the first time in history land a probe on a comet, 67P/Churyumov-Gerasimenko, to study it in detail as it enters the inner solar system. This long duration mission was launched in 2004 and arrived at its destination in 2014. Rosetta carries the Italian-built VIRTIS instrument while the Philae Lander's sampling/drilling system, SD2, is another major Italian contribution.
- Swift Gamma-Ray Burst Mission, a NASA-led international mission to provide rapid detection of short-lived Gamma-ray Bursts. ASI provides the use of the ground station facility as the San Marco spaceport.
- Mars Reconnaissance Orbiter, a NASA mission to Mars launched in 2005. The SHARAD radar was supplied by Italy using experience from MARSIS.
- Venus Express, the sister-probe to Mars Express built using the same spacecraft bus and the first Western European mission to Venus. Launched in 2005, ASI contributed a version of VIRTIS spectrometer.
- Dawn, a 2007 NASA mission that will study the largest of the Asteroid Belt's objects, the asteroid Vesta and the dwarf planet Ceres. Italy has provided VIR-MS, another evolution of the VIRTIS instrument.
- Juno, contributed the Jovian Infrared Auroral Mapper on this mission to planet Jupiter.
- Double Asteroid Redirection Test (DART), a NASA mission to test planetary defense by crashing toward an asteroid, small spacecraft called LICIACube created by ASI will observe the result. LICIACube is the first autonomous spacecraft developed by Italian team in deep space.

Italy's space industry has also been involved in many other scientific missions such as SOHO, Cluster II, ISO, XMM-Newton and Planck. The technology experiments TSS-1 and TSS-1R were also conducted in partnership with NASA.

== Launcher development ==
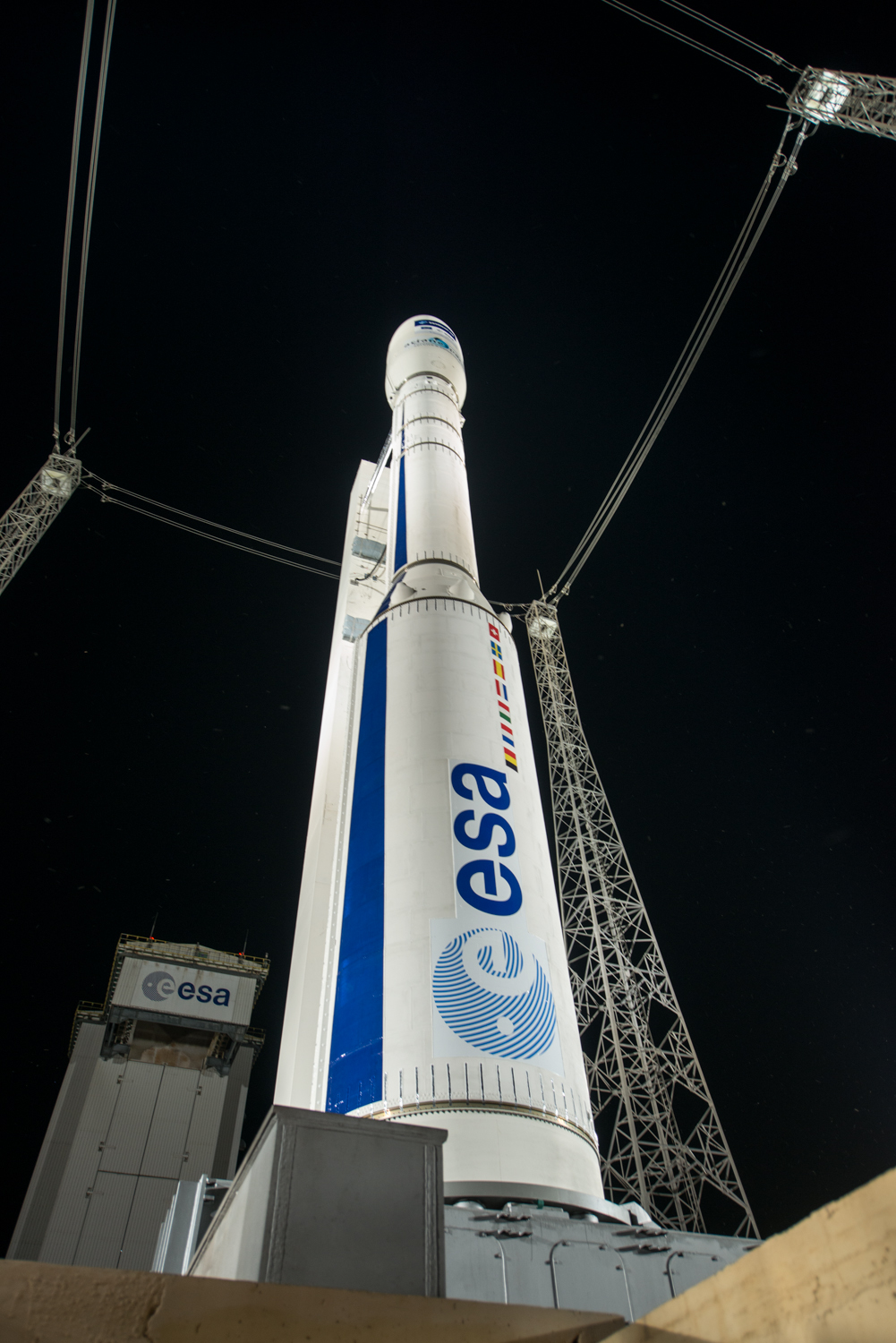
Vega rocket

Currently ASI is a partner in the Ariane 5 launcher programme and more recently is the major (65%) backer of the ESA Vega small launcher, capable of putting a payload of 1500 kg to low Earth orbit.

== Earth observation ==
ASI is a participant in many of ESA's programmes in the field of Earth Observation such as ERS-1, ERS-2, ENVISAT, the Meteosat series and the Galileo satellite navigation system. The agency has also collaborated with other European and international partners such as the Shuttle Radar Topography Mission with NASA.

In October 1992, NASA launched LAGEOS-2 (following LAGEOS-1 launched in 1976) in cooperation with ASI. A passive satellite, it is an aluminum plated brass sphere covered with retroreflectors to reflect laser ranging beams emitted from ground stations on Earth. The primary mission goals were to determine accurately Earth's Geoid and to measure Tectonic plate movement. In 2012 ASI's own satellite LARES (LARES 1) was launched using the Vega rocket. The mission carries out similar studies to that of LAGEOS 2 but with much greater precision. Another similar satellite, LARES 2 was launched in 2022.

The Italian Space Agency, under direction of both the Ministry of Research and the Ministry of Defence, developed the COSMO-SkyMed constellation of satellites for both military and civilian use in a broad range of areas.

The Italian Space Agency launched in 2019 the multimission program PLATiNO (mini Piattaforma spaziaLe ad Alta TecNOlogia, High-Technology Mini-Satellite Platform), to develop industrial capability in the small satellites sector. The first mission in 2023 will embark a SAR, the second one in 2024 a Thermal Infrared Imager.

== Human spaceflight ==
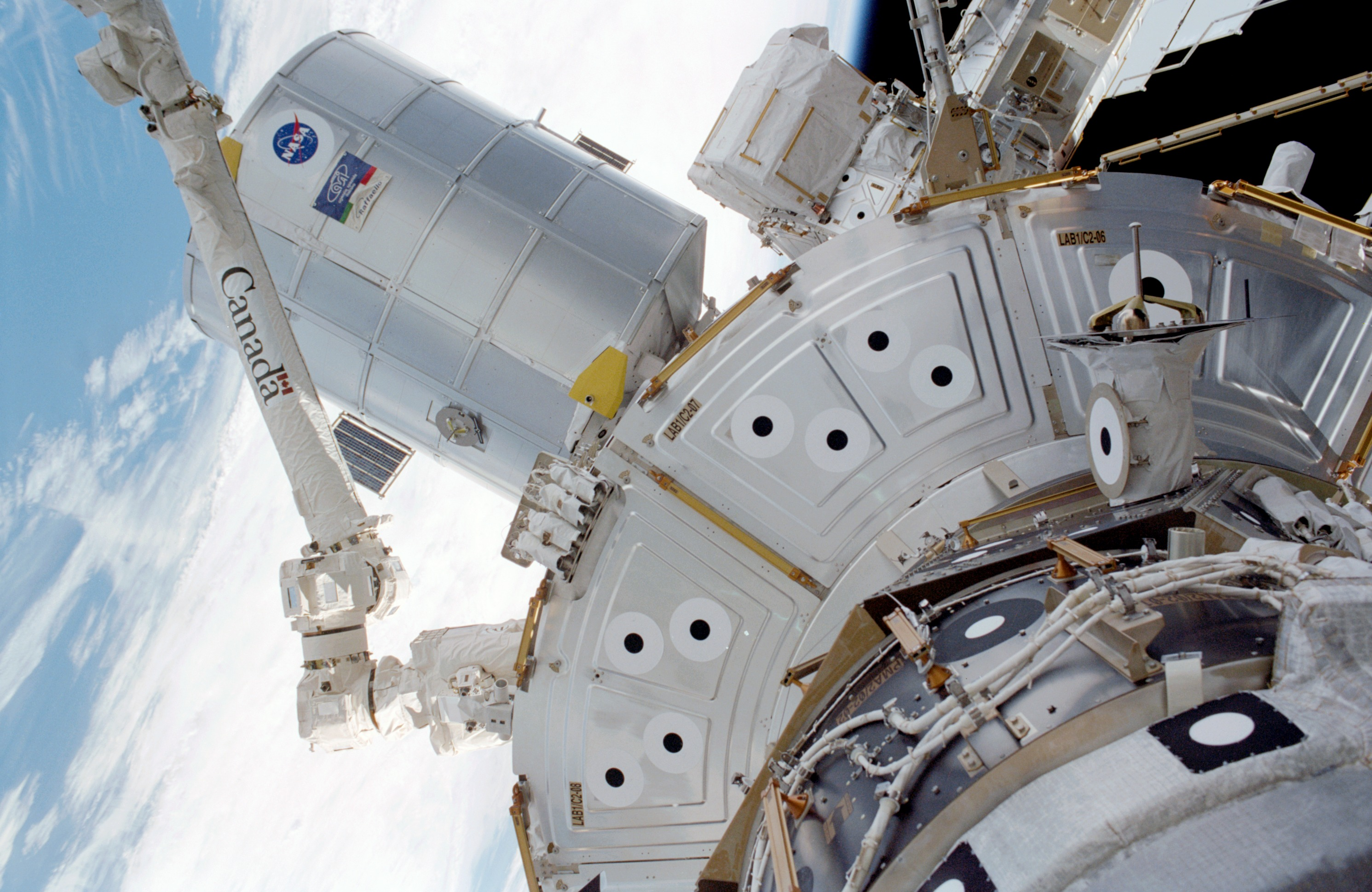
Raffaello, upper left, docked with ISS during STS-114

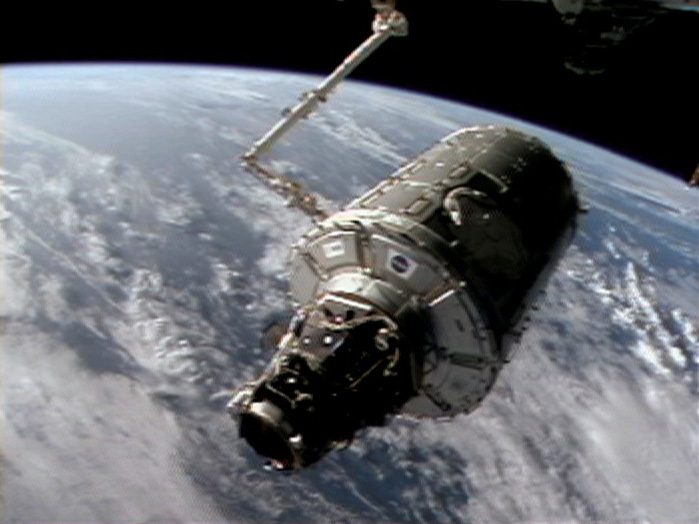
Harmony, manufactured in Italy, was accompanied by Nespoli who acted as mission specialist

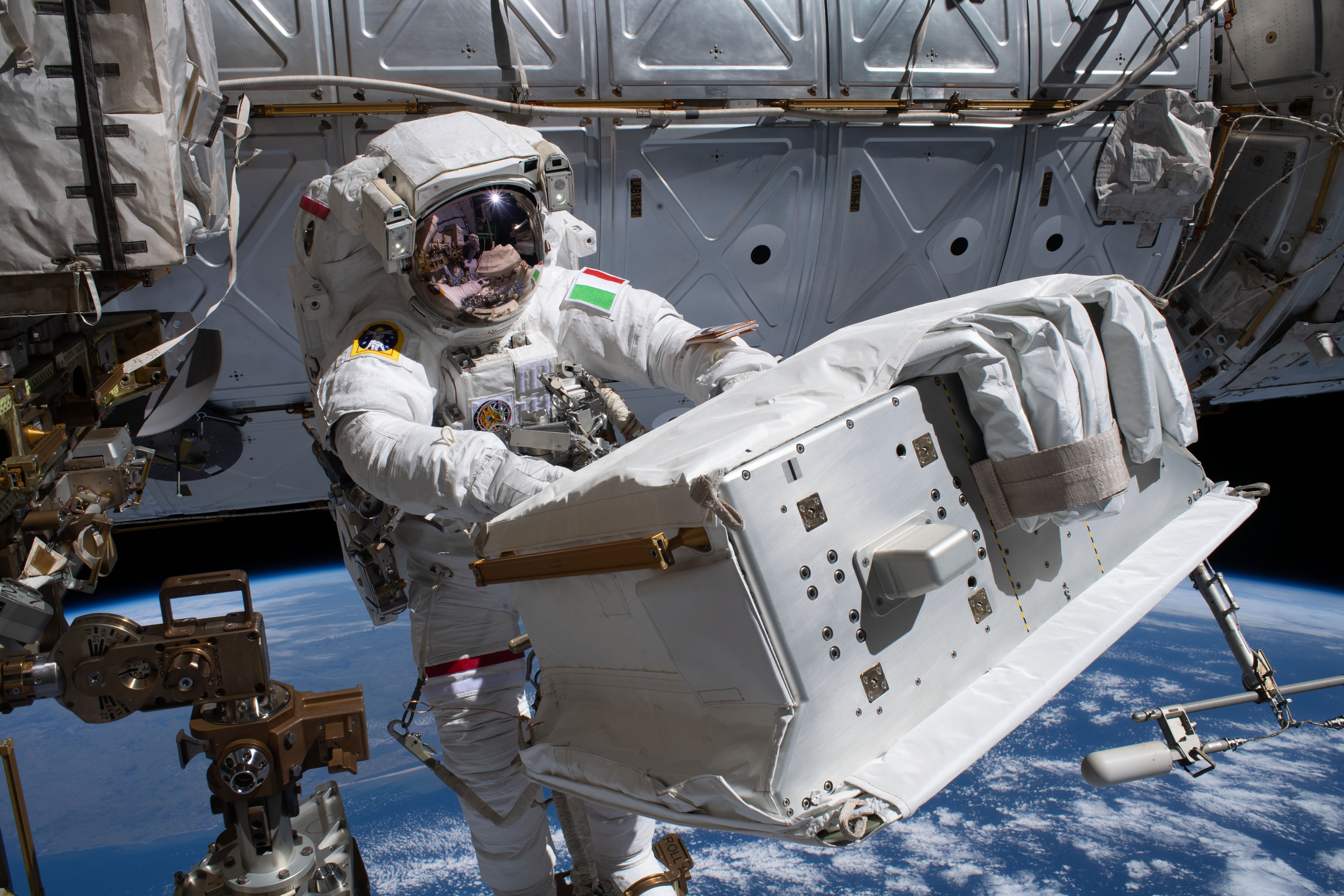
Luca Parmitano carries a new thermal pump system for AMS

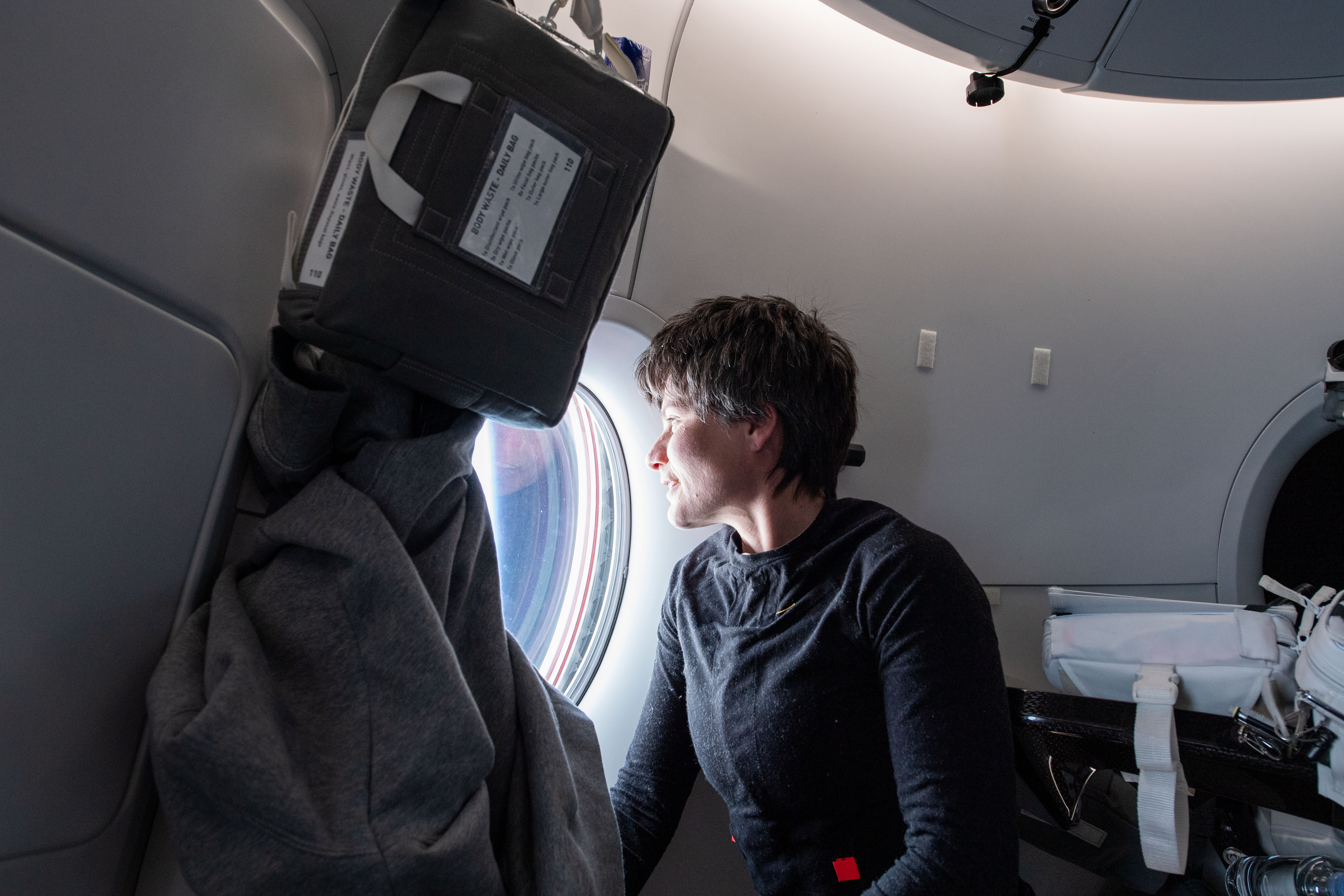
Samantha Cristoforetti looking out the SpaceX Dragon Freedom spacecraft

Through ASI, the Italian space industry is an active player in human spaceflight activities.

The three Space Shuttle Multi-Purpose Logistics Module cargo containers Leonardo, Raffaello and Donatello, were manufactured at the Cannes Mandelieu Space Center in Turin, Italy by Alcatel Alenia Space, now Thales Alenia Space. They provide a key function in storing equipment and parts for transfer to the International Space Station.

A number of ISS modules have also been made in Italy. As part of ESA's contribution to the costs of the International Space Station, Alcatel Alenia Space manufactured Tranquility, Harmony as well as the Cupola observation deck for NASA.

ESA's Columbus module, Western Europe's primary scientific lab on board the ISS, was again built in Turin based on Italy's previous experience in space station module construction.

=== Italian astronauts ===
As an ESA member heavily involved in human spaceflight, ASI sponsors a select few Italian citizens to train at ESA's European Astronaut Corps (EAC) to represent the country on missions. Italians to have flown in space are:

- Franco Malerba, Italy's first astronaut and the only one not to fly as a member of the EAC. He flew on STS-46 (31 July to 7 August 1992) as payload specialist on the first Tethered Satellite System mission.
- Umberto Guidoni, flew on STS-75 (22 February to 9 March 1996) as payload specialist on the second Tethered Satellite System mission - TSS-1R. He became the first Italian and European on the International Space Station during STS-100 (19 April to 1 May 2001).
- Maurizio Cheli, flew with Umberto Guidoni as a mission specialist on STS-75.
- Roberto Vittori, has flown on multiple missions to the ISS: Soyuz TM-33, Soyuz TM-34, Soyuz TMA-5, Soyuz TMA-6 and STS-134.
- Paolo A. Nespoli, flew on STS-120 (23 October to 7 November 2007), he then returned two more times on the ISS: one for the long duration MagISStra mission (Expedition 26/27, from 15 December 2010, to 23 May 2011) aboard the Soyuz TMA-20 and the other for the Vita mission (Expedition 52/53)
- Luca Parmitano, selected in February 2009, flew aboard Soyuz TMA-09M on 28 May 2013, arriving at the International Space Station the following day. He returned to Earth on 11 November 2013. He returned to the ISS on board the Soyuz MS-13 mission from 20 July 2019 to 6 February 2020. During this time he served as Flight Engineer on Expedition 60 and Commander on Expedition 61.
- Samantha Cristoforetti, also selected in 2009, flew to the International Space Station aboard Soyuz TMA-15M on 23 November 2014. Her original return date was delayed by one month after the failure of two Russian rockets extended her stay in space past the European astronaut and female astronaut endurance records. Her return to Earth, on 11 June 2015, concluded her 199d 16h 42m in space. She was on the ISS with Expedition 67 from 27 April 2022 as a part of SpaceX Crew-4 mission and took command of ISS Expedition 68 from 28 September 2022 to 14 October 2022, when she returned to Earth aboard Crew Dragon Endurance.

== See also ==
- List of government space agencies
- List of space agencies
- List of Italian astronauts

== Bibliography ==
- Filippo Graziani, La Scuola di Scuola Ingegneria Aerospaziale nell’ottantesimo anniversario della sua fondazione
- Gaetano Arturo Crocco, Giro esplorativo di un anno Terra-Marte-Venere-Terra, Rendiconti del VII Congresso Internazionale Astronauticao, Roma, settembre 1956, pagg. 201–225;

English translation: "One-Year Exploration-Trip Earth-Mars-Venus-Earth, " Gaetano A. Crocco, paper presented at the Seventh Congress of the International Astronautical Federation, Rome, Italy, Rendiconti pp. 227-252.

- Giorgio Di Bernardo, Nella nebbia in attesa del Sole, Di Renzo Editore
- AA. VV:, Le attività spaziali italiane dal dopoguerra all’istituzione dell’Agenzia Spaziale Italiana, Agenzia Spaziale Europea
- Aurelio Robotti, 1941–1961, venti anni di storia missilistica in Italia, "Missili" Edizioni Italiane, 1962
- Giovanni Caprara, L’Italia nello spazio, Valerio Levi Editore, 1992
