= Kenya Space Agency =

Kenya's space agency

Coordinates: 1.2885306°S 36.8008056°E

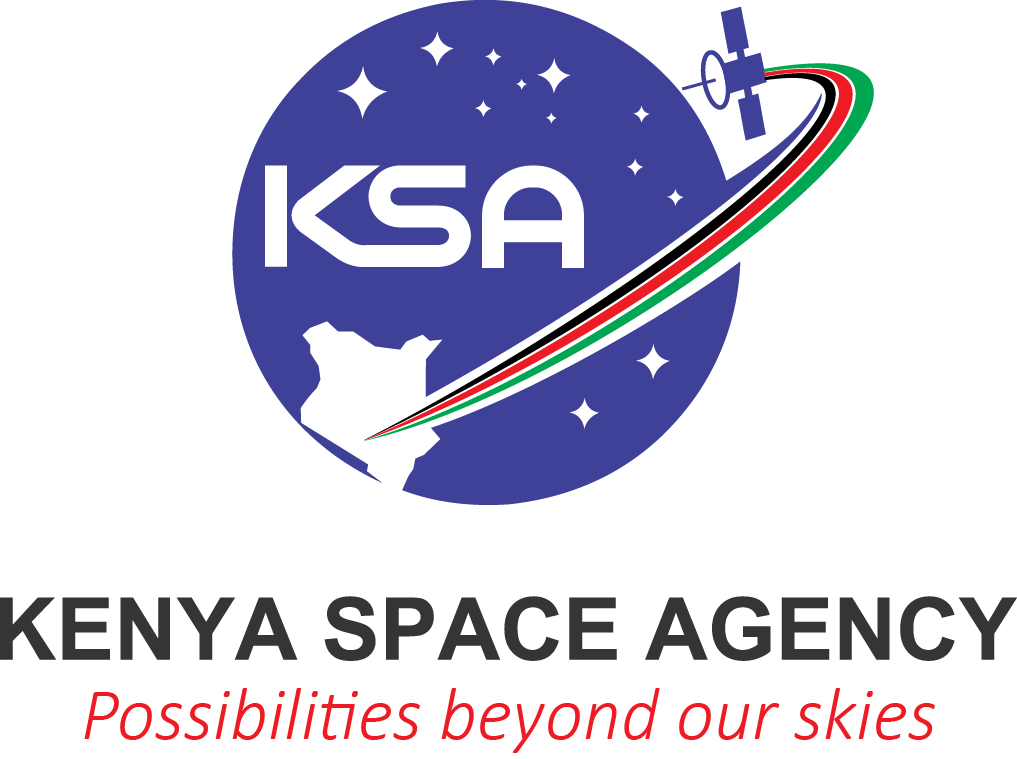

Agency overview
- Abbreviation: KSA
- Formed: 7 March 2017; 9 years ago
- Type: Space agency
- Headquarters: Pitman House, Jakaya Kikwete Road
- Motto: Possibilities beyond our skies
- Chairman: Maj Gen (Rtd) Jofidha Otieno Makowenga
- Director General: Major General Hillary Kipkosgey
- Website: ksa.go.ke

The Kenya Space Agency (KSA) is a state corporation mandated to promote, coordinate and regulate space-related activities in the country. It was established in 2017 as the successor to the National Space Secretariat (NSS).

== History ==
In 1964, Kenya and Italy collaborated to establish a satellite launching and tracking base in Malindi, the Broglio Space Center. From 1967 to 1989 over 20 sounding rockets and 9 rockets were launched from the Broglio Space Center. The facility is currently jointly managed and operated through a collaborative and enduring partnership with the Italian Space Agency, also known as Agenzia Spaziale Italiana (ASI). The Malindi Space Centre currently provides Tracking, Telemetry and Command (TT&C) Services to a number of customers, including NASA, SpaceX, European Space Agency and CNES, among others.

Besides TT&C services, the Malindi Space Centre, through support from the Italian Space Agency, is also establishing a Centre for Earth Observation and Remote Sensing.

Until 2009 Kenya did not have a space programme of its own. That changed with the formal installation of the National Space Secretariat (NSS) under the wing of the Ministry for Defence. The NSS facilitated the development of the Kenya Space Policy 2016, Kenya Space Strategy 2016 and the Kenya Space Agency Order 2017.

The Kenya Space Agency (KSA) was established through Legal Notice No. 22 of 7 March 2017 with the mandate to promote, coordinate and regulate all Space-related activities in the country. The headquarters of the Agency is in Nairobi. The inaugural Board of Directors of the Agency was inaugurated by the Cabinet Secretary, Defence on 11 September 2018. The Executive Order No. 1 of 2023 placed the Agency under the Ministry of Defence (MoD).

== Satellites launched ==
While there have been many launches by the Italian Space Agency using the Broglio Space Center until 1989, KSA launched its own satellites much later.

=== 1KUNS-PF ===
The 1KUNS-PF is a CubeSat and was the first Kenyan-owned satellite to be launched into space in 2018.

The 1KUNS-PF was an experimental cubesat, with the main mission being to create awareness to the locals on the benefits of space uses. On board the cubesat, there were camera payloads, which were used to take mapping images of Kenya and other East Africa countries within the vicinity of its orbit. The cubesat was designed to have a lifespan of one year and its operations were within the UN space use mitigation measures. 1KUNS-PF deorbited in June 2020.

=== TAIFA-1 ===
The TAIFA-1 satellite is an earth observation 3U CubeSat, and was launched on 14 April 2023 together with Exolaunch aboard SpaceX's Falcon 9. It is the first satellite launched by KSA that was purely developed by Kenyan engineers with training provided by EnduroSat.

The word "taifa" is Swahili meaning "one nation".

== Research grants ==
The Kenya Space Agency offers research grants to promote advancements in Space Science and Technology within local universities. Recent initiatives include grants for projects such as Small-Scale Crop Mapping using AI/ML and Nanosatellite Development, with funding such as Ksh 2.5 million (approximately USD 22,292) designated for these projects.

The Research Grant programme aims to catalyse and promote research in Space Science and Technology at Kenya’s local universities, as well as build the technical capacity in these disciplines, which will contribute towards Kenya’s socio-economic development by building linkages between academia and the industry.

== Kenya Space Expo and Conference (KSEC) ==
The Kenya Space Expo and Conference is a biennial event organized by the Kenya Space Agency (KSA) to promote the understanding and utilization of space science, technology, and applications for socio-economic development and societal benefits.

=== History and purpose ===
The inaugural Kenya Space Expo and Conference was held from 15 to 17 June 2022 in Nairobi, Kenya, under the theme "Leveraging Space Capabilities for National Development." The event has since established itself as a significant forum for engaging stakeholders in Africa's space sector, including government representatives, policymakers, academia, industry professionals, international organizations, and the general public.

The second edition of the Kenya Space Expo and Conference was held from 18 to 20 June 2024 with the aim to further enhance awareness of the utility of space opportunities through the showcasing of successful use cases and innovations. Under the theme "Space Technologies for Societal Benefits," it underscored the potential of space technologies to address socio-economic challenges, support sustainable development, and drive national progress.
