= Gussalli =

Gussalli may refer to:

- Luigi Gussalli (1885-1950), Italian engineer and astronomer
- 32944 Gussalli, a main-belt asteroid
