= Taifa-1 =

Kenyan owned satellite

The Taifa-1 satellite also capitalized as TAIFA-1 satellite, is a Kenyan earth observation 3U CubeSat, and was launched on 14 April 2023 into space together in a joint collaboration with Exolaunch aboard a SpaceX's Falcon 9 rocket from Vandenberg Space Force Base in California, USA. It is the first satellite launched by Kenya Space Agency that was purely developed by Kenyan engineers with an intensive training provided by EnduroSat. Although the satellite was developed and designed by Kenyan engineers, the manufacturing was solely done by EnduroSat.

It was dubbed as the first Kenyan 3U software-defined NanoSat. The satellite was launched with the weight of expectations surrounding around the need of elevating the space economy of Kenya to global standards. It took approximately a span of two years to prepare the satellite and about 50 million Kenyan shilling was spent for the project while the satellite was given insurance by Marsh Limited.

== Background ==
SayariLabs and EnduroSat reportedly signed a commercial agreement to launch the TAIFA-1 satellite.

== Launch and purpose ==
TAIFA-1 became the first operational satellite to be launched by Kenya. The satellite took off from California, USA, according to images from the US space company as it reached orbit on 14 April 2023.

The Kenyan Ministry of Defence and the Kenya Space Agency (KSA) together in a joint statement indicated the moment as "an important milestone" that should be able to boost Kenya's "budding space economy". The satellite was supposed to be part of Kenya's ambitious efforts to boost and foster space economy.

== Legacy ==
The word "taifa" is derived from the Swahili-language and it implies a meaning of "one nation".
