= Buongiorno =

Buongiorno ("good morning") may refer to:

== People ==
- Alessandro Buongiorno (born 1999), Italian footballer
- Carlo Buongiorno, Italian aerospace engineer (1930–2011)
- Donatus Buongiorno (1865–1935), Italian-American painter

== Other ==
- Buongiorno (company), Italian company
- Buongiorno papà, 2013 Italian film
- Buongiorno, notte, 2003 Italian film
- Buongiorno, elefante!, 1952 Italian film
- Buongiorno Italia, Italian morning show
