= Gaetano Crocco =

Italian scientist and aeronautics pioneer (1877–1968)

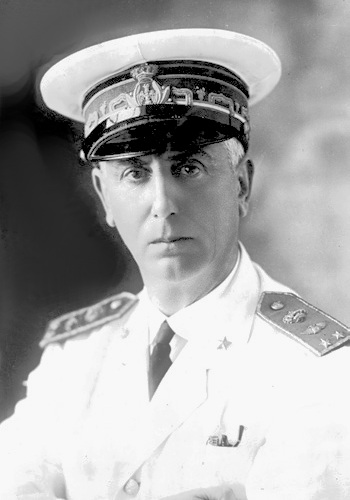
Gaetano Crocco on an unknown date

Gaetano Arturo Crocco (26 October 1877 – 19 January 1968) was an Italian scientist and aeronautics pioneer, the founder of the Italian Rocket Society, and went on to become Italy's leading space scientist. He was born in Naples.

In 1927, Crocco began working with solid-propellant rockets and, in 1929, designed and built the first liquid-propellant rocket motors in Italy. He began work with monopropellants (fuel and oxidizer combined in one chemical liquid) in 1932, making him one of the first researchers in this field.

As head of the School of Aeronautics of the University of Rome, he performed research on flight mechanics, structural design, and high-altitude flight in addition to his work in rocket propulsion.

Because of his early efforts in aeronautics, Italian satellites were launched starting in the 1960s. The San Marco programme was a cooperative effort of NASA and the Italian Space Commission, with NASA providing launch vehicles, use of its facilities, and training of Italian personnel.

== Aeronautical space activities ==
G.A. Crocco was a pioneer in aeronautics and astronautics. In 1898 he was serving in the Italian Army Engineers Corps in the Wireless Dept. when he met Captain Maurizio Moris. Moris, heading a Specialists Brigade, was deeply interested in the new field of aeronautics: he took Crocco in his staff starting a lifelong cooperation. At the time the Specialists Brigade was testing anchored balloons on Lake Bracciano north of Rome. In 1904 Crocco started experimenting with airships. In 1906, together with Ottavio Ricaldoni he developed Airship 1 featuring a revolutionary semi-rigid flexible structure. On 31 October 1908, piloting an improved version of the airship, the N1, with a rudder and direction indicators, Crocco flew from Vigna di Valle to Rome and back, covering 50 miles in one hour and a half. N1 was the first airship ever to fly over Rome at an altitude of 500 mt (1500 ft). In 1912 Crocco and Rinaldoni tested a hydroplane on the Bracciano lake while experimenting with airships together with other researchers (one of them, Umberto Nobile, would become eventually a famous polar explorer). In the meantime Crocco kept studying propellers' shapes and sections and in 1914 drew plans for a closed-circuit wind tunnel to be built in Rome.

In 1923 Crocco started studying space flight, jet propulsion and rocket fuels. In 1927 the Aeronautic Experimental Institute where Crocco was working, obtained a 200,000 ItL financing (equivalent to today's 1 million Euro) to develop black powder rocket motors to be tested later in a BPD firing range at Segni, east of Rome. He moved on to research on liquid fuels, drawing plans for the first Italian-built combustion chamber, tested in 1930 with the help of his son, Luigi Crocco. The outbreak of World War II and lack of financing confined Crocco to academic activities: he directed the Aeronautic Engineering School from 1935 to 1942 and then again from 1948 to 1952, when Luigi Broglio succeeded him in the post. In those years Crocco wrote hundreds of papers and patented so many inventions that his students used to say in mock poetry "Everything I use or see, Oh my Crocco is made by thee."

After WW II Crocco went back to his old passions, missiles and astronautics, creating in 1950 an informative course on superior ballistics within the Aeronautic Engineering School. In the inaugural speech he spoke extensively on man-made satellites and rocket trajectories. In 1951 he founded the Italian Rocket Association (AIR) to rally all the fans of the new astronautic science. In 1951, a full decade before the Gagarin space flight, he held a meeting on the problems of a crewed spaceship re-entry in the atmosphere. Later on he devised a parallel-stage rocket, a method more rarely applied than tandem stages.

Crocco was inducted as a member of the inaugural class to the International Space Hall of Fame.

He can be considered the first to calculate a mission trajectory considering multiple gravity-assists.

== The 'Crocco Mission' or 'Crocco Grand Tour' ==
In 1956 Crocco, nearly 80 years old, produced what is considered his most important contribution to astronautics: in his "One-Year Exploration-Trip Earth-Mars-Venus-Earth" paper presented at the Seventh Congress of the International Astronautical Federation IAF, Rome, in 1956, he suggested exploiting the Mars and Venus gravitational fields as propelling forces to cut dramatically the travelling time of a space capsule. This 'gravitational slingshot' or 'gravity assist' or 'swing-by' method was such that the NASA recommended the study of his theories and especially his swing-by maneuvers contracting firms working on interplanetary flight and its perspectives.

Basing his calculations on Hohmann's orbit, the sci-fi writer Arthur C. Clarke had stated once that an Earth to Mars flight with a minimum fuel consumption would require at least 259 days. Then another 425 days should elapse on the Red Planet to re-align the planets so as to travel back again in 259 days. Crocco deemed this period too long and drew his own calculations exploiting Mars gravity pull to fly over the planet without landing. Mars gravity would deflect the spaceship's trajectory towards the Earth cutting the flight's overall length to less than a year, the only objection being the poor quality of data gathered passing over Mars at an altitude of more than a million miles. But, Crocco added, should the spaceship be re-directed towards Venus and not the Earth, it would fly over Mars at a much closer range: observation by the astronauts would be much more satisfactory, and moreover they could observe Venus as well, still keeping the trip's time under a year. He calculated 113 days from Earth to Mars, 154 to reach Venus from Mars and 98 days from Venus back to Earth and affirmed that the first occasion for this 'Crocco Grand Tour' would be occurring in 1971. Such missions have not been attempted but many interplanetary space probes have used similar gravity assist manoeuvres.

== Awards and honors ==
The crater Crocco on the Moon is named after him.

== Bibliography ==
- Museo di Vigna di Valle
- Gaetano Arturo Crocco, Giro esplorativo di un anno Terra-Marte-Venere-Terra, Rendiconti del VII Congresso Internazionale Astronautico, Roma, settembre 1956, pagg. 201-225; traduzione inglese: "One-Year Exploration-Trip Earth-Mars-Venus-Earth," Gaetano A. Crocco, c, Rendiconti pp. 227–252.
- Filippo Graziani, La Scuola di Ingegneria Aerospaziale nell'ottantesimo anniversario della sua fondazione

== See also ==
- Crocco's Multiplanetary Trajectory
