= Crocco's Multiplanetary Trajectory =

Earth-Mars-Venus-Earth route

Crocco's Multiplanetary Trajectory, sometimes named Crocco's Mission and Crocco's "Grand Tour", is a mathematical description of an hypothetical Earth-Mars-Venus-Earth-Research Mission, which was first proposed in 1956 by the Aeronautics and Space Pioneer G. A. Crocco during the VII. International Astronautical Congress in Rome.

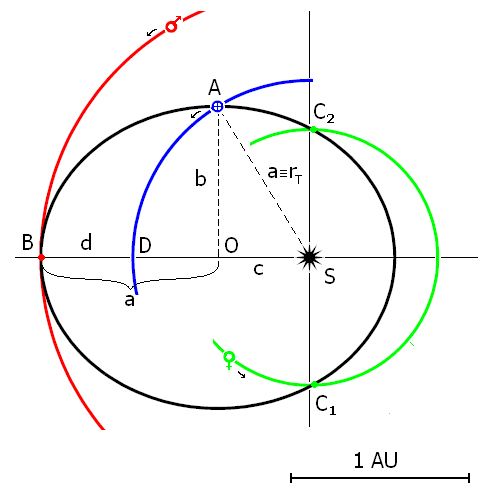
A simplified Depiction of Crocco's Multiplanetary Trajectory. The black Ellipse depicts the trajectory, while the blue, red and green curves represent the Orbits of Earth, Mars and Venus respectively. The positions of the planets are marked on the date of Departure from Earth and at the date the spacecraft passes at the shortest distance to the respective planet.

== History ==
With the beginning of spaceflight in the first half of the 20th century, theoretical mathematicians estimated the amount of energy required for interplanetary spaceflight for the first time, the energy requirement being significantly higher than that of any chemical fuel available at that time. It remained questionable if humanity would ever be capable of reaching certain locations in the Solar System.

Even though Walter Hohmann had already calculated the most energy-efficient trajectory between two similar circular orbits (the Hohmann transfer orbit) at the beginning of the century, an Earth-Mars-Earth round trip utilizing this flight path would have made it a necessity to remain on the surface of Mars for a duration of 425 days, waiting for the planets to align and the next launch window to open, in addition to 259 days for both the journey to Mars and the return to Earth.

For this reason, Gaetano Crocco developed the concept of a Nonstop-Round-Trip to Mars, which would have had a far lower energy requirement, as the rocket engines of the craft would only have to accelerate it in a single maneuver to attain the necessary velocity to reach Mars. During the passing of the spacecraft, onboard crew would have performed analysis of the martian surface. Even this trajectory would have amounted to a flight time of a little over one year, if the spacecraft were not accelerated in another orbital maneuver.

== Properties ==
Crocco searched for an orbit with the following properties:

- Crosses the orbit of the Earth
- Crosses the orbit of Mars
- Orbital period of one year

With proper selection of a certain launch window, this would also have allowed the spacecraft to return one year after departure. By applying slight modifications to the trajectory it would have been possible to pass by Venus in the same mission as well.

Crocco realized that the flight trajectory may be disrupted by the gravitational fields of Mars and Venus, delaying or ultimately preventing return to Earth. He solved this problem by directing the flight path through the gravitational fields of Venus and Mars in such a way that their attraction would cancel each other out. The Mission Profile presented in 1956 consisted of a 154-day travel from Earth to Mars, followed by a 113-day travel to Venus including passing by the planet and using the gravitational attraction for a course correction, followed by the 98-day return to Earth. Crocco proposed the first Mission to be launched in June 1971.

== Difference between Crocco's mission and gravity assists ==
Crocco was well aware of the planet's gravitational effects, but his mission profile is neither using them to accelerate nor decelerate, instead limiting itself to utilizing them for trajectory stabilizations. Still, it is mistakenly widely assumed that G. A. Crocco would have been the inventor of the gravity assist.

== Literature ==
- Michael A. Minovitch A method for determining interplanetary free-fall reconnaissance trajectories Jet Propulsion Laboratory, 23. August 1961 ( Archived 20 März 2019)
- Gaetano A. Crocco One-Year Exploration-Trip Earth-Mars-Venus-Earth 7th Congress of the International Astronautical Federation, Rome, September 1956 ( Archived 15 March 2016)
- Richard L. Dowling, Kosmann, William J.; Minovitch, Michael A.; Ridenoure, Rex W: The origin of gravity-propelled interplanetary space travel 41st Congress of the International Astronautical Federation, Dresden, 6-12 Oktober 1990
  ( Archived 17 April 2021)
