= Tuscia =

Historical region of Italy

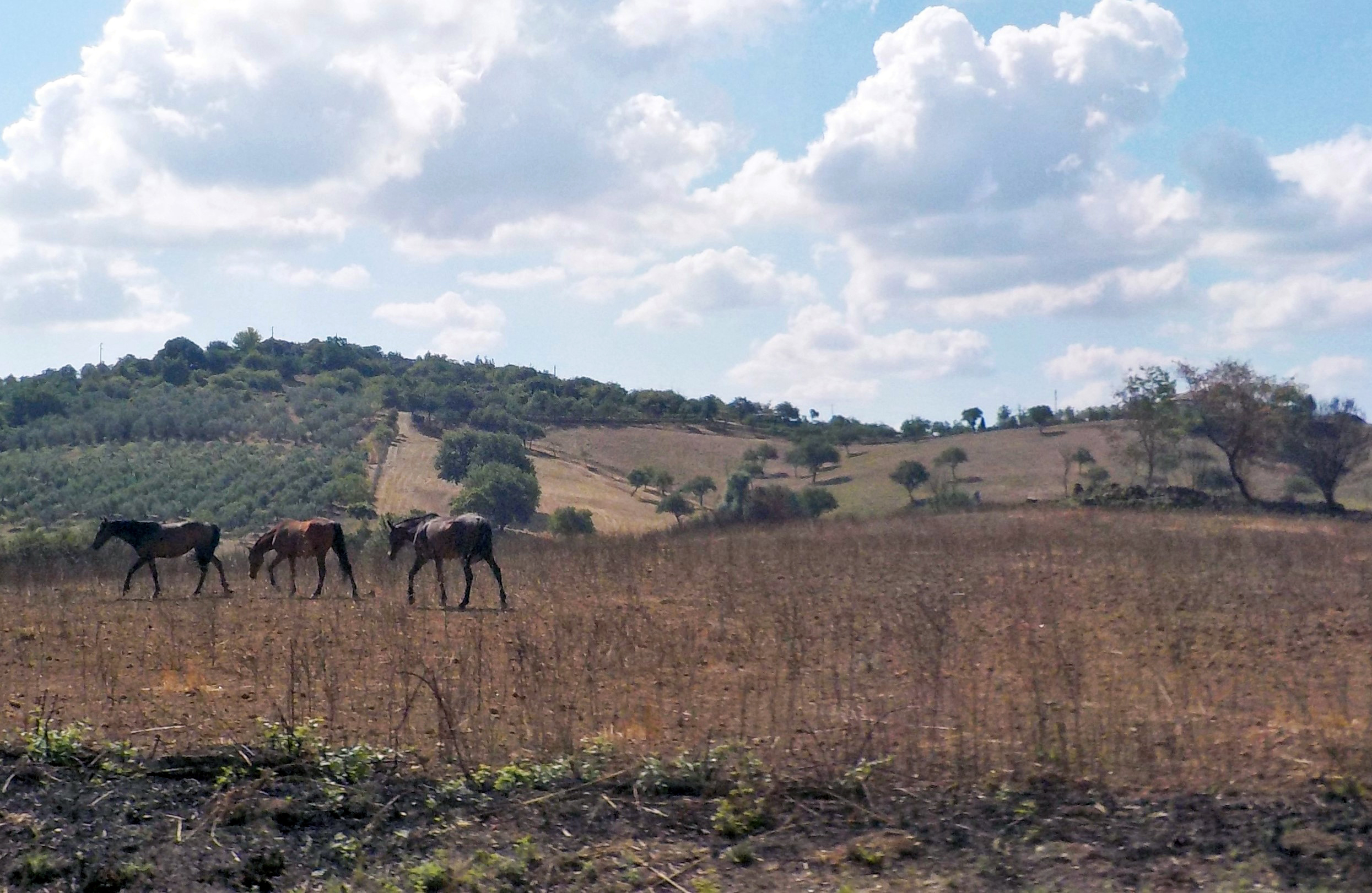
The countryside of Tuscia in 2017

Tuscia (/ˈtʌsiə, ˈtʌʃ(i)ə/ TUSS-ee-ə, TUSH-(ee-)ə, Italian: [ˈtuʃʃa]) is a historical region of central Italy that comprises part of the territories under Etruscan influence, or Etruria, named so since the Roman conquest.

From the Middle Ages, the name was used to refer to three macro-areas: the "Roman Tuscia", corresponding to northern Lazio with the ancient Papal province of the Patrimony of St. Peter, which today is equivalent to the province of Viterbo and the northern part of the metropolitan city of Rome north up to Lake Bracciano; the "Ducal Tuscia", which included the territories of Lazio and Umbria subject to the Duchy of Spoleto, which was later also incorporated into the papal territories; and the "Lombard Tuscia", roughly the current Tuscany, including the territories subjected to the Lombards and constituting the Duchy of Tuscia. The latter region is nowadays no longer referred to as Tuscia, which term is often used as a synonym for the province of Viterbo.

== Villages ==
- Civitella d'Agliano
- Castel Cellesi
- Vejano
