= List of Italian astronauts =

The following is a list of Italian astronauts who have traveled into space, sorted by date of first flight.

As of 2024, twelve Italians have been in space. Eight of those have made orbital flights, and five have made suborbital flights, Walter Villadei being the only Italian to make both. The first Italian in space was Franco Malerba in 1992. Roberto Vittori and Paolo Nespoli have both made three orbital spaceflights in their careers, which is the current record for Italian astronauts.

== Orbital ==
Image	Name	Mission	Mission start	Mission duration	Space station	Mission objectives	Ref.
	Franco Malerba	STS-46	July 31, 1992	7 days		Deployed ESA's European Retrievable Carrier satellite	
	Maurizio Cheli	STS-75	February 22, 1996	15 days		Deployed the Italian Tethered Satellite System	
	Umberto Guidoni	STS-75	February 22, 1996	15 days		Deployed the Italian Tethered Satellite System	
	Umberto Guidoni	STS-100	April 19, 2001	11 days	ISS	Delivered Canadarm2 to the ISS	
	Roberto Vittori	Soyuz TM-34 / Soyuz TM-33	April 25, 2002	10 days	ISS		
	Roberto Vittori	Soyuz TMA-6 / Soyuz TMA-5	April 15, 2005	10 days	ISS		
	Roberto Vittori	STS-134	May 16, 2011	15 days	ISS	Delivered the Alpha Magnetic Spectrometer and an ExPRESS Logistics Carrier to the International Space Station.	
	Paolo Nespoli	STS-120	October 23, 2007	15 days	ISS	ISS assembly	
	Paolo Nespoli	Soyuz TMA-20 / Expedition 26 / Expedition 27	December 15, 2010	159 days	ISS		
	Paolo Nespoli	Soyuz MS-05 / Expedition 52 / Expedition 53	July 28, 2017	139 days	ISS		
	Luca Parmitano	Soyuz TMA-09M / Expedition 36 / Expedition 37	May 28, 2013	166 days	ISS		
	Luca Parmitano	Soyuz MS-13 / Expedition 60 / Expedition 61	July 20, 2019	200 days	ISS		
	Samantha Cristoforetti	Soyuz TMA-15M / Expedition 42 / Expedition 43	November 23, 2014	200 days	ISS	Prepared a berthing slip prepared at the forward end of the Harmony connecting node	
	Samantha Cristoforetti	SpaceX Crew-4 / Expedition 67 / Expedition 68	April 27, 2022	170 days	ISS		
	Walter Villadei	Axiom Mission 3	January 18, 2024	21 days, 15 hours, 41 minutes	ISS		

== Suborbital ==
Image	Name	Mission	Flight date	Comments	Ref.
	Pantaleone Carlucci	Galactic 01	June 29, 2023	Reached an apogee of 85.1 km	
	Angelo Landolfi	Galactic 01	June 29, 2023	Reached an apogee of 85.1 km	
	Nicola Pecile	Galactic 01	June 29, 2023	Reached an apogee of 85.1 km	
	Nicola Pecile	Galactic 03	September 8, 2023	Reached an apogee of 88.56 km	
	Nicola Pecile	Galactic 06	January 26, 2024	Reached an apogee of 88.8 km	
	Nicola Pecile	Galactic 07	June 8, 2024	Reached an apogee of 87.5 km	
	Walter Villadei	Galactic 01	June 29, 2023	Reached an apogee of 85.1 km	
	Ketty Maisonrouge	Galactic 05	November 2, 2023	Reached an apogee of 87.2 km	
	Giorgio Manenti	Galactic 07	June 8, 2024	Reached an apogee of 87.5 km	

== See also ==
- Italian Space Agency
