= Explorer 45 =

NASA satellite of the Explorer program

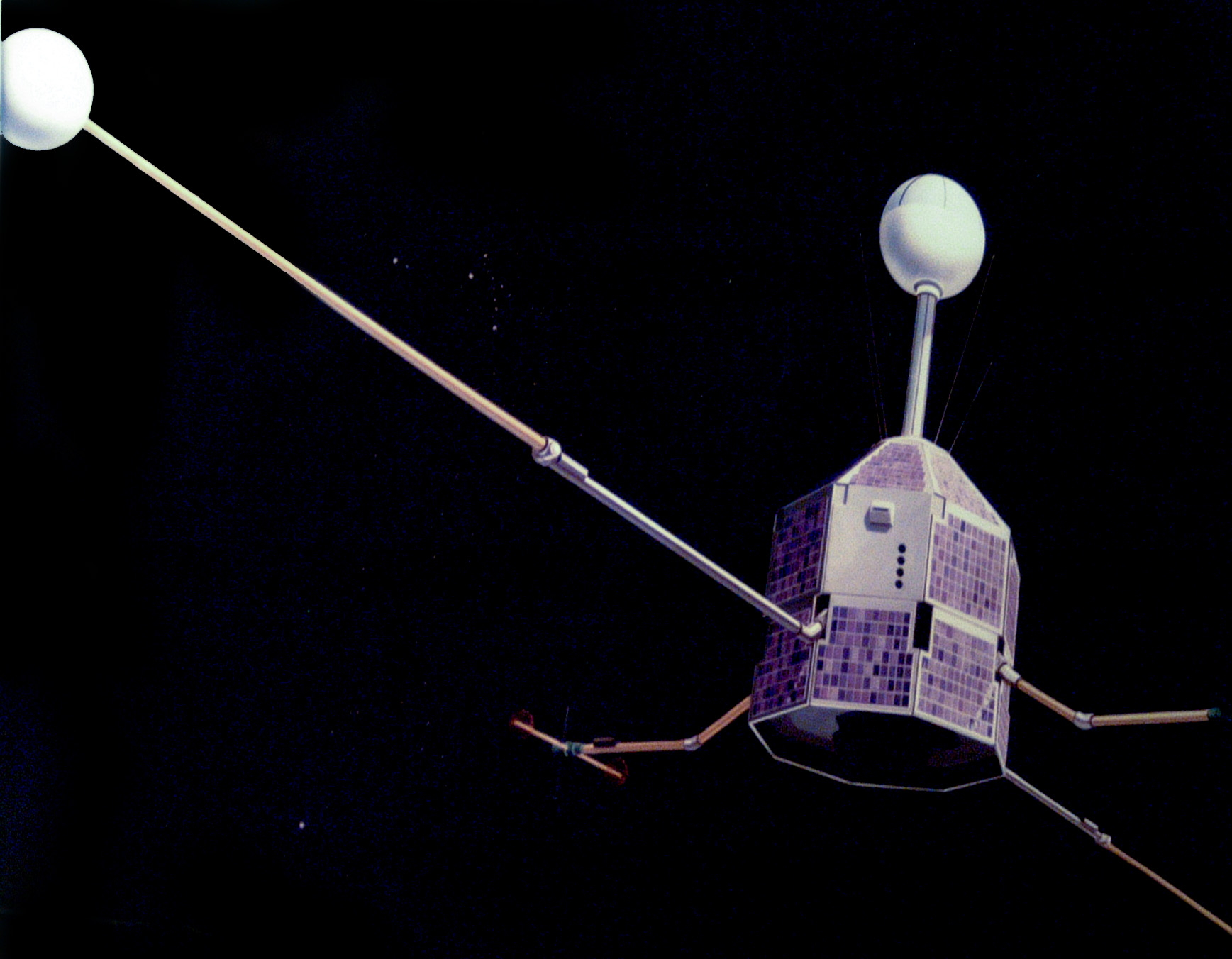
- Explorer 45 (SSS-A) satellite
- Names: SSS-A; S-Cubed A Small Scientific Satellite-A
- Mission type: Space physics
- Operator: NASA
- COSPAR ID: 1971-096A
- SATCAT no.: 05598
- Mission duration: 3 years (achieved)

Spacecraft properties
- Spacecraft: Explorer XLV
- Spacecraft type: Small Scientific Satellite
- Bus: SSS
- Launch mass: 52 kg (115 lb)

Start of mission
- Launch date: 15 November 1971, 05:52:00 GMT
- Rocket: Scout B (S-163CR)
- Launch site: Broglio Space Center, San Marco platform
- Contractor: Vought
- Entered service: 15 November 1971

End of mission
- Deactivated: 30 September 1974
- Last contact: 30 September 1974
- Decay date: 10 January 1992

Orbital parameters
- Reference system: Geocentric orbit
- Regime: Highly elliptical orbit
- Perigee altitude: 224 km (139 mi)
- Apogee altitude: 27,031 km (16,796 mi)
- Inclination: 3.50°
- Period: 469.30 minutes

Instruments
- AC Electric Field Measurement; Channel Electron Multipliers with Electrostatic Analyzers; DC Electric Field Measurement; Fluxgate Magnetometers; Search Coil Magnetometers; Solid-State Detectors; Solid-State Proton-Alpha Particle Telescopes

Explorer 45 (also called as SSS-A and S-Cubed A) was a NASA satellite launched as part of Explorer program. Explorer 45 was the only one to be released from the program Small Scientific Satellite.

== Scientific objectives ==
Explorer 45 was designed to perform a wide variety of investigations within the magnetosphere with regards to particle fluxes, electric fields, and magnetic fields. Its primary scientific objectives were:

- Study the characteristics and origin of the Earth's ring current and development of the main-phase magnetic storms
- Study the relation between magnetic storms, substorms, and the acceleration of charged particles within the inner magnetosphere
- Determine the major wave-particle interaction mechanisms, directional measurements of protons, electrons, and alpha particles were made over a wide energy range, and DC and AC electric and magnetic fields were measured.

== Spacecraft ==
Explorer 45 had the capability for complete inflight control of the data format through the use of an onboard set of stored program instructions. These instructions governed the collection of data and were reprogrammable via ground command. The antenna system consisted of four dipole antennas spaced 90° apart on the surface of the spacecraft cover. The satellite contained two transmitters, one for digital (PCM) data at 446 bps, and the other for either the digital data or wideband analog data from 30-Hz to 10-kHz from the ac electric field probes and from one search coil sensor. The command system handled 80 commands for controlling the spacecraft and experiment functions, as well as for flight program loads for the data processing system. The antenna system consisted of four dipole antennas spaced 90° apart on the surface of the spacecraft cover. The satellite power system consisted of a rechargeable battery and an array of solar cells. The spin rate was about 7 rpm, and the spin axis lay in the spacecraft orbital plane which was approximately the same as the Earth's equatorial plane. The initial local time of apogee was about 21.8 hours and the line of apsides moved around toward the Sun at an initial rate of 12° per month. The satellite was operationally turned off on 30 September 1974, after approximately 3 years of successful and productive operation.

== Experiments ==
=== AC Electric Field Measurement ===
The electric dipole antenna consisted of two boom-mounted graphite coated spheres, 13.97 cm (5.50 in) in diameter, with a center-to-center separation of 5.08 m (16.7 ft). Each sphere was connected to a high-input-impedance (capacitance approximately equal to 10 pF, resistance approximately equal to 50 megohms), unity-gain preamplifier mounted on the boom about halfway between the center of the sphere and the center of the spacecraft. The axis of the antenna was perpendicular to the spacecraft spin axis. The electronics for the electric field experiment consisted of a step-frequency analyzer and a wideband receiver. The spectrum analyzer had fifteen narrowband frequency channels with center frequencies logarithmically spaced from 35-Hz to 100-kHz and one wideband frequency channel with a bandpass of about 100-Hz to 10-kHz. The four highest frequency narrowband filters of the step frequency analyzer had bandwidths of ± 7.5% of their center frequencies and the remaining narrowband filters had bandwidths of ± 15.0% of their center frequencies. The filter outputs were sequentially switched into an 80-dB logarithmic detector with a measurement sensitivity of 10 microvolts/m. The wideband receiver was an automatic gain control receiver with a bandwidth from 100-Hz to 10-kHz. The output of the wideband receiver modulated a special purpose telemetry transmitter. The wideband data was recorded on the ground and then processed by a spectrum analyzer to produce high-resolution frequency-time spectrograms. The wideband system was normally operated one orbit out of three, but it could be operated continuously for special periods.

=== Channel Electron Multipliers with Electrostatic Analyzers ===
This experiment used cylindrical curved-plate electrostatic analyzers in conjunction with channel electron multipliers to study ion and electron directional intensities in 8 or 16 contiguous energy intervals in the energy range 800-eV to 25-keV. Under normal operation, the voltage steps were synchronized to either the half roll or full roll of the satellite. Dual detector systems were used to extend the dynamic range of the instrument. A complete set of measurements was obtained every 64-seconds. This period was programmable. There were two electrostatic analyzers which looked along the spin axis. Both were capable of measuring ions or electrons as selected by ground command. One measured particles at 2-keV, the other at 5-keV.

=== DC Electric Field Measurement ===
The electric field antenna consisted of two 13.97 cm (5.50 in) in diameter metal spheres mounted on the ends of two booms with a 5.08 m (16.7 ft) separation. Determination of the potential difference between the spheres yielded electric fields with a sensitivity of 0.1 mV/m. The rotation of the spacecraft allowed a two-component DC measurement to be made. Over most of the orbit the DC measurements were contaminated by spacecraft photosheath-induced potentials and should not be used for determination of DC electric fields. A calibration plate on the spacecraft was used to change the spacecraft potential, thus checking on sheath overlap errors. In addition to the DC measurement, four rms spectrometer channels and a broad-band channel sampled low-frequency variations. The rms spectrometer channels sampled low-frequency variations from 0.3 to 1, 1 to 3, 3 to 10, and 10 to 30-Hz. About 1300 orbits of data were obtained, covering magnetic local times from 08:00 to 23:00 hours through the noon sector. The instrument was used to locate the plasmapause because its amplifiers became saturated by the fields within the spacecraft photosheath when the electron density was below about 60 per cc. About 900 measurements were obtained of the plasmapause boundary throughout the useful lifetime of the instrument.

=== Fluxgate Magnetometers ===
This experiment was designed to measure the vector magnetic field and fluctuations over the spacecraft's orbit. This set of magnetometers consisted of a triaxial fluxgate system. These, along with a commandable flipper mechanism to check zero levels, were housed in the sphere at the end of the single boom extending 76 cm (30 in) along the spin axis. This system measured the vector magnetic field from DC to 10-Hz with a sensitivity of less than 5 nT. The magnetic field was sampled 30 times each second. The experiment functioned normally until the latter part of March 1973 when a switch in the spacecraft analog multiplexer began to fail. No useful data were obtained after that time.

=== Search Coil Magnetometers ===
This experiment consisted of two perpendicular search coil magnetometers, each mounted on a 61 cm (24 in) radial boom. The plane of one magnetometer was perpendicular to the spacecraft spin axis, and the plane of the other was parallel to the spacecraft spin axis. This system measured magnetic fluctuations between 1 and 3000-Hz. The search coil outputs were routed to sets of filters, each of which was nominally sampled once each second. The experiment functioned normally until the latter part of March 1973 when a switch in the spacecraft analog multiplexer (which affects analog to digital conversion) began to fail. After that time, the only reliable data were analog broad-band data.

=== Solid-State Detectors ===
The solid-state electron detector was a magnetic spectrometer with an 800 g (28 oz) magnet, and four 300-micrometer, 0.25-cm^{2}, rectangular, surface barrier, solid-state detectors. Electron intensities were measured in the energy ranges 35 to 70 keV, 75 to 125 keV, 120 to 240 keV, and 240 to 560 keV. After March 1973, due to a failure in the spacecraft analog multiplexer, analog data were not available and the actual energy levels could not be determined without special effort.

=== Solid-State Proton-Alpha Particle Telescopes ===
This experiment contained two telescopes, each consisting of two surface barrier solid-state silicon detector elements. The low-energy range telescope had detectors of thicknesses 100 and 300 micrometers, and was mounted behind a 2.2 kg (4.9 lb) broom magnet to sweep out electrons with energies less than 300-keV. This telescope measured the flux of protons in six channels covering the energy range 24.3 to 300-keV. The heavy ion telescope had detectors of thicknesses 3.4 and 100 micrometres. This telescope uniquely identified the presence of protons, alpha particles (Z=2), and two groups of heavier ions, (lithium, beryllium, boron) and (carbon, nitrogen, oxygen), plus ions with Z>=9. The heavy ion telescope measured proton fluxes in six channels covering the energy range 365 to 872-keV, and the fluxes of alpha particles in the energy ranges 1.16 to 1.74-keV and 1.74 to 3.15-keV. It measured the fluxes of lithium, berrelyum, and boron ions in the ranges 3.6 to 7.1-MeV, 6.1 to 9.7-MeV, and 8.7 to 12.2-MeV, respectively, and the fluxes of C, N, and O ions in the ranges 12.1 to 15.7-MeV, 15.6 to 19.2-MeV, and 19.1 to 22.7-MeV, respectively. And it measured the flux of Z>=9 ions with energies > 20-MeV. In addition, electrons of energy greater than 300-keV were detected via the coincidence mode of the low-energy range telescope. Both telescopes were mounted at 90° to the satellite spin axis, and had full conical viewing angles of about 11°.

== Launch ==
Explorer 45 as launched on 15 November 1971, at 05:52:00 GMT, from the San Marco platform of the Broglio Space Center, Kenya, with a Scout B launch vehicle.

== Atmospheric entry ==
Explorer 45 reentered in the atmosphere on 10 January 1992.

== See also ==
- Explorer program
