= Luigi Broglio =

Architect of Italy's satellite launch programme

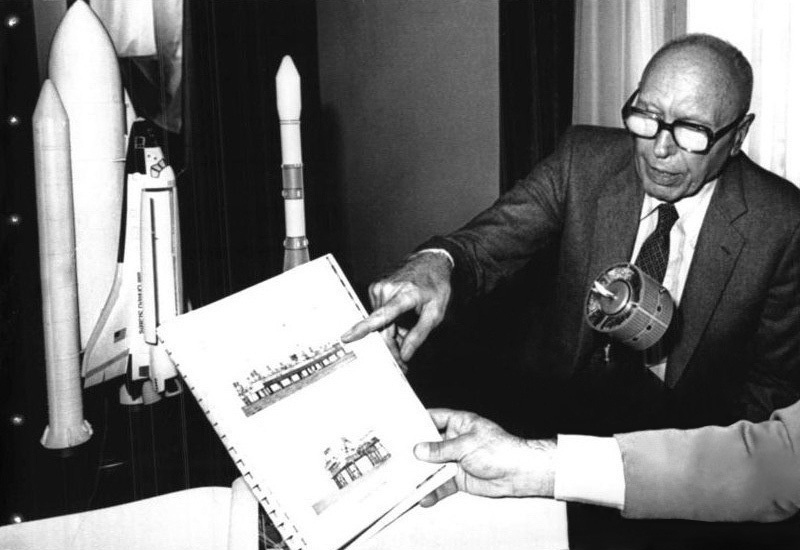

Luigi Broglio (11 November 1911 – 14 January 2001), was an Italian aerospace engineer, airforce lieutenant colonel and dean of the school of aeronautical engineering at the University of Rome La Sapienza. Known as "the Italian von Braun", he is best known as the architect of the San Marco programme.

The facility he conceived, originally the San Marco Equatorial Range, is now named in his honour as well as the asteroid 18542 Broglio.

== Life ==
=== Early years ===
Born in Mestre, near Venice in 1911, Broglio moved to Rome with family in 1915. Graduating in civil engineering in 1934, he began 3 years of military service as an artillery officer in the army. After his service Broglio applied to the Italian Airforce (Aeronautica Militare Italiana, AMI) becoming First Lieutenant where, using his engineering experience, he was assigned to work at the AMI research centre at Guidonia Montecelio. He would work here on a variety of aerospace projects including jet engines until the Armistice in Italy during World War II in September 1943 when Broglio fled from occupying German forces and joined a partisan group.

After the war he became dean of La Sapienza's school of aeronautical engineering in 1952, the successor to the rocket pioneer Gaetano Arturo Crocco. At the school he formed the Centro Ricerche Aerospaziali (CRA), establishing a supersonic wind tunnel. In 1956 he was assigned leadership of air-force's ammunition research unit Direzione Generali Armi e Munitioni (DGAM), responsible for the military’s rocket programme, by General Secretary of Aeronautics Mario Pezzi. The unit ran the Salto di Quirra rocket test range on Sardinia and Broglio would be involved in weather experiments using American Nike-Cajun rockets to release sodium clouds for study.

=== San Marco programme ===
With the launch of Sputnik 1 in 1957, there was a desire from many countries to pursue their own satellite research programmes. In Italy, the influential physicist Edoardo Amaldi in particular would press for the creation of an indigenous programme. Amaldi convinced Broglio to support the idea and both would eventually help form the Italian Space Research Commission, a branch of the National Research Council with the aim of gathering support for an Italian space endeavour. With Broglio as president of the commission, they were successful in lobbying the Italian government to support his proposal for a national programme to set up an offshore equatorial launch base with the support of NASA rockets and crew training. The programme would lead to the launch of the first Italian-built satellite, San Marco 1. San Marco 1 was not launched from the platform.

=== Later life ===
In the years after, Broglio continued to pursue his career in the Italian Air Force as well as his academic work at La Sapienza and, since its formation in 1988, also as a director of the Italian Space Agency (ASI). When the decision was made in 1993 to downgrade the center in Kenya to a satellite ground station, Broglio withdrew from ASI's board of directors and went into retirement.

== See also ==
- Italian Air Force
- Broglio Space Centre - modern name of the San Marco Equatorial Range
- Italian Space Agency

== Bibliography ==
- Di Bernardo Nicolai, Giorgio. Nella nebbia, in attesa del Sole. Breve storia di Luigi Broglio, padre dell'astronautica italiana (2005)
