= Shotput (rocket) =

American sounding rocket

- The launch of Shotput 6 on April 20, 1963
- Function: Sounding rocket
- Country of origin: United States

Launch history
- Status: Retired
- Launch sites: Wallops Flight Facility
- Total launches: 7
- Success(es): 5
- First flight: October 27, 1959
- Last flight: August 2, 1963

The Shotput, known officially as the Sergeant-Delta, was a two-stage solid fueled sounding rocket developed by NASA to test Project Echo and the third stage of the Thor-Delta on sub-orbital flights from 1959 to 1962. Additional Shotputs would later be used to test equipment for the San Marco satellites in 1963.

== Development ==
Project Echo was an effort at NASA to develop passive communications satellites to act as large geostationary microwave deflectors for Earth ground stations. Project Echo began work as a NACA project in 1956, and predated even the conception of Sputnik. The program centered around launching, and then inflating, thin 100 ft diameter mylar balloons in orbit. In order to refine the process of deployment, and prove the feasibility of the concept of actually inflating a balloon in the vacuum of space, NASA determined that suborbital test flights would be needed for iterative testing. Within Project Echo, the development of these suborbital flights and its launch vehicle was called "Project Shotput" and was led by Norman L. Crabill, the lead rocket engineer at Wallops Flight Facility. Shotput would be the first rocket designed by the Langley Research Center to launch and was intended to deploy Echo "at simulated orbital insertion." The deflated Echo balloon would be stored in a metal sphere before deployment, resembling a shotput.

Shotput 1 would launch at 5:40pm on October 27, 1959, and although the rocket performed flawlessly, deploying the Echo following second stage burnout 60 miles over the Atlantic Ocean, the Echo had exploded some time before 3am, leaving a wide field of burning Mylar that was visible from New England to the Carolinas described by onlookers as "distant fireworks" and sparking a panic. Crabill ordered that the Echo not have its contents vacuumed out ahead of launch, deliberately leaving residual air in the balloon to help it expand, only the balloon expanded too rapidly and burst. NASA chose to keep this a secret and instead reported that Shotput 1 had been a total success. A group of NASA spokesmen would finally tell the media that the payload had exploded weeks after the launch. In order to prevent further panics NASA also initiated their policy of launch announcements, so the public knows where and when they will launch a rocket.

Shotput 2 launched on January 16, 1960. This time the "yo-yo" de-spin system failed and the payload failed to separate from the 250rpm second stage resulting in an immediate tear when the balloon tried to inflate. Shotput 3 launched on February 27, 1960. Shotput successfully deployed the payload, only the balloon tore and developed a hole, but was still able to reflect a voice transmission between Bell Labs in Holmdel, New Jersey, to Lincoln Labs in Round Hill, Massachusetts. Shotput 4 launched on April 1, 1960, and was the first to be a complete success. Following Shotput 4's success Echo would move on to orbital tests on a Thor-Delta rocket using the Shotput's deployment "yo-yo" on its third stage. After Echo's first orbital launch ended in failure Shotput 5 launched on May 13, 1961, however, the second stage Delta refused to fire with its manufacturer Douglas blaming the malfunction on a faulty accelerometer.

== Rocket ==
NASA, which had been formed in 1958, was still in its infancy, and as such had rather loose access to various military ballistic missiles with many early rockets being a smaller missile "strapped" to the top of a larger missile. This included the Sergeant rocket family which where built off the Sergeant XM-33. The Sergeant-Delta had a Sergeant as its first stage with two side-attached Recruits and a Delta X-248 upper stage. This was to test the X-248 ahead of its use as the third stage on the Thor-Delta as the second stage would deploy Shotput's payloads as if it reached orbit. Central to the second stage was a weighted mechanism known as the "yo-yo" which de-spun the rocket ahead of satellite deployment as the X-248 was spin stabilized. For the San Marco launches the X-248 was replaced with a Pollux upper stage.

== San Marco use ==
Three new Sergeant-Delta rockets where built for the joint Italian-U.S. San Marco programme. On April 20, 1963, Shotput 6, the first San Marco Sergeant-Delta, launched from Wallops carrying a 180 lb instrument payload to an altitude of 265 miles to obtain baseline high-altitude measurements for atmospheric and ionospheric characteristics. Shotput 7 would launch on August 2, 1963, placing 177.5 lbs at an altitude of 155 miles also testing scientific equipment. Shotput 8 would be disassembled and readied for shipping to Italy's Broglio Space Center off the coast of Kenya to verify it for future sounding rocket use, however, after a monsoon, it would be replaced with a Nike-Apache sounding rocket due to availability and preexisting launch hardware with the Shotput being mothballed and scrapped.

== Launches ==
| Mission | Date | Outcome | Note |
|---|---|---|---|
| Shotput 1 | October 27, 1959 | Partial Success | Shotput successfully launched, payload failed |
| Shotput 2 | January 16, 1960 | Failure | Despin device failed, payload did not separate |
| Shotput 3 | February 27, 1960 | Partial Success | Shotput successfully launched, payload failed |
| Shotput 4 | April 1, 1960 | Success | Successfully deployed payload |
| Shotput 5 | May 13, 1961 | Failure | 2nd stage failed to ignite |
| Shotput 6 | April 21, 1963 | Success | Successfully deployed payload |
| Shotput 7 | August 2, 1963 | Success | Successfully deployed payload |

== Gallary ==
Shotput 6 ready for launch

Shotput diagram
