= Norman L. Crabill =

NASA engineer (1926–2024)

- Born: October 28, 1926; District of Columbia, U.S.
- Died: May 14, 2024 (aged 97)
- Education: CUA, BAE. 1949; UVA, M.Aero.E.. 1957.
- Occupation: NASA engineer

Norman L. Crabill (October 28, 1926 – May 14, 2024) was an American NASA engineer. An employee of NASA since its creation in 1958, Crabill was originally employed by its predecessor National Advisory Committee for Aeronautics, or NACA. Over the course of his nearly 40-year career, he was recognized for numerous achievements. Crabill has written 43 publications. He was inducted into the Virginia Aviation Hall of Fame in 2003.

== Education and career ==
Crabill earned a Bachelor of Aeronautical Engineering Degree from The Catholic University of America in 1949 and a Master of Aeronautical Engineering Degree from the University of Virginia in 1957. He started his professional career with NACA in 1949 at Langley Memorial Aeronautical Laboratory working in the Pilotless Aircraft Research Division, or PARD, for the National Advisory Committee for Aeronautics, or NACA. He continued to work at the Langley Research Center when NACA became the National Aeronautics and Space Administration. He retired from NASA in 1986.

== Accomplishments ==
Crabill had a distinguished and accomplished career as a lead engineer at NASA. He performed supersonic and transonic flight tests of aircraft configurations, and the preorbital flight tests of ECHO I and II satellites using the Shotput rocket. NASA Langley developed the world’s first communication satellite, a 100-foot inflatable balloon called Echo. Acting as a passive reflector, In 1960, Echo relayed signals around of the earth, providing the first instantaneous worldwide communications. During the early Apollo landings Lunar Orbiter Program, Crabill was head of mission integration, responsible for the overall mission design. He also selected the original sites to be photographed on the Moon. After the Lunar Orbiter program, the Viking Project made history when it became the first U.S. mission to land a spacecraft safely on the surface of Mars and return images of the surface, with Crabill serving as the Mission Analysis and Design Manager. After Viking, Crabill initiated a project to use airliner flight recorder magnetic tapes to derive statistical measurements. Crabill also developed and managed the Langley Storm Hazards Program. In this program, he researched the effects of heavy precipitation, wind shear, turbulence, and lightning on aircraft, and devised standards for the prediction, detection, operating procedures, and design criteria in response to these weather incidents.

== Patents ==
Crabill holds patents for a rocket vehicle control system and an automated weather system for pilots.

== Death ==
Crabill died on May 14, 2024, at the age of 97.

== Awards and honors ==
In 2001, Crabill was honored with the Virginia Aeronautical Historical Society Judge Spain Leadership Award, and in 2008 he was inducted into Virginia Aeronautical Historical Society's Hall of Fame. In 2003, he was inducted into the Virginia Aviation Hall of Fame in 2003.

As chairman of the historical marker committee of the Virginia Aeronautical Historical Society, Crabill's historical research led to the recognition of Langley Field as Virginia's oldest continuously operating airfield, and was responsible for it gaining statewide acknowledgement on highway markers and in a ceremony.

In 2003, Crabill's company, ViGYAN, Inc. was given the 100 Award by R&D Magazine for its Pilot Weather Advisor System. Crabill invented the system.

== Bibliography ==
Crabill wrote dozens of publications. They included the following.

- Virginia Airports: A Historical Survey of Airports and Aviation from the Earliest Days. with Vera Foster Rollo, Ph.D.
- "Virginia Aviation History Project Report ", Virginia Aviation History Project.
- "The NACA Wallops Experience 1945–1950", Virginia Aviation History Project.
- "South Norfolk Airport", Virginia Aviation History Project.
- "The NASA F53", Virginia Aviation History Project.
- "Jim Hall: From Cubs to Mosquitoes to NACA and NASA", Virginia Aviation History Project.
- Lift, Drag, Static Stability, and Buffet Boundaries of a Model of the McDonnell F3h-1N Airplane at Mach Numbers from 0.40 to 1.27, Ted No. NACA de 351. (2013) BiblioGov.
- Pilot's Automated Weather Support System (PAWSS) Concepts Demonstration Project. Phase 1. Pilot's Weather Information Requirements and Implications for Weather Data Systems Design. (1991).
