= Castel Cellesi =

Italian village in Tuscia at the meeting point of Northern Lazio, Umbria and Tuscany

Coordinates: 42°35′24″N 12°8′57″E

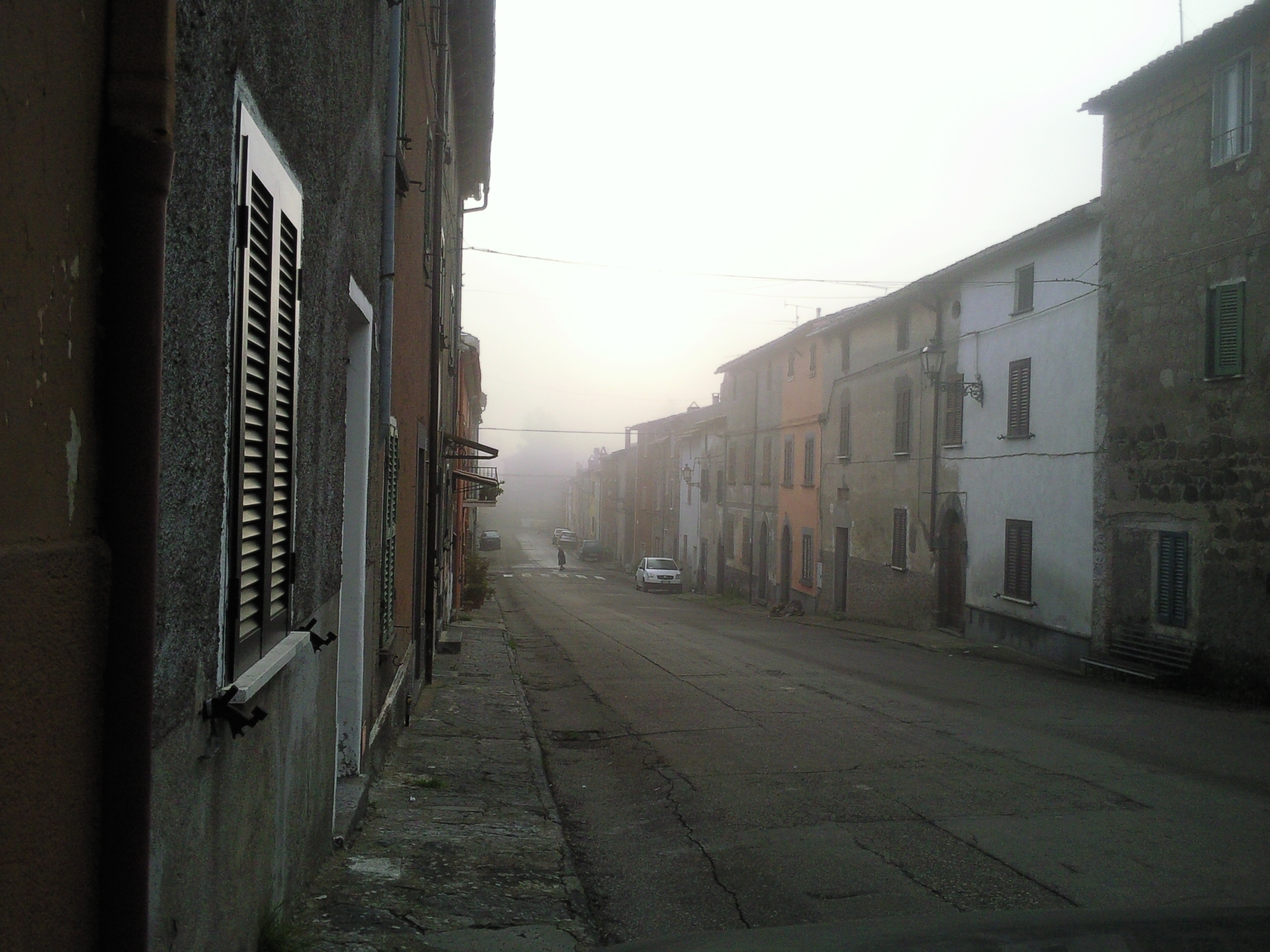
Fog in the street of Castel Cellesi

Castel Cellesi is an Italian village with a population of 200 located in the area of Tuscia at the meeting point of Northern Lazio, Umbria and Tuscany. It is a frazione of Bagnoregio, in the Province of Viterbo.

== History ==
Castel Cellesi was originally an enclosed square structure composed of small farm houses which surrounded a larger open space accessible through two main gates known as the “Upper Gate” and the “Lower Gate.” The Church and the Palace of Count Girolamo Cellesi were in the center of the village.

Gradually more farmers joined the first settlers and the village spread out of its lower gate. Another large square was then added on, rectangular in shape, encircled by small houses which all looked alike in color, shape and size. Count Cellesi had decreed that no building could be erected higher than the second floor of his own palace.

== Church ==
In the older of the two squares, one finds the Parish Church dedicated to Saint Girolamo. Its construction was commissioned by Count Girolamo Cellesi in 1664 and his monumental tomb is on the right hand wall entering the church. The building was restored and decorated with large frescoes in the late 19th century.

The interior of the church has only one nave, covered with a wood beam roof and three steps lead to the altar where the statue of St. Girolamo is located. A large wooden statue of the Virgin Mary in the Assumption into Heaven, highly venerated in Castelcellesi, is located on the left of the altar.

The most important monument of the village is the small church named after the Holy Sepulchre, founded by Count Girolamo Cellesi around 1674. It originates as a very modest chapel dedicated to the Madonna del Soccorso. Later, in 1703, another Count Cellesi, Francesco, had requested some Holy Relics from the Great Custodian of the Holy Land and started reconstruction of the chapel, enlarging it to twice its original size.

During the renovation, a large rock slab was found in the center of the new church site. Since it was not possible to remove it, they decided to erect a Shrine around it shaped like the Holy Sepulchre in the Holy Land. The Holy Relics arrived at Castel Cellesi at the end of February 1704 and were placed in the Shrine. The Church of the Holy Sepulchre was officially consecrated by the Bishop on March 7, 1704.

A Brotherhood was founded to take care of the Holy Sepulchre and of the Church. For almost two centuries, until the end of the 19th century, the Holy Sepulchre of Castelcellesi was the destination of countless pilgrims coming from all over the Tiber Valley. Even today it is one of the most important sites on the itinerary "Shrines of the Holy Sepulchre in Europe."

== Other features ==
Straight-tusked elephant fossils were found near the village in 2013.
