= Broglio Space Center =

Italian spaceport off the Kenyan coast

San Marco platform
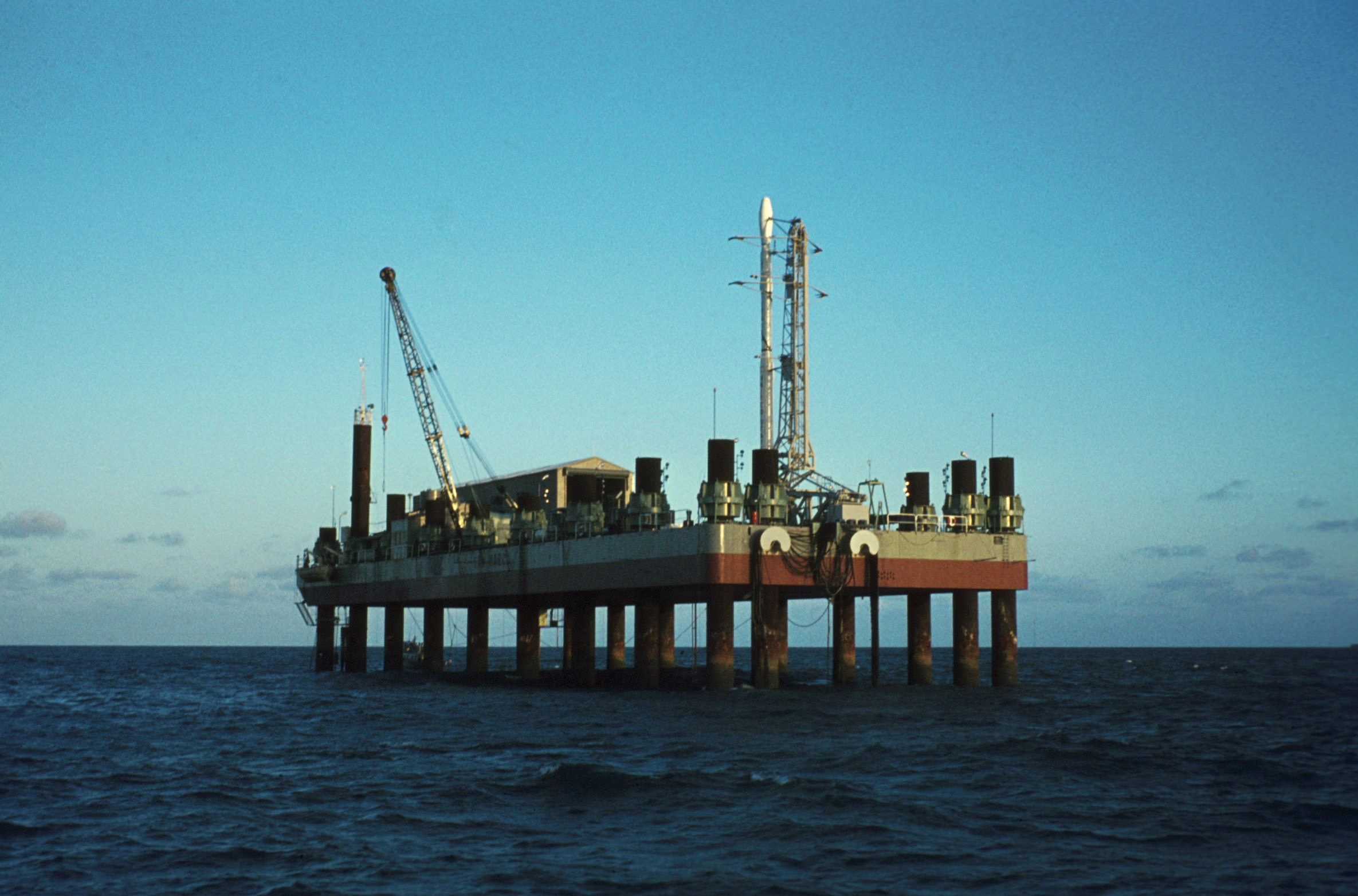
- The San Marco platform, with a Scout launch vehicle on the launch pad.
- Interactive map of San Marco platform
- Launch site: San Marco platform
- Location: Malindi, Kenya
- Coordinates: 2°56′18″S 40°12′45″E
- Operator: Italian Space Agency (formerly Sapienza University of Rome and NASA)
- Total launches: 27
- Launch pad: 2
- Orbital inclination range: 2.0–3.0°
San Marco launch history
- Status: Inactive
- Launches: 24
- First launch: 26 April 1967; Scout B
- Last launch: 25 March 1988; Scout G-1
- Associated rockets: Scout; Nike-Apache; Nike Tomahawk; Tomahawk; Arcas; Black Brant; Astrobee
Santa Rita launch history
- Status: Inactive
- Launches: 3
- First launch: 25 March 1964; Nike-Apache
- Last launch: 2 April 1964; Nike-Apache
- Associated rockets: Nike-Apache

The Luigi Broglio Malindi Space Center (LBMSC) located near Malindi, Kenya, is an Italian Space Agency (ASI) Spaceport. It was named after its founder and Italian space pioneer Luigi Broglio. Developed in the 1960s through a partnership between the Sapienza University of Rome's Aerospace Research Centre and the National Aeronautics and Space Administration (NASA), the BSC served as a spaceport for the launch of both Italian and international satellites (1967–1988). The center comprises a main offshore launch site, known as the San Marco platform, as well as two secondary control platforms and a communications ground station on the mainland.

In 2003, a legislative decree handed management of the center to ASI, beginning in 2004, and the name changed from the previous San Marco Equatorial Range. While the ground station is still in use for satellite communications, the BSC is not currently used as a launch site.

== History ==
The San Marco platform was a former oil platform, located to the north of Cape Ras Ngomeni on the coastal sublittoral of Kenya, at 2°56′18″S 40°12′45″E, close to the equator (which is an energetically favourable location for launches). Launches from the platform were controlled from the Santa Rita platform, a second former oil platform located southeast of the San Marco platform, and a smaller Santa Rita II housed the facility's radar. A ground station located on the cape forms the center's primary telemetry site.

Location of the BSC, just south of the equator (represented by the nearby town of Nanyuki)

The Italian space research program began in 1959 with the creation of the CRA (Centro Ricerche Aerospaziali) at the University of Rome. Three years later, on 7 September 1962, the university signed a memorandum of understanding with NASA to collaborate on a space research program named San Marco (St. Mark). The Italian launch team, trained by NASA, was to first launch test articles on a Shotput from Wallops Island under NASA supervision with the first launch successfully taking off on 15 December 1964. The San Marco project was focused on the launching of scientific satellites by Scout launch vehicles from a mobile rigid platform located close to the equator. This station, composed of 3 oil platforms and two logistical support boats, was installed off the Kenya coast, close to the town of Malindi.

The program schedule included three phases:

- Suborbital launches from Wallops Island and the equatorial platform,
- Orbital launch of an experimental satellite from Wallops Island,
- Orbital launches from the equatorial platform.

The San Marco launch platform complex was in use from March 1964 to March 1988, with a total of 27 launches, primarily sounding rockets including the Nike Apache, Nike Tomahawk, Arcas and Black Brant launchers. Low payload weight orbital launches were also made, using the solid-propellant Scout rocket (in its B, D and G subvariants). The first satellite specifically for X-ray astronomy, Uhuru, was launched from San Marco on a Scout B rocket on 12 December 1970.

The ground station is in use and continues to track ASI, ESA and NASA satellites, and Chinese crewed space missions.

However, the two platforms fell into disrepair during the 1990s. Since then, ASI has conducted a feasibility study to reactivate it for the Russian launcher START-1,^{[a]} and given significant decreases in the cost of satellite launches in the 2020s may serve the space programs of several African nations as well.

== Satellite launches ==
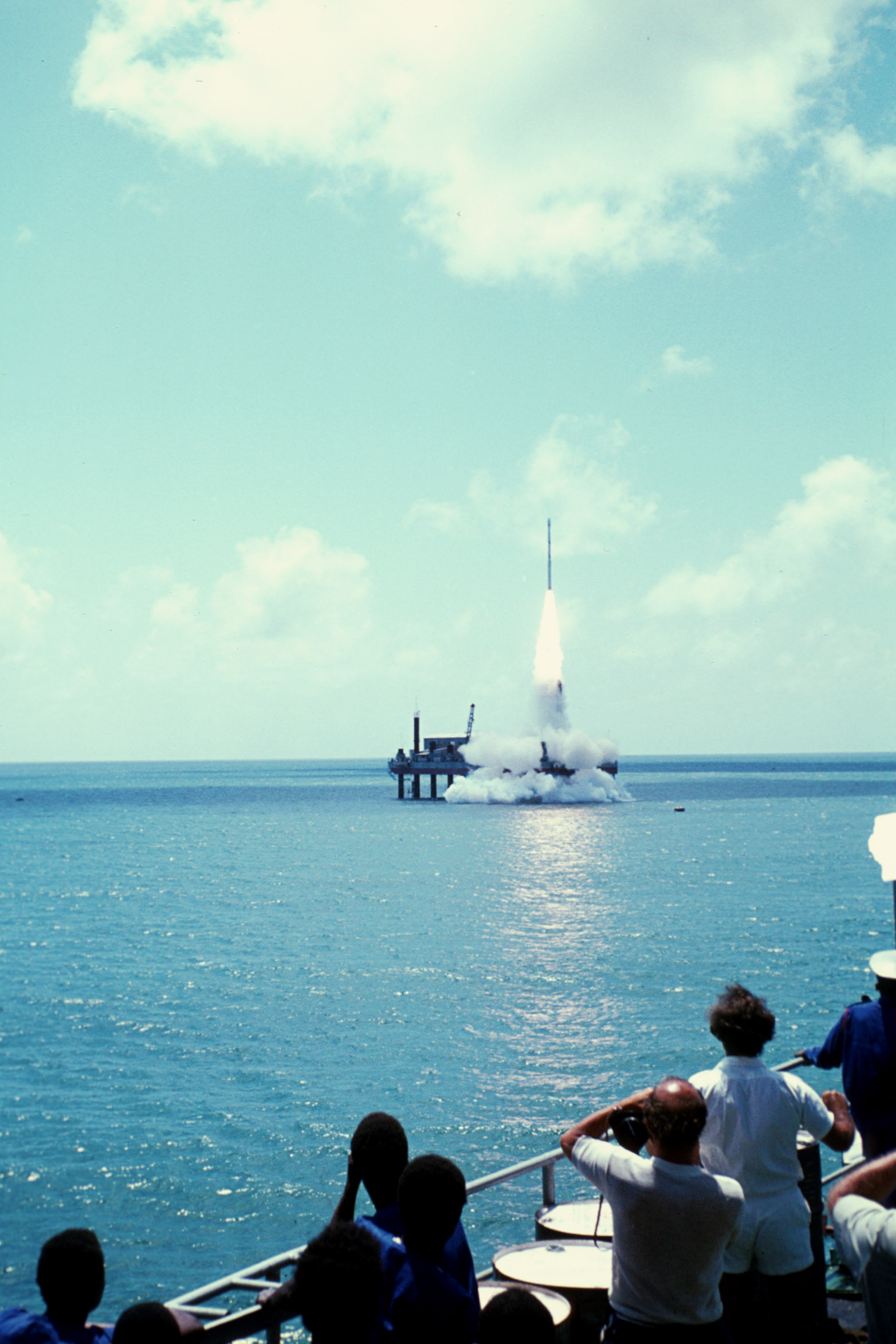
Ariel 5 launch from San Marco Platform

Launch Date	Vehicle	Payload	COSPAR ID	Comments
26 April 1967	Scout B	San Marco-2	1967-038A	San Marco 1 had previously been launched from Wallops in the United States
12 December 1970	Scout B	Uhuru (SAS-A)	1970-107A	
24 April 1971	Scout B	San Marco-3	1971-036A	
15 November 1971	Scout B	Small Scientific Satellite-A	1971-096A	
15 November 1972	Scout D-1	SAS-B	1972-091A	
18 February 1974	Scout D-1	San Marco-4	1974-009A	
15 October 1974	Scout B-1	Ariel 5	1974-077A	Satellite operations were directed from a control center at the Rutherford Appleton Laboratory, United Kingdom
7 May 1975	Scout F-1	SAS-C	1975-037A	
25 March 1988	Scout G-1	San Marco-D/L	1988-026A	

== See also ==
- San Marco programme
- Luigi Broglio
- Scout
- Italian Space Agency
- Sea Launch
- Kenya Space Agency

== Notes ==
- a. "Nel Marzo 2004, una Delegazione ASI e una Delegazione Russa sono state in visita al Centro Spaziale Luigi Broglio di Malindi, in Kenya, per verificare le condizioni tecniche di riutilizzo della base di lancio, mediante lanciatori russi, di tipo START-1. Il risultato della visita è stato estremamente positivo e le Parti hanno concordato sulla fattibilità di lancio dalle piattaforme marine."

(In March 2004, a delegation from ASI and a Russian delegation went to visit the Luigi Broglio Space Center in Malindi, Kenya, to verify the technical conditions of re-use of the launch site for use by Russian launchers of the type START-1. The result of the visit has been extremely positive and both parties have agreed on the feasibility of launching from the marine platform.)
