= Luigi Gussalli =

Italian mechanical engineer

Luigi Gussalli (1885–1950), engineer and inventor, was a pioneer of motor cars. He turned to astronautics in the 1920s, corresponding with world leaders in this field, such as Oberth and Goddard and exchanging with them theories on interplanetary flight and its prospects. He developed a special double-reaction engine, wrote extensively on multi-stage rockets and published two books on space travel. The first one, in 1923, described a space flight to the Moon, the second one, written in 1946, is even more astonishing in its theme: “Interplanetary travels by means of solar radiations”.

== Biography ==
Gussalli was born in Bologna on 18 December 1885 to Adele Rossetti and Odoardo Gussalli. From his earliest years he evinced a knack for mechanical engineering, building as he was a teenager, mechanical toys, steam-engined model cars and real model aeroplanes capable of flight. Like many astronautic pioneers, he was a keen reader of Science Fiction literature and “in his backyard he experimented with the launching of rockets, single, multiple, loaded with ballast, registering their behaviour in flight, their ascent, more or less straight, and extracting theories from such observations” as his friend Luigi Rossetti reports. Judging engineering diplomas ‘too much theoretical and mathematical’, he studied physics at Pavia and later at the Glons-Lieges Polytechnic in Belgium where he became an industrial engineer. Around the same years he started patenting inventions on many kinds of transport. During an Air Show in Montechiari, he got acquainted with the most famous flyers of the time, such as Blériot and Ghedi, and took to motor racing. In 1915 he served in World War I as a car driver, and then moved on to the Testing Commission as an engineer.

After World War I he devoted himself entirely to his inventions. In 1923, his book, "Can We Attempt a Space Journey to the Moon?" stirred quite an interest in the media which start comparing his experiences in rocketry to those of the USA scientist Goddard and the French Esnault-Pelterie. In 1930, at the 19th Convention of the Italian Society for the Progress of Sciences, he read his paper on 'Astronautics and Jet Propulsion' and suggested awarding an International Prize for Astronautical Altitude to foster enthusiasm 'towards Astronautics, so little known in Italy'. His suggestion was vetoed by the Scientific Committee of the Convention. The years between the two World Wars were to see an increasingly hostile relationship between Gussalli and the academic world and state institutions: he would often accuse the many scientific committees of shortsightedness, apathy and lack of intuition. These were also the years in which he was in regular correspondence with Goddard and Oberth. In 1941 he published his second book, 'Jet Propulsion for Astronautics: Reduction of Fuel Consumption Makes Possible Human Navigation in Space' or… Makes Space Exploration a Reality?', suggesting the use of a 'solar engine' as an auxiliary motor. Then he drew plans for a stratospheric airship. Between 1942 and the end of World War II he wrote his last book: 'Interplanetary Travel through Solar Radiations: a Fuel-Free Propulsion System (that needs no fuel) is the Key to Interplanetary Travel'. The book was published in 1946, both in Italian and English, drawing more attention abroad than in Italy. His last writing dates from June 1949. He addressed a letter to the Italian National Center for Research, the historical Accademia dei Lincei and the Italian Society for the Progress of Sciences, underlining analogies between his writings and the experiments being performed in the USA at the time on multiple-stage rockets, spaceships spinning on their axes to create artificial gravity and the development of a solar engine to power spacecraft. This letter, which is regarded as his last will and testament, in scientific terms, ends on a sour note, with him blaming the Italian scientific milieu for its disinterest in his theories. He died on June 23, 1950, at Barbano di Salo' in Northern Italy.

== “Can We Attempt a Space Journey to the Moon?” ==
In this work, Gussalli advocates using a four-stage rocket, the last stage for landing on the Moon and then flying back to Earth. Astronauts were supposed to travel in a thermically insulated capsule with an air supply system like a submarine. To avoid the sensation of free-falling the capsule would spin on itself and the astronauts would walk on the padded inside walls. The rotation system would make them feel 'as if they were lying in bed in a supine position'. As a propulsion system Gussalli suggested his 'double-reaction engine', consisting in a jet engine equipped with a sort of 'afterburner', i.e. exhaust fumes were diverted by the blades of a turbine powered by another engine, so as to boost its power. The second turbine, according to further research by Gussalli, was to be fuelled electrically, and the electrical power was to be transmitted to the capsule wirelessly from Earth, in order to reduce the paying load of the rocket. This last suggestion is a startling premonition of what is now called 'direct energy transmission', a possibility explored with the aim of realizing 'climbers' on space elevators.

== "Interplanetary Travel Exploiting Solar Radiations" ==
The leading theme of this book sounds even more prophetic: i.e. using solar radiations to push a spaceship into the void. The feasibility of this intuition would be explored by scientists only in the 1990s, half a century later. He called his project right after his name "Gussalli System 1946". The spacecraft looked very much like an airplane fuselage, with a large disc attached to the forward end with vents which could be opened and closed to modulate thrust. As an alternative, Gussalli proposed a large metallic sail, corresponding to the modern concept of a solar sail. But actually in Gussalli's spacecraft, the thrust was not supplied by direct solar pressure 'blowing' the spaceship through space, as is envisaged in contemporary studies on a 'solar sail'. In Gussalli idea, thrust was to be obtained by means of microscopic particles (he called them 'nebular strings') shot into space by another rocket; those particles, boosted by the sun's radiations, would create a 'solar wind' strong enough to propel the spacecraft by striking its sail. The project was rejected as unfeasible by the British Interplanetary Society due to the impossibility of providing the required thrust, as well as by the USA NACA, that pointed out the difficulty of calculating (a) the right size of an efficient sail, (b) the exact amount of the 'dust' to be shot into space, and (c) the dispersion ratio of the particles. In the same work, Gussalli suggested another innovative method to slow down spaceships on their way back to Earth: the aero-braking, widely used later on in aeronautics and astronautics, well after his time. Such ideas, even allowing for inevitable mistakes and imprecision in a still computer-less age, show beyond any doubt that he had a 360 degree vision of the matter, anticipating in many ways future discoveries and applications.

In 1995, a minor planet was discovered and named after him.

== Bibliography ==
- Giovanni Caprara (a cura di), Luigi Gussalli pioniere dello spazio, DGM Brescia
- Filippo Graziani, La Scuola di Scuola Ingegneria Aerospaziale nell’ottantesimo anniversario della sua fondazione, 2006
