= Exolaunch =

European satellite launch provider

- Formerly: ECM
- Type: Private
- Industry: Aerospace
- Founded: January 2010; 16 years ago
- Founder: Dmitriy Sternharz
- Headquarters: Berlin, Denver (2021), Tokyo (2025), Toulouse (2025)
- Number of locations: 4
- Area served: Worldwide
- Key people: Robert Sproles (CEO), Dmitriy Sternharz, Founder and President, Jeanne Allarie (CCO, CMO), Kier Fortier, VP of Global Business Development
- Products: EXOpod, CarboNIX, EXObox, EXOtube, Quadro
- Website: exolaunch.com

Exolaunch GmbH (formerly known as ECM) is a German launch services, mission management, and deployment systems provider based in Berlin, Germany with offices in the U.S., France and Japan. The company's main focus is the deployment of small satellites, ranging from CubeSats to microsatellites. In June 2026, private equity firm EQT agreed to acquire Exolaunch from founder Dmitriy Sternharz, marking EQT's first private-equity investment in the space sector.

== History ==
Exolaunch was a spin-off from Technische Universität Berlin. Since its founding, Exolaunch has supported the deployment of over 575 satellites. Exolaunch has provided mission management and launch services for payloads on Falcon 9, Falcon Heavy, Ariane 6, PSLV, European Soyuz, Soyuz and Electron rockets and has announced agreements with SpaceX and New Space India Limited. The company specialises in rideshare launches, in which small satellites are deployed as secondary payloads in a launch, alongside the usually larger primary payloads.

In total, around one third of Spire Global's constellation of Lemur satellites have been supported by Exolaunch since 2016. Momentus Space and Exolaunch announced a partnership in July 2017 relating to the provision of water plasma propulsion technologies for use in payload delivery. In August 2018, Iceye announced an agreement with Exolaunch to launch two or more satellites with synthetic-aperture radar. Exolaunch's second-largest rideshare mission to date took place in July 2019 on the Soyuz-2 launch vehicle. The mission consisted of the deployment of 28 smallsats which included 25 CubeSats ranging from 0.25U to 16U and two commercial microsatellites. This launch also saw the qualification of Exolaunch's microsatellite separation system, CarboNIX. The smallest satellite that the company has managed rideshare integration was only 2.5 cm (0.98 in) tall.

=== Partnerships with SpaceX ===
As of 2025, Exolaunch has launched 400 satellites from 20 SpaceX vehicles, which includes every SpaceX Bandwagon and SpaceX Transporter rideshare flight since inception. Exolaunch's largest mission to date was the Transporter 14, on the SpaceX Falcon 9, in June 2025, with 27 payloads and over 1,500 kg of mass. In 2025, Exolaunch signed launch contracts with SpaceX, for Exolaunch’s small satellite launch capacity through 2028, to serve satellites on-orbit, including from HawkEye360, ICEYE, Planet Labs, EndudoSat, Loft, and Capella Space.

=== History of Exolaunch missions ===
Launch Vehicle	Launch Authority	Launch site	Exolaunch Mission Name	Launch Date (UTC)	Mission Description	Status
Soyuz-2	Glavcosmos		Bion-M	2013-04-19 00:00 UTC	0 Microsats, 3 Cubesats	Launched
Soyuz-2	Glavcosmos		Kanopus-V-IK	2017-07-14 00:00 UTC	2 Microsats, 13 Cubesats	Launched
Soyuz-2	Glavcosmos		Meteor-M 2-1	2017-11-28 00:00 UTC	0 Microsats, 14 Cubesats	Launched
Soyuz-2	Glavcosmos		Kanopus-V 3,4	2018-02-01 00:00 UTC	4 Microsats, 5 Cubesats	Launched
Soyuz-2	Glavcosmos		Kanopus-V 5,6	2018-12-27 00:00 UTC	0 Microsats, 11 Cubesats	Launched
Soyuz-2	Glavcosmos		Meteor-M 2-2	2019-07-05 00:00 UTC	3 Microsats, 25 Cubesats	Launched
Electron	Rocket Lab	Mahia	As the Crow Flies	2019-10-17 00:00 UTC	0 Microsats, 1 Cubesats	Launched
Soyuz-2	Glavcosmos		COSMO-SkyMed	2019-12-18 00:00 UTC	0 Microsats, 1 Cubesats	Launched
Falcon 9	SpaceX	Cape Canaveral	Starlink 9	2020-06-13 00:00 UTC	3 Microsats, 0 Cubesats	Launched
Falcon 9	SpaceX	Cape Canaveral	Starlink 11	2020-08-18 00:00 UTC	3 Microsats, 0 Cubesats	Launched
Soyuz-2	Glavcosmos		Gonetz-M 16	2020-09-28 00:00 UTC	3 Microsats, 12 Cubesats	Launched
Falcon 9	SpaceX	Cape Canaveral	Transporter-1	2021-01-24 00:00 UTC	3 Microsats, 27 Cubesats	Launched
Falcon 9	SpaceX	Cape Canaveral	Transporter-2	2021-06-30 00:00 UTC	10 Microsats, 19 Cubesats	Launched
Falcon 9	SpaceX	Cape Canaveral	Transporter-3	2022-01-13 00:00 UTC	23 Microsats, 6 Cubesats	Launched
Falcon 9	SpaceX	Cape Canaveral	Transporter-4	2022-04-01 00:00 UTC	6 Microsats, 6 Cubesats	Launched
Falcon 9	SpaceX	Cape Canaveral	Transporter-5	2022-05-25 00:00 UTC	9 Microsats, 13 Cubesats	Launched
Electron	Rocket Lab	Mahia	Catch Me If You Can	2022-11-05 00:00 UTC	1 Microsats, 0 Cubesats	Launched
Falcon 9	SpaceX	Cape Canaveral	Transporter-6	2023-01-03 00:00 UTC	9 Microsats, 28 Cubesats	Launched
Falcon 9	SpaceX	Vandenberg	Transporter-7	2023-04-14 00:00 UTC	5 Microsats, 17 Cubesats	Launched
Falcon Heavy	SpaceX	Vandenberg	Falcon Heavy - Viasat 3.1	2023-05-01 00:00 UTC	0 Microsats, 1 Cubesats	Launched
Falcon 9	SpaceX	Vandenberg	Transporter-8	2023-06-12 00:00 UTC	12 Microsats, 21 Cubesats	Launched
PSLV	ISRO		PSLV C56	2023-07-17 00:00 UTC	0 Microsats, 1 Cubesats	Launched
Electron	Rocket Lab	Mahia	Baby Come Back	2023-07-18 00:00 UTC	1 Microsats, 0 Cubesats	Launched
Falcon 9	SpaceX	Vandenberg	Transporter-9	2023-11-07 00:00 UTC	6 Microsats, 29 Cubesats	Launched
Electron	Rocket Lab	Mahia	Four of a Kind	2024-01-15 00:00 UTC	0 Microsats, 4 Cubesats	Launched
Falcon 9	SpaceX	Vandenberg	Transporter-10	2024-03-01 00:00 UTC	12 Microsats, 16 Cubesats	Launched
Falcon 9	SpaceX	Cape Canaveral	Bandwagon-1	2024-04-07 00:00 UTC	4 Microsats, 0 Cubesats	Launched
Electron	Rocket Lab	Mahia	Beginning of the Swarm	2024-04-21 00:00 UTC	0 Microsats, 1 Cubesats	Launched
Ariane 6	Arianespace	CSG	A6 FM1	2024-07-14 00:00 UTC	0 Microsats, 5 Cubesats	Launched
Falcon 9	SpaceX	Vandenberg 398	Transporter-11	2024-08-16 18:18 UTC	15 Microsats, 29 Cubesats	Launched
Falcon 9	SpaceX	VSFB	Bandwagon-2	2024-12-20 11:58 UTC	7 Microsats, 18 Cubesats	Launched
Falcon 9	SpaceX	Vandenberg 398	Transporter-12	2025-01-14 19:09 UTC	14 Microsats, 22 Cubesats	Launched
Falcon 9	SpaceX	CCSFB	Intuitive Machines-2	2025-02-27 00:06 UTC	2 Microsats, 1 Cubesats	Launched
Falcon 9	SpaceX	Vandenberg 398	Transporter-13	2025-03-15 06:39 UTC	10 Microsats, 17 Cubesats	Launched
Electron	Rocket Lab	Mahia	Spire Ororatech RocketLab	2025-03-26 15:50 UTC	0 Microsats, 8 Cubesats	Launched
Falcon 9	SpaceX	CCSFB	Bandwagon-3	2025-04-22 00:00 UTC	1 Microsats, 0 Cubesats	Launched
Falcon 9	SpaceX	VSFB SLC-4	Transporter-14	2025-06-23 21:25 UTC	24 Microsats, 21 Cubesats	Launched
Electron	Rocket Lab	Mahia	Kestrel-0A RocketLab	2025-06-26 17:00 UTC	0 Microsats, 1 Cubesats	Launched
Confidential	Confidential	Confidential	Confidential Launch		1 Microsats, 0 Cubesats	Launched
Falcon 9	SpaceX	VSFB SLC-4	NAOS	2025-08-26 18:52 UTC	6 Microsats, 0 Cubesats	Active

== Manufacture ==
Exolaunch designs and manufactures in-house small satellite deployment systems, EXOpod for CubeSats and CarboNIX for microsatellites. It also manufactures EXObox, a deployment sequencer to manage the deployment of up to 50 satellites.

=== EXOpod ===
The EXOpod is a CubeSat deployer which comes in two size variants, 12U and 16U, and can be configured with up to four independent slots. CubeSats in EXOpod are provided with more space for payloads and can be heavier than what is specified in the CubeSat Design Specification limits. Windows on two sides of the deployer provide access to the CubeSat, enabling inspection, testing and RBF pin removal after integration. EXOpods have been used to launch 80 CubeSats ranging from 0.25U to 16U in size since 2017. The system is made in Germany and is not subject to export restrictions of any kind.

=== CarboNIX ===
CarboNIX is a separation system for smallsats with a wet mass (including fuel) of between 10 and 200 kg. The lack of traditional pyrotechnic method, reduces the risk of damaging satellites with optical payloads and electronic components. This is combined with a spring pusher system that separates the satellite before the shocks are generated. It is also produced in Germany and ITAR – free meaning that the system is not subject to export restrictions of any kind.

=== EXObox ===
EXObox is a deployment sequencer for managing satellite cluster deployment, with a capacity of up to 50 smallsats. It aims to simplify the adaptation and separation of small satellites into their target orbits.

=== EXOtube ===
EXOtube unites the entire ecosystem of Exolaunch technologies for rideshare missions

== Past missions ==
The company cooperated under commercial contracts with Glavkosmos in the past, using Soyuz-2 rockets to launch European and U.S. small satellites with the last launch in 2020. The Uzbek-born former CEO, Dmitry Sternharz, took his family’s last name in 2022.

== See also ==
- Exolaunch Official Site
