= San Marco 1 =

First Italian satellite

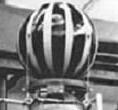
- Mission type: Ionospheric; Earth science Astrophysics
- Operator: CNR
- COSPAR ID: 1964-084A
- SATCAT no.: 00957
- Mission duration: ~272 days

Spacecraft properties
- Launch mass: 115.2 kilograms (254 lb)

Start of mission
- Launch date: 15 December 1964, 20:24:00 UTC
- Rocket: Scout X-4
- Launch site: Wallops LA-3A

End of mission
- Decay date: 13 September 1965

Orbital parameters
- Reference system: Geocentric
- Regime: Low Earth
- Eccentricity: 0.0469
- Perigee altitude: 198.0 kilometres (123.0 mi)
- Apogee altitude: 846.0 kilometres (525.7 mi)
- Inclination: 37.80 degrees
- Period: 94.9 minutes
- Epoch: 15 December 1964 20:24:00 UTC

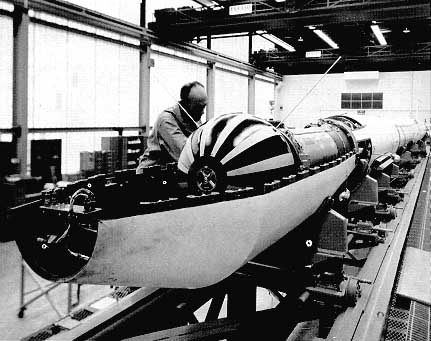
San Marco 1 being loaded into the Scout rocket fairing

San Marco 1, also known as San Marco A, was the first Italian satellite. Built in-house by the Italian Space Research Commission (Italian: Commissione per le Ricerche Spaziali, CRS) on behalf of the National Research Council, it was the first of five as part of the Italian-US San Marco programme.

The name of the spacecraft series comes from the San Marco platform, a Jackup barge used as an offshore launch pad for the main phase of the project. San Marco (English: Saint Mark) is the patron saint of Venice, often depicted as aiding Venetian sailors.

== Development ==
In 1961 the Italian government, led by Amintore Fanfani, approved a plan for the development of an indigenous satellite research programme that had earlier been proposed by the CRS. At the time only the Soviet Union and the United States had launched spacecraft into orbit and Italy lacked a suitable launcher and crews trained in firing orbital rockets. As a result, a cooperative plan was developed with the American space agency NASA who would provide the rockets and the launch crew training for Italians to operate them.

The spacecraft was built by members of the CRS, a group of distinguished Italian scientists and engineers including Edoardo Amaldi, co-founder of major European scientific organisations including CERN and ESRO.

The mission was principally a test-flight of a real satellite to gain experience before launches from Italy's own San Marco platform began, the last of 3 phases of the project.

== Mission ==
The primary mission of the San Marco series was to conduct ionospheric (upper-atmosphere) research. As a test satellite San Marco 1 contained relatively few experiments;

- Atmosphere, an Ion probe.
- Electron-content Beacon, a radio transmitter to study ionospheric effects on long-range radio communication.

== Launch ==
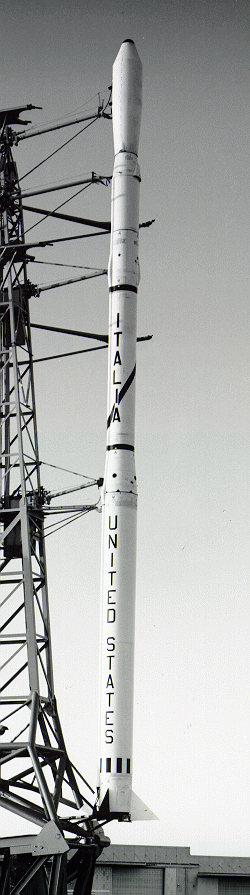
Scout X-4 with San Marco 1

San Marco 1 was launched by an Italian crew using an American Scout rocket from Wallops Flight Facility, Virginia, US. Launched on 15 December 1964 at 20:24:00 UTC the satellite destructively re-entered the atmosphere on 13 September 1965.

== See also ==
- San Marco programme
- Italian National Research Council
- Scout rocket
- Wallops Flight Facility
- Broglio Space Centre - formerly San Marco Equatorial Range
- Timeline of artificial satellites and space probes
