= San Marco programme =

Italian satellite launch program

External videos
- Italian Ministry of Defence – San Marco 3 (San Marco C) programme from development to launch

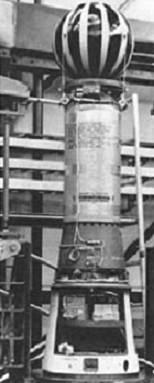
The San Marco 1 satellite in checkout at Wallops Flight Facility.

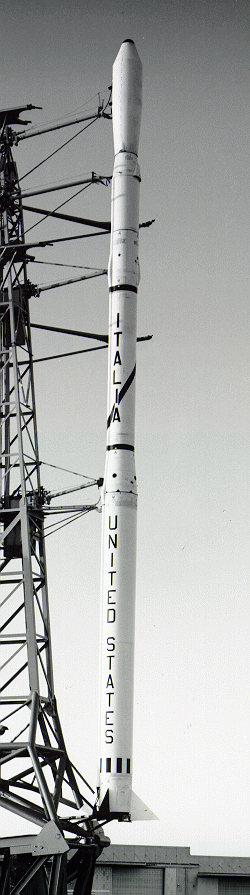
Scout X-4 rocket with San Marco 1

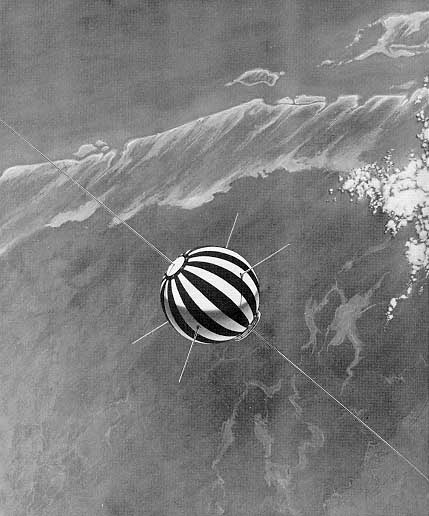
San Marco 2 satellite illustration

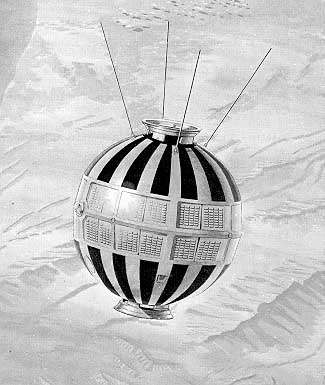
San Marco 3 satellite illustration

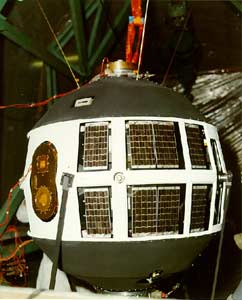
San Marco D/L Satellite

The San Marco programme was an Italian satellite launch programme conducted between the early 1960s and the late 1980s. The project resulted in the launch of the first Italian-built satellite, San Marco 1, on 15 December 1964. With the programme Italy became the third country in the world to operate a launch with its own crew, after the Soviet Union and the United States, and the fifth to operate its own satellites after also Canada, and the United Kingdom (earlier Canadian and British satellites had been launched relying on American facilities and crews).

San Marco was a collaboration between the Italian Space Research Commission (CRS) (a branch of the National Research Council), led by Luigi Broglio and Edoardo Amaldi, and NASA.

In total 5 satellites were launched during the programme, all using American Scout rockets. The first flew from Wallops Flight Facility with the rest conducted from the San Marco Equatorial Range. The last satellite, San Marco-D/L, launched on 25 March 1988.

== History ==
Luigi Broglio was assigned leadership of the force's Ammunition Research Unit in 1956, responsible for the military's rocket programme, by General Secretary of Aeronautics Mario Pezzi. The unit ran the Salto di Quirra rocket test range on Sardinia and Broglio would have his first experience of working with American rocketeers when the AMI was involved in weather experiments using Nike-Cajun rockets to release sodium clouds for study.

While Soviet and American teams had been working on plans for orbiting research satellites for a number of years, the launch on 4 October 1957 of the world's first artificial satellite, Sputnik 1, began the Space Race in earnest and America soon launched its own Explorer 1 system in response. After Sputnik there was a desire from other countries to enter this new field of research and technological capability.

In February 1961 Broglio introduced the idea to Prime Minister Amintore Fanfani that Italy should pursue a satellite research programme of its own, launched from its own facility. Although conceived as a national programme, sourcing of foreign launchers was accepted to accomplish the goal. In that same year, at a meeting of the Committee on Space Research (COSPAR) in Florence, Broglio had discussions with some NASA officials present and proposed the idea of the US supplying launchers and training Italian ground crews to fire them for this effort.

The San Marco programme was approved by the Italian government in October 1961 with a formal Memorandum of Understanding between the CRS (represented by Broglio) and NASA (represented by Hugh Dryden) being signed on 31 May 1962. The plan was for the US to provide the Scout rockets and train the Italian ground crew while Italy would develop the satellites and provide the launch pad. The Italian oil company Eni provided the San Marco platform, a mobile Jackup barge that could be towed to an equatorial location, which when combined with an easterly firing provides the most energetically favourable launch. Test flights using Shotput rockets as well as the first San Marco satellite would be launched from the America's Wallops Flight Facility as training for the Italian ground crew in preparation for future launches.

While all launches were successful, Italy would go on to primarily pursue cooperation through European Launcher Development Organisation and the European Space Research Organisation and ultimately their successor the European Space Agency.

== Missions ==
Launch Date	Vehicle	Site	Payload	NSSDC ID	Comments
21 April 1963	Shotput	Wallops		N/A	San Marco Test 1
02 August 1963	Shotput	Wallops		N/A	San Marco Test 2
15 December 1964	Scout-X4	Wallops	San Marco 1	1964-084A	San Marco A
26 April 1967	Scout B	San Marco	San Marco 2	1967-038A	San Marco B
24 April 1971	Scout B	San Marco	San Marco 3	1971-036A	San Marco C
18 February 1974	Scout D-1	San Marco	San Marco 4	1974-009A	San Marco C2
1 July 1983	Scout G-1	San Marco	San Marco D/M	SANM-DM	Cancelled
25 March 1988	Scout G-1	San Marco	San Marco D/L	1988-026A	

== See also ==
- Luigi Broglio
- Wallops Flight Facility
- Scout
- Broglio Space Centre – modern name of the San Marco Equatorial Range
