= Lundmark =

Lundmark is a Swedish surname. Notable people with the surname include:

- Anne Lundmark (born 1946), Swedish orienteering competitor
- Charles Lundmark (1927–1999), American sprint canoeist
- Curt Lundmark (born 1944), Swedish ice hockey coach
- Jamie Lundmark (born 1981), Canadian ice hockey player
- Karl-Gösta Lundmark (1919–1995), Swedish Army lieutenant general
- Kenneth Lundmark (born 1946), Swedish high jumper
- Knut Lundmark (1889–1958), Swedish astronomer
- Pekka Lundmark (born 1963), Finnish business executive and CEO of Nokia
- Thomas C. Lundmark (1949–2026), American lawyer and legal scholar

== See also ==
- Lundmark (crater), a lunar crater
- Thompson-Lundmark Mine, a gold mine near Yellowknife, Northwest Territories
- Wolf-Lundmark-Melotte, an irregular galaxy located on the outer edges of the local group
