= Frida Palmer =

First Swedish female PHd in Astronomy

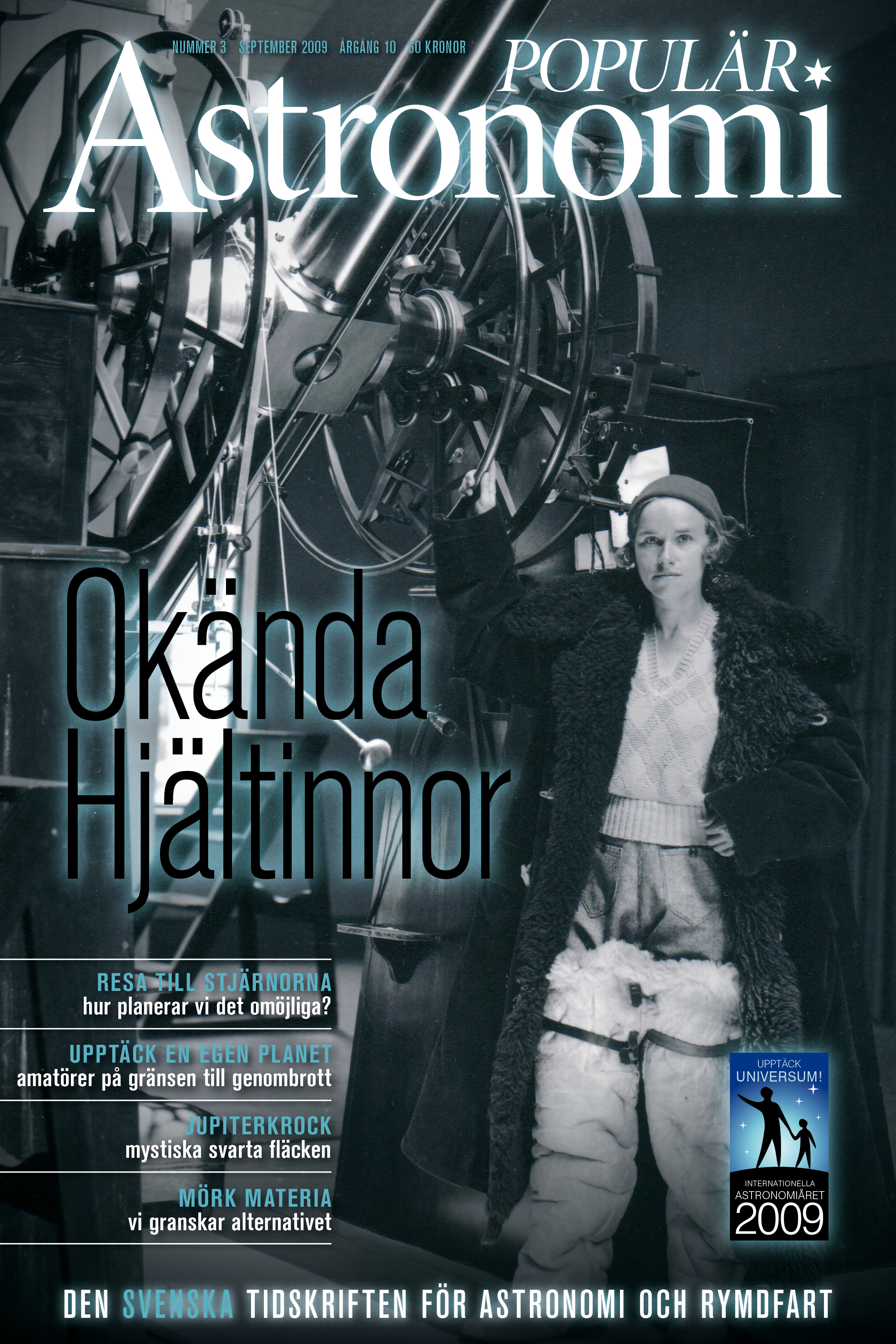
- The cover of the journal Popular Astronomy, September 3, 2009. The photograph shows the doctoral student Frida Palmér at the Meridian Circle, Lund Observatory, 1929.
- Born: February 14, 1905; Blentarp, Sweden
- Died: October 13, 1966 (aged 61); Halmstad, Sweden
- Citizenship: Swedish
- Education: Seminarian
- Known for: Variable stars
- Scientific career
- Fields: Astronomer
- Doctoral advisor: Knut Lundmark

Frida Palmér (February 14, 1905 - October 13, 1966) was the first female Swedish astronomer with a doctorate. She studied variable stars.

== Early life ==
Palmér was born on February 14, 1905, in Blentarp, Sweden, the only child to builder Hans Persson Palmér and his wife Elsa Jeppsson. Her father died when she was five years old and in 1910 Elsa moved to Järrestad. It is unclear how she finished her early education but she must have been somewhat self-taught as access to high school was not formally established for girls until 1928.

== Education ==
In the fall of 1925, Palmér studied at the Faculty of Philosophy in Lund where she studied astronomy and mathematics under her mentor and friend, Knut Lundmark. In 1930, she was granted resources to travel and visit observatories abroad in Prague, Vienna, Budapest, Potsdam, Danzig (now Gdansk) and Berlin. She was noticed, as she was a young woman in a field dominated by men.

She defended her thesis in 1939 at Lund University on a thesis on irregular variable stars with Knut Lundmark as supervisor. She is the first Swedish female doctor in astronomy.

== Career ==
She listed over 259 stars with irregular periodicity variability, examined their galactic distribution, arranged by spectral type. Most spectra lacked the lines typical of the Mira variable stars. She discovered that the light curves of some stars could be interpreted as interference between two or more simultaneous, periodic events in the stars.

Her academic career was stopped short because of World War II and she started work at the Swedish National Defence Radio Establishment as a cryptographer systems analyst. Palmer decoded Soviet marine signaling messages in the Arctic Ocean. Palmer never got any real recognition from cryptography colleagues Gunnar Blom and Sven Wäsström, who considered her an insignificant "star analyst".

The Supreme Chief, Commander Torgil Thorén, however, stated in 1943 that she always "attended to prompt perception, energy and a clear sense of order" and that "she always included the work with interest and diligence and observed impeccable and honest conduct".

In 1945, while still employed at FRA, she published a list of another 98 red variable stars, the largest uniform compilation of non-Mira variable stars. She was seriously considered for a travel scholarship for "academically educated women" to do research in the United States but was not chosen. In 1945, at only 41 she gave up on her career as an astronomer to become a professor in Halmstad and look after her aging mother. While a qualified and dedicated teacher she had low tolerance for students who did not understand mathematics and physics. Her students feared going up to the blackboard to answer questions in front of her. She certainly did not enjoy being a teacher and yearned to return to her previous life.

When Elsa died Frida opened her social circle and started an Association for Working Women in Stockholm. She continued to travel and went to Cairo, Egypt in 1963.

== Death ==
Palmér died on October 13, 1966, in Halmstad, Sweden. The Frida Palmér Observatory at Halmstad University in south Sweden is named after her.
