= Stig Bergling =

Swede who spied for USSR (1937–2015)

- Born: Stig Svante Eugén Bergling; 1 March 1937; Stockholm, Sweden
- Died: 24 January 2015 (aged 77); Stockholm, Sweden
- Burial place: Kungsholms Cemetery
- Other name: "Stickan"
- Occupations: Police, reserve officer
- Spouses: Marianne Rinman (m. 1961–1965) Kyllikki Kyyrö (m. 1965–1973) Elisabeth Sjögren (m. 1986; died 1997) Helena Smejko (m. 1998–2002) (m. 2003–2004)
- Children: 1 son
- Espionage activity
- Allegiance: Soviet Union
- Service years: 1972–1979, 1987–1994
- Rank: Colonel (Soviet)

Stig Svante Eugén Bergling, later Stig Svante Eugén Sandberg (Note: When Bergling married Elisabeth (née Sjögren) in 1986 he changed his name to Eugén Sandberg. Eugén was one of his original given names and Sandberg was his mother's maiden name.) and Stig Svante Eugén Sydholt, (Note: According to Bergling himself, Sydholt was one of the Swedish Patent and Registration Office suggested names. He had closed his eyes and put down his finger on the name of Sydholt.) (1 March 1937 – 24 January 2015) was a Swedish Security Service officer who spied for the Soviet Union. The Stig Bergling-affair, one of Sweden's greatest spy scandals, began when he was arrested in Israel in 1979 by Israeli counterintelligence and in the same year in Sweden was sentenced to life imprisonment for aggravated espionage. He escaped in 1987, with the assistance of his then–wife Elisabeth Sjögren during a conjugal visit, and fled to Moscow. Bergling's escape was a major embarrassment for Sweden's liberal prison system and prompted the resignation of the justice minister.

Bergling lived for several years in the Soviet Union, Hungary and Lebanon until, for health reasons, he voluntarily returned to Sweden in 1994. He continued to serve his sentence until 1997, when he was paroled. During the last years of his life, Bergling lived in a Stockholm nursing home and had been diagnosed with Parkinson's disease. He died there on 24 January 2015, at 77 years old.

== Early life ==
Bergling was born on 1 March 1937 in Kungsholm Parish in the City of Stockholm, Sweden. His father, who came from a wealthy home in Sala, was an engineer and worked with general insurance at an insurance company. Bergling's mother, who came from a working class home in Falun, had a strictly religious upbringing and worked as a secretary during Bergling's upbringing. Bergling had a younger sister. He attended Carlssons skola, a private school in Östermalm, Stockholm, and then attended Östra Real. In 1957, he did his military service as a coastal ranger at the Vaxholm Coastal Artillery Regiment (KA 1) in Vaxholm. He also became a reserve officer and advanced to the rank of lieutenant in the "Blocking Battalion Bråviken" where Bergling was responsible for security matters. The battalion had – in the event of war – the task to defend the inlet to Oxelösund and its surroundings.

== Säpo, Fst/Säk and overseas service ==
In 1958 he began working at Östermalm police station at the same time as Tore Forsberg. Forsberg was the man who was to become the head of the Swedish counterintelligence and later be one of the men who disclosed Bergling. After some time, Bergling started working within radiopolisen and then the utlänningsroteln ("alien department"). After having worked as a police officer for 10 years, Bergling was employed in 1969 at the Swedish Security Service (Säpo) and worked at the Bureau II, the surveillance unit, the unit engaged in counterintelligence against Soviet Union agents in Sweden. In 1971, Bergling was on temporary leave from Säpo and began working at the Defence Staff's Security Department (Fst/Säk). In his new role as a liaison officer between the Säpo and the Defence Staff, he participated in the work to map the Soviet diplomats' activities in Sweden. Meanwhile, at Fst/Säk, Bergling copied a binder with classified documents. The binder contained the so-called fortification code, or FO code (Fortifikationskoden), the top-secret list of Sweden's defence facilities, coastal artillery fortifications, mobilization stores, command centers and radar stations. Bergling needed the information for his work at the Defence Staff, some times for long periods of time and it was impractical for him to return the original every day. He got permission from one of his superiors to obtain a copy of it. When Bergling was later to return it, he became angry with one of his superiors, Bengt Wallroth (later Director-General of the National Defence Radio Establishment) who started arguing and criticizing him. Bergling disliked the Defence Staff and Wallroth and instead of destroying the copy he kept it and put it in a safe deposit box at Erik Dahlbergsgatan in Stockholm.

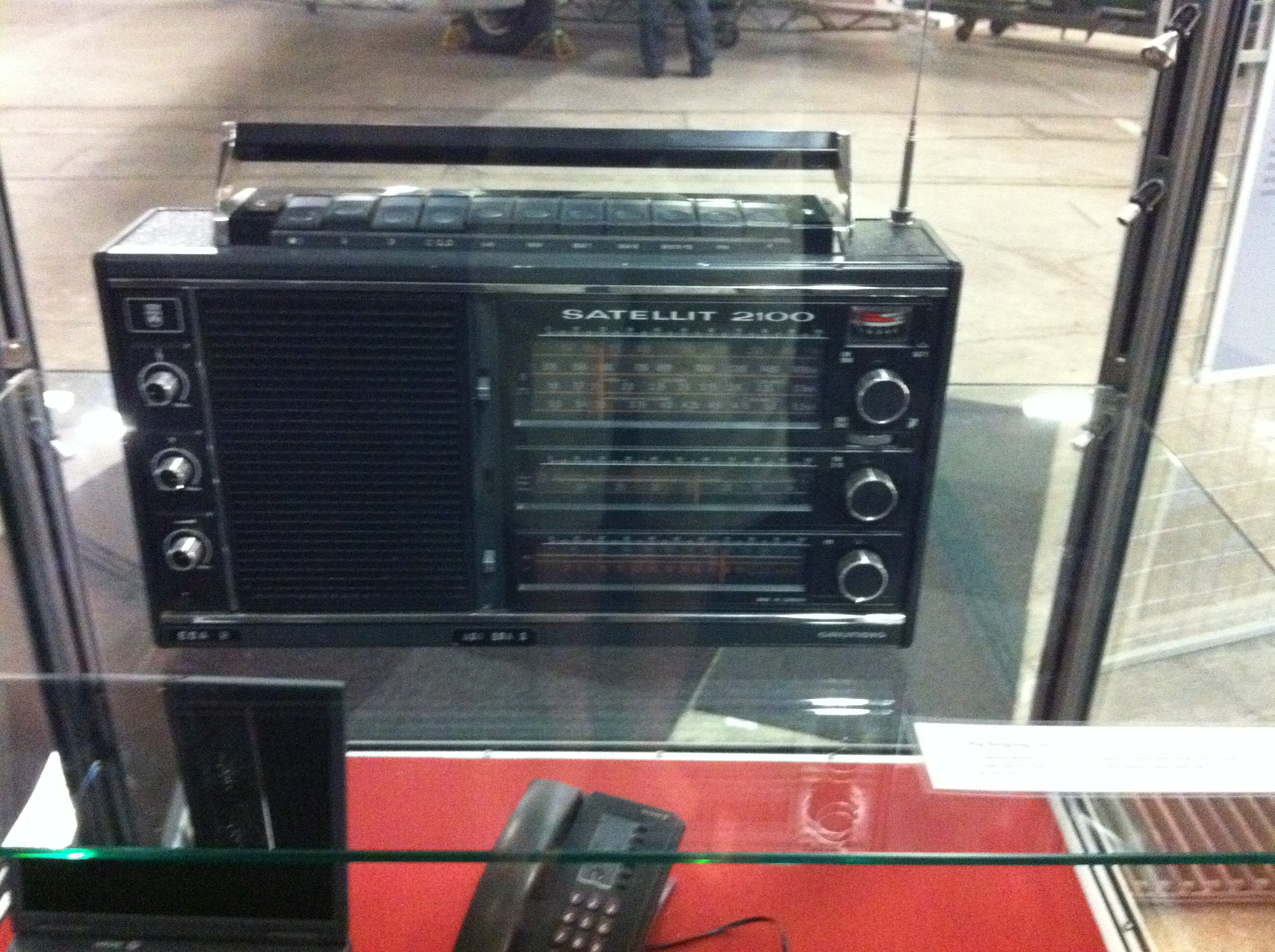
Bergling's shortwave radio with which he could receive Moscow's orders to him.

Alongside the work home in Sweden, Bergling served several times in various UN battalions around the world. Bergling was a reserve officer in the Swedish Coastal Artillery, and in 1968 he was stationed in Cyprus as a military police chief. In November 1972 he came to the Middle East as a UN observer, at first in Israel and the following year in Lebanon. At that time, GRU officer Alexander Nikiforov was working as military attaché in the Soviet Embassy in Beirut. Bergling was in need of money and went to the Soviet Embassy and offered Nikiforov the copied binder with secret information. In November 1973, Bergling switched duty tour in Lebanon with a Belgian major so he could go to Stockholm and retrieve the binder. He flew from Stockholm via Budapest to Beirut and on the 30 November 1973, he sold the copied binder with the documents to the Soviets. Bergling received 3,500 dollars for it and was later told, after the binder had been examined in Moscow, that "we already have this information, ours is just a bit older."

Bergling stayed as an UNTSO observer another year in the Middle East and returned home in January 1975, and was then back at the Security Service and the so-called "Russian Division" (Ryssroteln) where he previously worked. Bergling's contact, Alexander Nikiforov, had realized that as a newly acquired Soviet agent, Bergling would be able to do more good in Sweden. Back at Säpo, Bergling was instructed by the Soviets to investigate what the Soviet intelligence men did wrong. The errors were reported by Bergling to Moscow who called them back home. To get in touch with the Soviets he wrote letters with "invisible writing", which was done with the help of carbon paper. The writings were then presented with a special liquid. He got messages back using a shortwave radio.

However, it was not in the Middle East where Bergling was trained as a spy but in East Germany. As an employee of the Security Service, he was not allowed to go to the Eastern Bloc countries so the trips to his employers in East Berlin were made in the greatest secrecy. To get into East Berlin, Berling had to go through the Berlin Wall at a special door at Friedrichstraße. It was an ordinary door in the house next to the Friedrichstraße station entrance. His liaison officer went ahead and then Berling could go straight out through a small door and suddenly he found himself in the station on the western side. It was, however, not just the work at the Security Service that gave Bergling the opportunity to conduct espionage. As a Swedish military reservist, he served several times in connection with various military unit exercises all around Sweden. In the autumn of 1975 he was stationed at the top secret coastal artillery battery "OD" (Femöre battery) in Oxelösund which at that time was an important part of the Swedish coastal defence and protection against the Soviet Union in the east. As a high ranking staff officer and head of the Section II of the Defence Staff, Bergling had access to the safe and had the opportunity to look through the documents when he was duty officer by himself.

== Bergling suspected and arrested ==
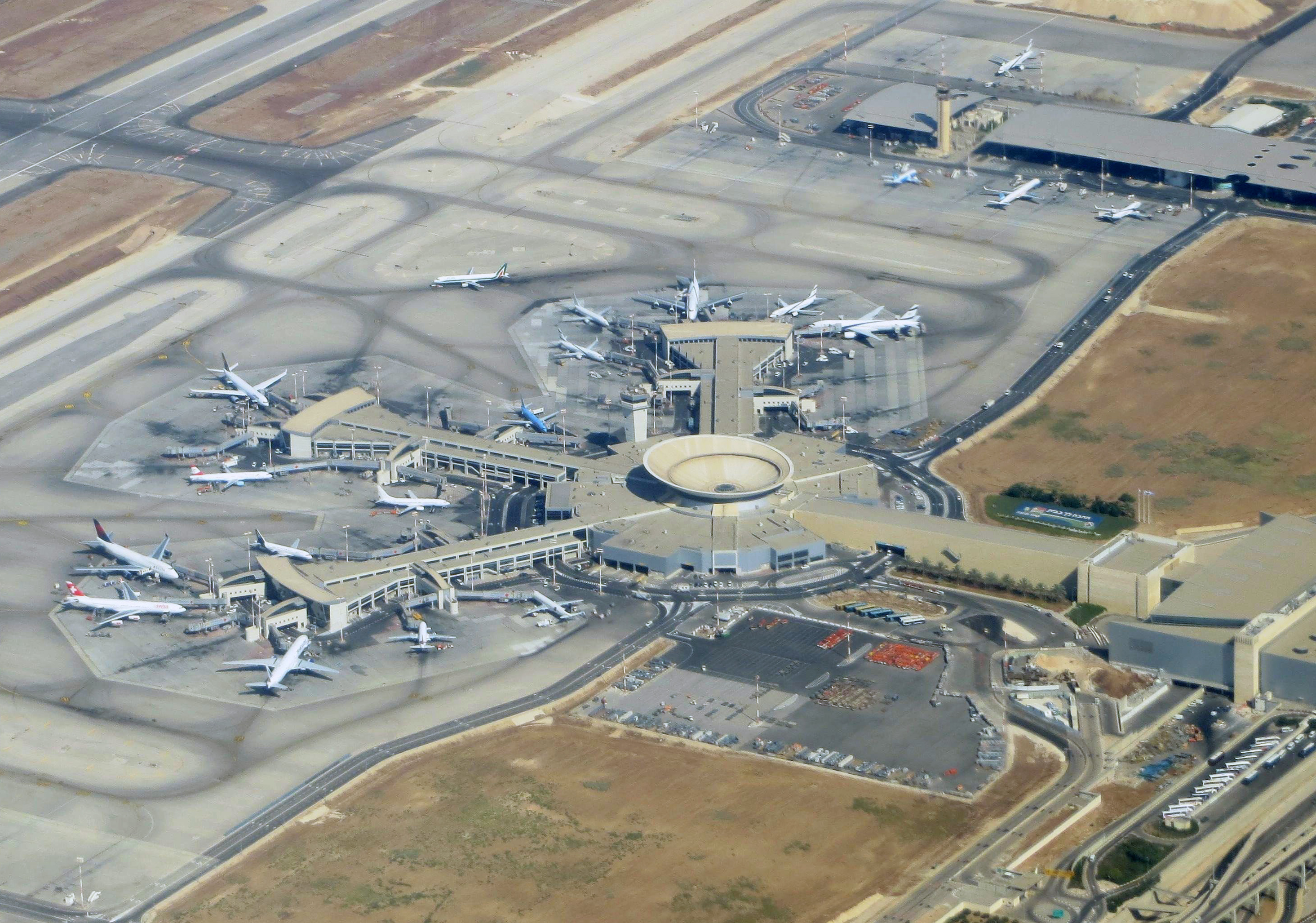
Bergling was arrested on 12 March 1979 at Ben Gurion Airport.

In March 1976, Bergling was placed at the surveillance division at Säpo, and then got a unique insight into the ongoing projects, which had the purpose of exposing the Soviet intelligence officers and to recruit its own Soviet informers. As Bergling increasingly revealed more to his Soviets employers, suspicions also increased at Säpo that something was not right, and that it had a mole in the organization. Bergling soon became a suspect and Säpo began to follow him. At this time, the civilian Soviet secret service KGB also had a mole high up in its own organization; Oleg Gordievsky, who for some years had regularly provided the Western Bloc with information. Through contacts with his military colleagues at the GRU, Gordievsky understood that they had an agent placed in Säpo in Sweden. This information was communicated by Gordyevsky to the west through his regular contacts with the British MI6. Meanwhile, in 1976, Bergling's Swiss fiancee reported him for assault. At the same time she informed about her suspicions that he was a spy. Nothing happened except that police interrogated the woman.

In 1977, Bergling applied for a new UN service and was deployed to Suez. Säpo had then received information regarding Bergling's contacts with an identified GRU officer in the Middle East. Bergling was in Jordan when he decided to fly back to Sweden. However, there were no flights to Sweden from Jordan, so Bergling went to Israel instead. On 12 March 1979, Bergling was arrested by the Israeli counterintelligence and security service Shin Bet at the passport control at Ben Gurion Airport after the Israelis had been informed by Säpo. Säpo believed, however, that they themselves could not arrest him because their information would not have been useful in a Swedish court. At the same time, Säpo bureau chief Olof Frånstedt informed the Israelis that Bergling had intended to return to Israel. The arrest of Bergling occurred therefore independently by Israel, and the reason for this was that Shin Bet needed to find out if Bergling also had conducted espionage on Israeli interests during his time in the Middle East. He got to choose where the interrogations would take place – in a prison or in a luxury hotel. Bergling got half an hour to decide and chose the luxury hotel. After seven days of interrogation, Bergling was put on a flight to Copenhagen where he was met by staff from the Danish secret service. They brought him to Helsingborg where he was met by old colleagues from Säpo and then taken to Stockholm. All in all, Bergling had earned 67,000 SEK on his spying.

== Prosecution, in prison and conjugal visits ==
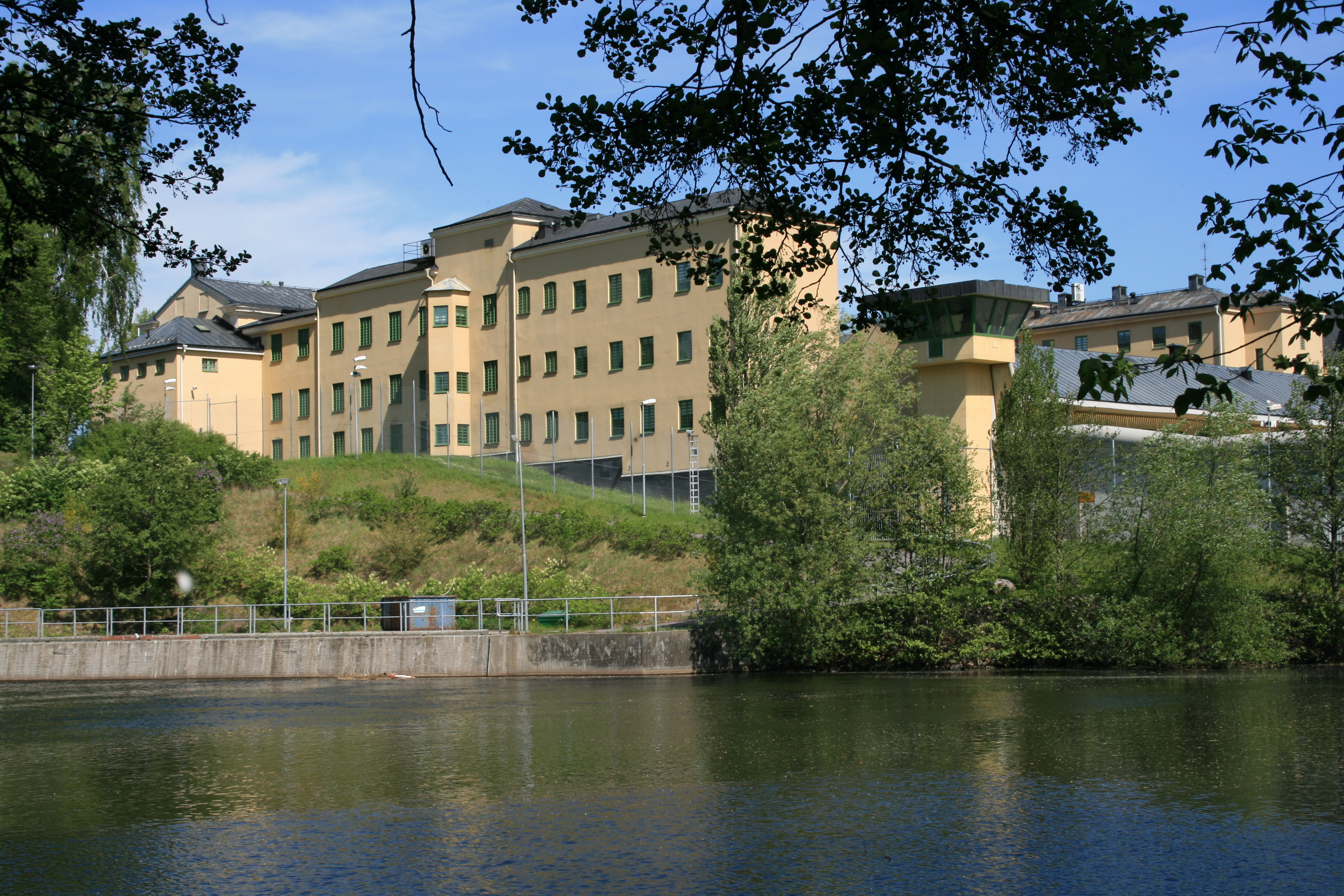
Bergling spent part of his imprisonment in Norrköping Prison.

Bergling was detained in custody in March 1979 and defended by the lawyer Ragnar Gottfarb. On 7 December 1979, he was sentenced in Sweden to life imprisonment for aggravated espionage and aggravated unauthorised dealing with secret information for handing out the fortification code (FO code) – the list of Sweden's defence installations, coastal artillery fortifications and mobilization stores. He was also accused of having handed over the Supreme Commander's war planning of the Soviets – planning on how the Swedish Armed Forces should act at different levels in a war situation. These were documents that had even greater secrecy than the binder that Bergling handed to the Soviets in Beirut. Bergling said that he simply did not know where these documents were and that he would never had the time to copy the documents without being detected. Also, in his defence, Oleg Gordievsky (the Western agent in the KGB) reported to the West that Bergling handed out the fortification code, but never said anything about the Supreme Commander's war planning documents. The Stockholm District Court cleared him of these charges. Bergling's then fiancee was sentenced to three months in prison for accessory to espionage.

After the verdict, Bergling was subjected to, for reasons of national security, a very strict solitary confinement. The then government under Minister for Justice Håkan Winberg decided on 10 January 1980 of certain restrictions for Bergling under the penal law (kriminalvårdslagen). Letters to and from Bergling were reviewed by Säpo and were kept. Visits and phone calls could be banned if they were detrimental to national security. Regulations regarding Bergling's treatment in prison was entrusted to the National Prison and Probation Administration to consult with the National Police Board on the application. It was the National Police Board's Security Department that would account for the safety assessment and determine what considerations of national security demanded in the form of restrictions. On 12 June 1980, Bergling offered himself to be replaced by Raoul Wallenberg, but the Soviet Union did not respond. According to information from there, Wallenberg died in prison in 1947.

Bergling was in solitary confinement for 39 months in Kumla Prison before he ended up in mental health care, first in Karsudden Hospital in Katrineholm and then Västervik Mental Hospital in Västervik in 1982. In 1983, he was not considered to be in need of any additional care and the same year he came to Norrköping Prison. In Norrköping Prison, he had, at an early stage, been given permission to receive visits. A childhood friend, Elisabeth Sandberg, was coming to greet Bergling more often. The relationship developed, and while in prison Bergling change his name to Eugén Sandberg – Sandberg was his mother's maiden name – in connection with the marriage to Elisabeth Sandberg. They married in prison on 1 March 1986, the day after prime minister Olof Palme was murdered. They had resumed their acquaintance through correspondence during his prison time. She was at that time care assistant in the home care services in Spånga, divorced with four children. During the numerous visits in Norrköping and conjugal visits in her residence in Rinkeby the opportunity to plan an escape was given to them.

From the beginning of 1985, Bergling was granted a total of 15 supervised or accompanied conjugal visits. In July 1985, the government rejected Bergling's request for pardon. Six months later his request for repeal of the special restrictions was also rejected. After he, in October 1985 smuggled out a letter, where he told of advanced escape plans, the accompanied conjugal visits were ceased. Until May 1987, he was only admitted supervised conjugal visits. In March 1987, he applied again for pardon and that the special restrictions be lifted. The government rejected the pardon application on August 27. According to the Supreme Commander's opinion, it would take more time before the most important actions to reduce the harmful effects of Bergling espionage were completed. There was also, according to the Supreme Commander, a real risk that Bergling still had knowledge that, if it came to the hands of some foreign power, would bring harm to the national security. Somewhat later the Ministry of Justice remitted the petition to amend the regulation of Bergling to the relevant authorities. On 24 September 1987, the Director General of the National Prison and Probation Administration, Ulf Larsson, submitted a memorandum on Bergling to the Ministry of Justice. He also informed that the National Prison and Probation Administration, in view of the government's rejection of pardon and the reasons for it, opposed easing of the regulations for Bergling. On 24 September, the National Prison and Probation Administration Department Manager Clas Amilon decided, without having been informed of Larsson's consultation response to the Ministry, to grant Bergling a new accompanied conjugal visit with the same arrangement as in July when he visited Gröna Lund in Stockholm – including a restaurant visit. The accompanied conjugal visit that began in the morning of 5 October 1987 was the first after the government's rejection of the pardon in August.

== Escape from prison ==
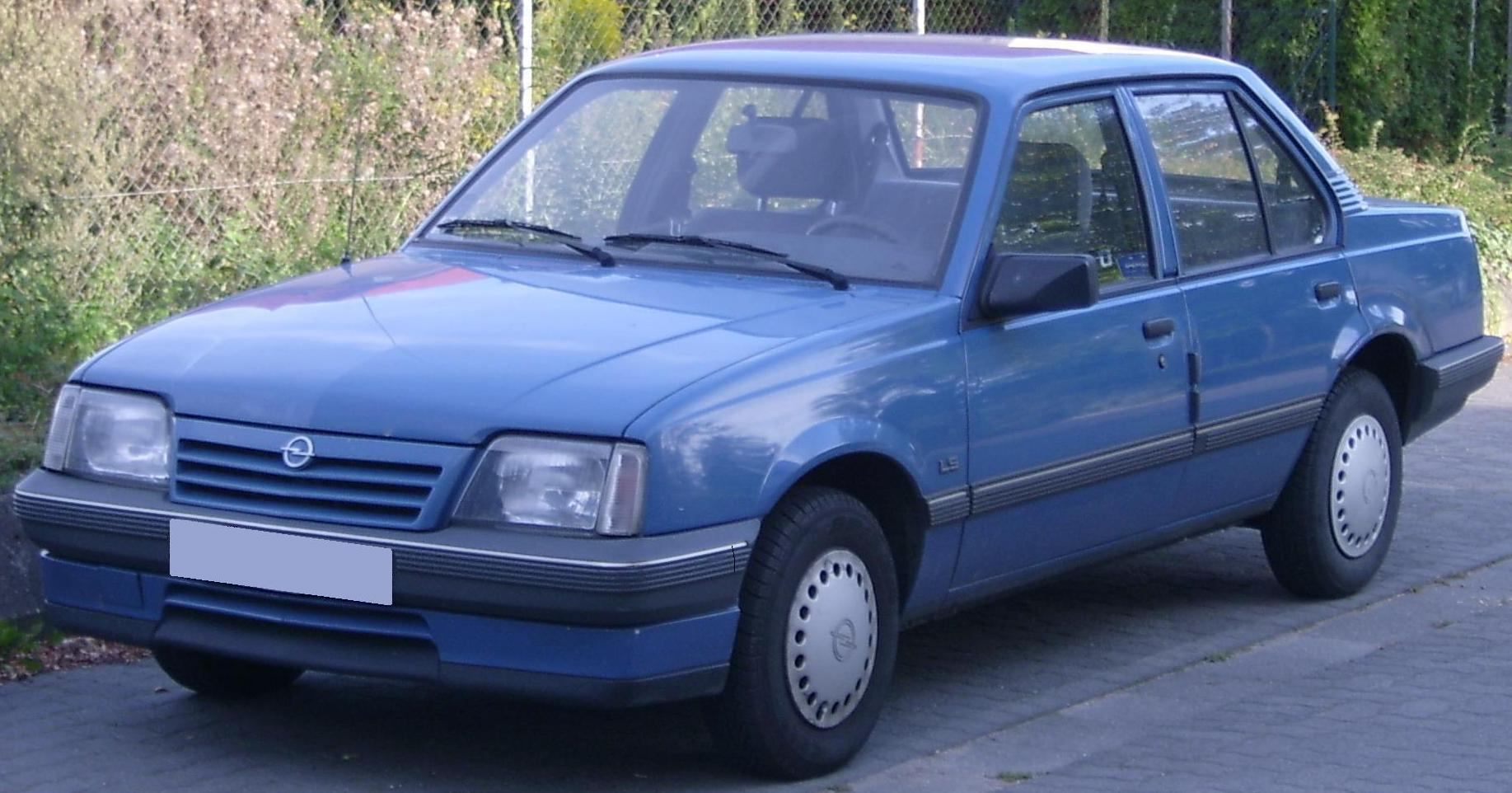
An Opel Ascona was one of the vehicles used during Bergling's prison escape in October, 1987.

On 6 October 1987, while on conjugal visit from Norrköping Prison, he and his wife, Elisabeth, managed to escape. Bergling had been planning the escape from prison for three years. On Monday morning, 5 October, Bergling left prison on a conjugal visit with a prison overseer. They had met his wife during the day and later in the evening, all three had eaten dinner together at restaurant Stallmästaregården. The prison overseer had left the couple in his wife's apartment in Rinkeby at about 23:00 in the evening and would return 13:00 the day after. The only surveillance Bergling had was Säpo's surveillance team in a car in front of the house. The wife had arranged three rental cars that would serve as escape vehicles. The first one was parked in front of the house to attract the surveillance team. At midnight, he put plans into action. First, his wife left the apartment disguised and passed Säpo's surveillance car. Then, Bergling went down into the garage of the house dressed in jogger outfit and went out of the gate. There was a fog and the surveillance team could not see him.

The plan now was to meet at the second escape vehicle, which was in a parking lot in Rinkeby, one kilometer away. Before he could reach the second car, Säpo's surveillance car had stopped behind it because it checked on all the cars in the area. His wife went off to get to the third escape vehicle parked in Djursholm. Bergling ran over Järvafältet towards Tensta and reached E18, where he found a vacant taxi. He ordered the taxi to Djursholms Ösby and ran from there the last bit to Djursholm square. He met up, as planned, with his wife Elisabeth at the third escape vehicle, an Opel Ascona, which had been parked just 50 meters from where the previously convicted spy Stig Wennerström lived.

From Djursholm they made their way further north to Grisslehamn where Ålandsfärjan departed at 09.00. They made their way through Eckerö in Åland to the Soviet Consulate in Mariehamn, where they arrived at 13:00, at the same time as the prison overseer knocked on the door of the apartment in Rinkeby. From here the couple were instructed to take the ferry to Naantali in to mainland Finland and on to the Soviet Embassy in Helsinki. They stayed there for a week. In the suburb area of Tapiola in Espoo, the police found the couple's escape vehicle. It took more than 10 hours before the Swedish authorities issued an official alert for Bergling. Bergling was now transported in the trunk of a diplomatic car 200 kilometres (120 mi) to the Finnish–Soviet border crossing station Vaalimaa and his old clients.

The Government Offices were informed of Bergling's escape during the afternoon of 6 October 1987, by a telephone message from Director General of the National Prison and Probation Administration to the Minister of Justice Sten Wickbom. Approximately at 16:00 the Justice Minister had spoken to the Director General, and half an hour later with Per-Göran Näss, the director of the police security department. The Justice Minister and his colleagues was, throughout the night of Wednesday, until at 05:30 in the morning, working in the department. They had regular contact with Säpo. At his first contact with the security department at 16:30, the Justice Minister Wickbom asked if the official alert (rikslarm) had been issued and got the answer that no such alert had been issued, but it would immediately be. The official alert was first issued at 22:14, nearly 24 hours after the prison overseer had left the couple in the apartment in Rinkeby.

== Political consequences ==
On 8 October 1987, the Government decided to assign the Chancellor of Justice Hans Stark to the task of investigating the circumstances surrounding the conjugal visit Bergling had been granted, the security that had occurred and responsibilities associated with it and the responsible authorities' actions during the time of his dissenting. On 19 October 1987, the Chancellor of Justice reported his assessment. The National Police Board's security department and staff could not be responsible for the deviation but instead the National Prison and Probation Administration's client department. Concerning the subsequent handling of the issue regarding the notification of the fugitive once it was clear that Bergling has fled, the Chancellor of Justice meant that the "arrest warrant and the official alert was delayed in an unacceptable manner" and that the responsibility for this lay with the officers at Norrköping Police Department.

Justice Minister Wickbom was forced to resign after Bergling's escape. Wickbom had claimed that he had not been informed that Bergling had been granted regular conjugal visits and that his escape was a result of a series of mix-ups between the police and the prison service. The information about Bergling's conjugal visit was at the Department of Justice at the time of the escape, though he had not seen it. Prime Minister Ingvar Carlsson said he accepted Wickboms departure, but praised his courage in his decision to resign. On 20 October 1987 the Director General of the National Prison and Probation Administration Ulf Larsson, the State Secretary Harald Fälth, the Information Officer at the Ministry of Justice Björn Fougelberg and the political adviser to the former minister Pär Nuder all resigned.

== Time abroad and the return to Sweden ==
Under the alias of Ivar and Elisabeth Straus, they lived in Moscow for a while. From the start, the Soviets did not trust Bergling suspecting him as a Säpo (double) agent. The escape had been too easy and the GRU thought it was prearranged. Again and again Bergling has to show how Elisabeth's house looked like and how they could run away from Säpo. Because of the questions the Soviets asked after they arrived in Moscow, he understood that there would be no intelligence work in for him. Bergling received 500 rubles per month, which was more than most senior Soviet state and party officials earned.

1988-89 they lived in the Hungarian capital Budapest before they moved back to Moscow. However, in autumn of 1990, as the Soviet Union was collapsing, they were moved to Lebanon. There, Bergling was active under the name of Ronald Abi and pretended to be a British agricultural engineer while he worked as a security consultant for Walid Jumblatt at the end of the civil war. Jumblatt was head of the Progressive Socialist Party, a Druze-based party and ally of the Soviet Union. He first lived in Jumblatt's home in Moukhtara in the Chouf Mountains before he got his own house. In Lebanon, Bergling got 5,000 dollars every six months, they lived rent free, got cars almost for free and they got pocket money from Jumblatt himself. Jumblatt later apologized to Sweden for having protected a convicted spy for four years but had done so at the request of his former friends in the Soviet Communist Party.

On 2 August 1994, Bergling called the Säpo from Cyprus. He was then ill with Parkinson's disease, his wife had cancer and longed for her children. They wanted to go home to Sweden. When Bergling said who he was, he was at first not believed. After a few checks Säpo realised that it actually was Bergling. The day after the couple returned voluntarily to Sweden and Bergling was arrested at Stockholm Arlanda Airport. On returning home, Bergling's own mother didn't know if he was alive. Bergling spent three years in prison until his release for health reasons on 17 July 1997. The final time in Asptuna Prison. The last time at Asptuna Prison he spent in his room because he was ostracised and bullied by other prisoners. On one occasion he was attacked and stabbed by a fellow prisoner who thought he disturbed him when he was cleaning. Bergling received a blow over the ear, but no serious injuries. During the end of the prison term, his then wife became acutely ill with chronic cancer. Bergling did not get to the hospital in time, before she died on their wedding day. The following year, Bergling married the psychologist Elisabeth Robertson, 20 years his junior.

== Later life and death ==
On 8 October 2003, Bergling met for the first time before an audience Tore Forsberg, the former head of the Swedish counterintelligence, in a meeting in Akademiska Föreningen's premises in Lund.

In the middle of 2006, Bergling became a member of the Swedish Left Party, but he later left the party in September the same year, disappointed at the outcome of the elections according to Aftonbladet. In 2008 Bergling pronounced in media his support for the FRA law.

In 1992 he was diagnosed with Parkinson's disease and moved around, at the end of his life, using a wheelchair or a mobility scooter. In 2004 he divorced a Polish woman whom he had been married to twice. Bergling had an adult son which his ex-wife's new husband adopted. The son was adopted when he was a year and a half old. Bergling lived from October 2012 in Stockholm Nursing Home.

In March 2013 Bergling was suspected to have shot a nurse in the face with an airsoft gun. The incident occurred when the nurse was in Bergling's room to help him with some practical details. According to Bergling himself, he had felt provoked by the keeper and then brought up an airsoft gun and fired the gun into the wall. The police investigation was later discontinued and Bergling's airsoft gun, which had been seized by the police, was returned. Bergling died from Parkinson's disease on 24 January 2015. He was buried on 7 May 2015 at Kungsholms Cemetery in Kungsholmen, Stockholm.

== Personal life ==
In his first marriage, Bergling was married 1961–1965 to Marianne Rinman (1941–2009), daughter of diploma engineer Kurt Rinman. In his second marriage, from 1965 to 1973, he was married to Kyllikki Kyyrö (born 1934); in his third, he was married in 1986 to Elisabeth Sjögren (also named Lillemor Geuken and Elisabeth Sandberg) (1940–1997); and in his fourth (from 1998 to 2002) and fifth (from 2003 to 2004), to psychologist Helena Smejko (also named Elisabeth Robertsson) (born 1955), a native of Poland.

== Enemy's Enemy ==
In the novel Enemy's Enemy (1989) by author Jan Guillou, Carl Hamilton gets the task from his clients to go to Moscow and kill the spy Stig Bergling (in the book called Stig Sandström) who has escaped during his conjugal visit, killed his wife and went to Moscow to work for the Russians. The surname Sandström was taken from Sune Sandström, the then head of Säpo. Bergling wasn't murdered or killed his wife, but later returned to Sweden to serve the remainder of his sentence for espionage. In the 2006 edition of Enemy's Enemy, Guillou writes:

"One morning he [Bergling] phoned me from Hall Prison and woke me up. He felt that he was entitled to a dedicated copy of the book. I could only agree and wrote truthfully that this is the most remarkable dedication I have ever written. One must say that I got off cheaply."

== Bibliography ==
- Bergling, Stig; Cras, Bengt-Åke; Thornberg, Jörgen (1996). Aldrig mera fri [Never again free] (in Swedish). Stavsnäs: Mirabelle. ISBN 91-972910-1-3.
