= Data Act =

Data Act may refer to:

- Data Act (European Union), 2021
- Data Act (Sweden), 1973
- Digital Accountability and Transparency Act of 2014, U.S.
