= Her Life and Times =

Her Life and Times may refer to:

- Barbie: Her Life and Times, a 1987 book about the Barbie doll by BillyBoy*
- Eva Braun: Her Life and Times: 1912–1945, a 2018 biography by Thomas C. Lundmark
- Louie Bennett, Her Life and Times, a 1957 post-humus autobiographical memoir by R.M. Fox adapted from her recollections
- Viola Desmond: Her Life and Times, an autobiography
- Kathleen Kennedy: Her Life and Times, a 1983 biography by Lynne McTaggart about Kathleen Cavendish, Marchioness of Hartington
- “Hildreth Meière: Her Life and Times (Not Hard)", a 1955 autobiographical essay

== See also ==
- Life and Times (disambiguation)
