= 1334 Lundmarka =

Main-belt asteroid

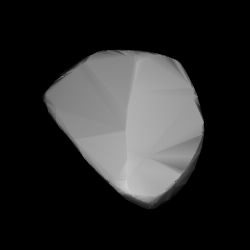
- Shape model of Lundmarka from its lightcurve

Discovery
- Discovered by: K. Reinmuth
- Discovery site: Heidelberg Obs.
- Discovery date: 16 July 1934

Designations
- Named after: Knut Lundmark (astronomer)
- Alternative designations: 1934 OB
- Minor planet category: main-belt · (outer)

Orbital characteristics
- Epoch 4 September 2017 (JD 2458000.5)
- Uncertainty parameter 0
- Observation arc: 82.89 yr (30,274 days)
- Aphelion: 3.1912 AU
- Perihelion: 2.6376 AU
- Semi-major axis: 2.9144 AU
- Eccentricity: 0.0950
- Orbital period (sidereal): 4.98 yr (1,817 days)
- Mean anomaly: 286.14°
- Mean motion: 0° 11^{m} 53.16^{s} / day
- Inclination: 11.453°
- Longitude of ascending node: 133.23°
- Argument of perihelion: 129.65°

Physical characteristics
- Dimensions: 27.62±2.33 km 29.82±3.2 km (IRAS:14); 30.35 km (derived)
- Synodic rotation period: 6.250±0.003 h 6.25033±0.00001 h
- Geometric albedo: 0.0600±0.016 (IRAS:14); 0.1455 (derived); 0.242±0.246
- Spectral type: X · C
- Absolute magnitude (H): 9.95 · 10.3 · 10.4 · 10.71±0.20

1334 Lundmarka, provisional designation 1934 OB, is a carbonaceous asteroid from the outer region of the asteroid belt, approximately 30 kilometers in diameter. It was discovered on 16 July 1934, by German astronomer Karl Reinmuth at Heidelberg Observatory in southern Germany, and named after Swedish astronomer Knut Lundmark.

== Orbit and classification ==
Lundmarka is classified as C-type and X-type asteroid by the LCDB and Pan-STARRS, respectively. It orbits the Sun in the outer main-belt at a distance of 2.6–3.2 AU once every 4 years and 12 months (1,817 days). Its orbit has an eccentricity of 0.10 and an inclination of 11° with respect to the ecliptic. The body's observation arc begins with its official discovery observation at Heidelberg, as no precoveries were taken and no prior identifications were made.

== Rotation period ==
A rotational lightcurve of Lundmarka was obtained from photometric observations made at the Australian Oakley Southern Sky Observatory (E09) in September 2014. The lightcurve gave a rotation period of 6.250±0.003 hours with a brightness variation of 0.70 in magnitude (U=3-).

In March 2016, a second period was published based on data from the Lowell Photometric Database. Using lightcurve inversion and convex shape models, as well as distributed computing power and the help of individual volunteers, a period of 6.25033±0.00001 hours was derived from the database's sparse-in-time photometry data (U=n.a.).

== Diameter and albedo ==
According to the surveys carried out by the Infrared Astronomical Satellite (IRAS) and NASA's Wide-field Infrared Survey Explorer with its subsequent NEOWISE mission, Lundmarka measures 29.8 and 27.6 kilometers in diameter, respectively, and its surface has a corresponding albedo of 0.06 and 0.24. The Collaborative Asteroid Lightcurve Link derives an intermediary albedo of 0.146 and a diameter of 30.4 kilometers.

== Naming ==
This minor planet was named in memory of Swedish astronomer Knut Lundmark (1889–1958), who was the head of the Lund Observatory. He thoroughly analyzed galaxies and globular clusters, and pioneered in measuring galactic distances and absolute stellar magnitudes. Lundmark also appeared in national radio with programs on popular astronomy and the history of science. The official naming citation was mentioned in The Names of the Minor Planets by Paul Herget in 1955 (H 121). The lunar crater Lundmark is also named in his honour.
