= 809 Lundia =

Main-belt asteroid binary

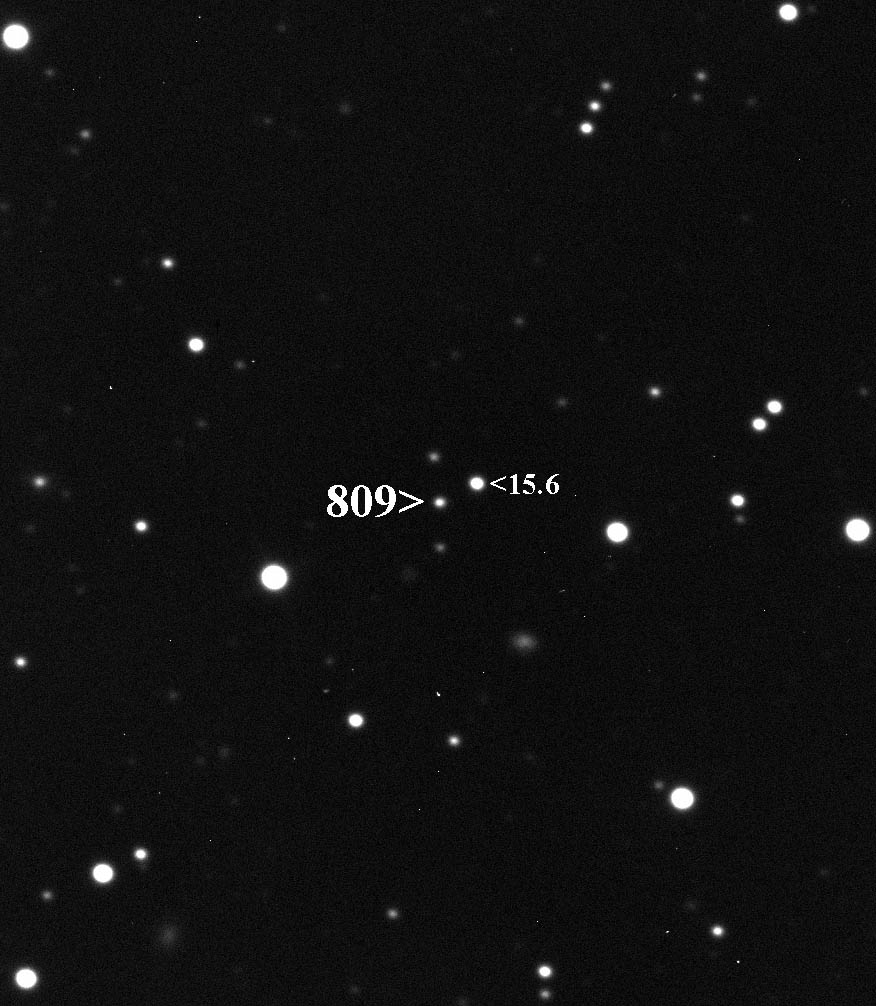
- Asteroid 809 Lundia (apparent magnitude 16.6) near a mag 15.6 star

Discovery
- Discovered by: Max Wolf
- Discovery date: 11 August 1915

Designations
- Pronunciation: /ˈlʌndiə/
- Named after: Lund Observatory
- Alternative designations: 1915 XP; 1936 VC
- Minor planet category: Main belt

Orbital characteristics
- Epoch 31 July 2016 (JD 2457600.5)
- Uncertainty parameter 0
- Observation arc: 100.48 yr (36700 d)
- Aphelion: 2.72316 AU (407.379 Gm)
- Perihelion: 1.84193 AU (275.549 Gm)
- Semi-major axis: 2.28254 AU (341.463 Gm)
- Eccentricity: 0.19304
- Orbital period (sidereal): 3.45 yr (1259.6 d)
- Mean anomaly: 76.7867°
- Mean motion: 0° 17^{m} 8.912^{s} / day
- Inclination: 7.14911°
- Longitude of ascending node: 154.580°
- Argument of perihelion: 196.162°

Physical characteristics
- Dimensions: 10.26 ± 0.07 km
- Mass: (9.27 ± 3.09) × 10^{14} kg
- Mean density: 1.64 ± 0.10 g/cm^{3}
- Synodic rotation period: 15.4142 h (0.64226 d)
- Spectral type: V
- Absolute magnitude (H): 12.2

809 Lundia is a small, binary, V-type asteroid orbiting within the Flora family in the main belt. It is named after Lund Observatory, Sweden.

== Characteristics ==
Lundia orbits within the Flora family. However, its V-type spectrum indicates that it is not genetically related to the Flora family, but rather is probably a fragment (two fragments, if its moon is included) ejected from the surface of 4 Vesta by a large impact in the past. Its orbit lies too far from Vesta for it to actually be a member of the Vesta family. It is not clear how it arrived at an orbit so far from Vesta, but other examples of V-type asteroids orbiting fairly far from their parent body are known. A mechanism of interplay between the Yarkovsky effect and nonlinear secular resonances (primarily involving Jupiter and Saturn) has been proposed.

== Binary system ==
Lightcurve observations in 2005 revealed that Lundia is a binary system of two similarly sized objects orbiting their common centre of gravity. The satellite remains undesignated. The similarity of size between the two components is suspected because during mutual occultations the brightness drops by a similar amount independently of which component is hidden. Due to the similar size of the primary and secondary the Minor Planet Center lists this as a binary companion.

Assuming an albedo similar to 4 Vesta (around 0.4) suggests that the components are about 7 km across. They orbit each other in a period of 15.4 hours, which roughly indicates that the separation between them is very close: to the order of 10–20 km if typical asteroid albedo and density values are assumed.
