= HSwMS Orion (A201) =

Swedish signals intelligence gathering vessel

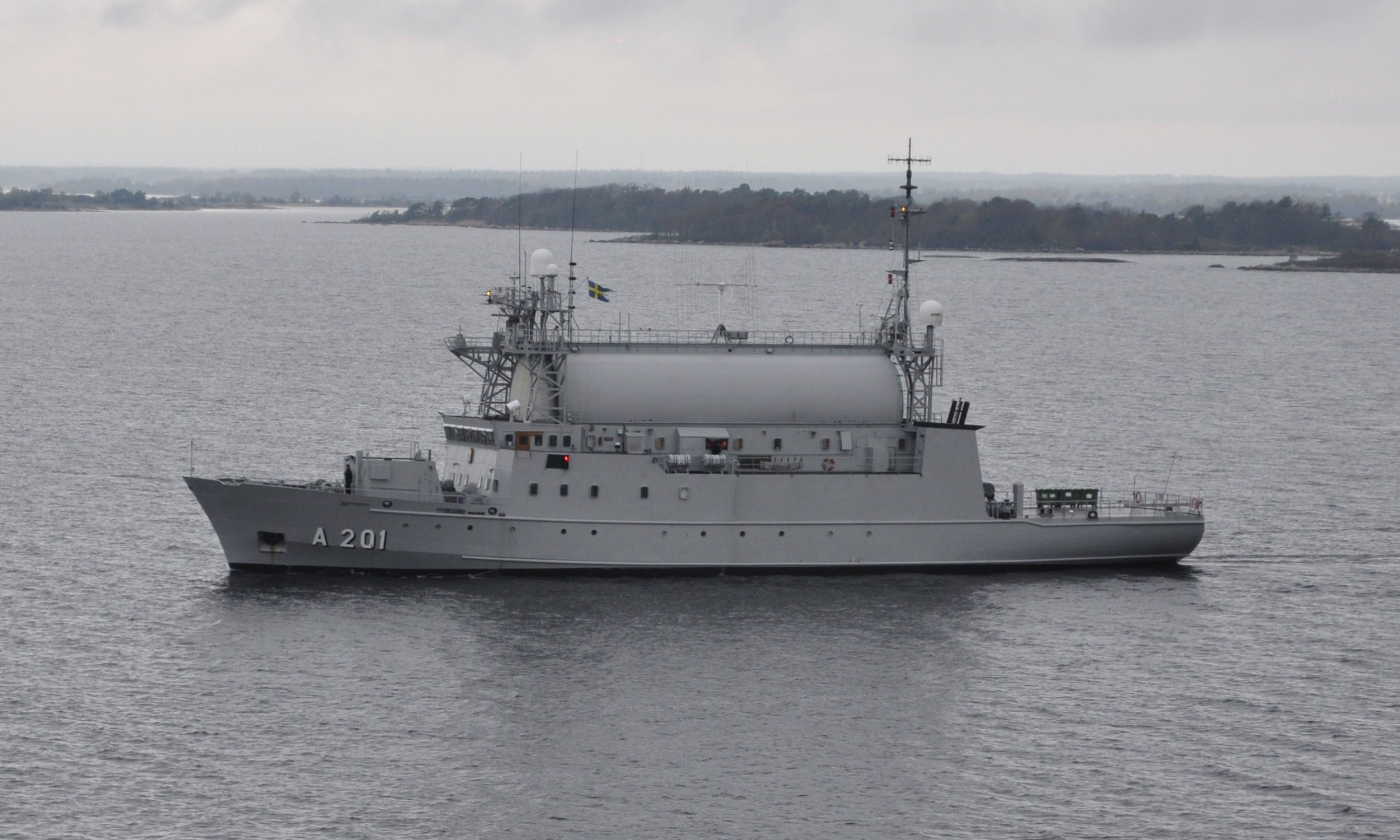
- HSwMS Orion

History

Sweden
- Name: Orion
- Builder: Kockums
- Launched: June 1984
- Home port: Karlskrona
- Identification: Pennant number: A201; MMSI number: 265000000
- Status: In active service

General characteristics
- Type: Signals intelligence gathering vessel
- Displacement: 1,400 tons
- Length: 61.2 m (200 ft 9 in)
- Beam: 11.7 m (38 ft 5 in)
- Draught: 3.8 m (12 ft 6 in)
- Propulsion: 2 x Hedemora diesels
- Speed: 12 knots (22 km/h; 14 mph)
- Complement: 26

HSwMS Orion (A201) is a signals intelligence gathering vessel of the Swedish Navy.

HSwMS Orion was launched in 1984. She was built with extensive support from the United States National Security Agency. In November 1985, HSwMS Orion was rammed by a Soviet minesweeper after she got too close to a Soviet naval exercise. In 1998 Orion received a false bomb threat, which was widely covered in the Swedish newspapers. The ship is operated by Swedish Navy officers and sailors, as well as personnel from the National Defence Radio Establishment (FRA). HSwMS Orion belongs to the 1st Submarine Division. Orion shares a hull design with the Fiskeriverkets vessel Argos, an official fishing control vessel.

== Replacement ==
On 22 April 2010, the government of Sweden approved the acquisition of a new ship to replace HSwMS Orion since it no longer meets current sea safety rules.

On 17 April 2017, a new intelligence ship was ordered, HSwMS Artemis, from the Saab Group. The new ship is to be commissioned by 2020 and has a displacement of 2,200 tons. Construction started on 1 March 2018 at the Polish shipyard Nauta that was selected by Sweden to build the new ship.
