= Crocco (crater) =

Lunar impact crater

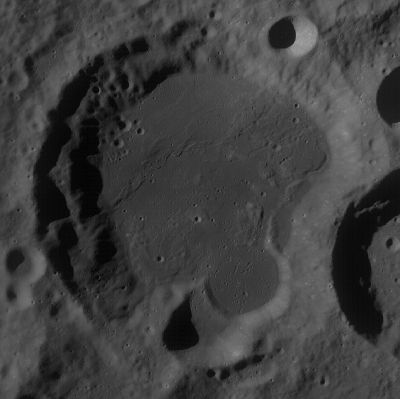
- LRO image
- Coordinates: 47.5°S 150.2°E
- Diameter: 67.50 km (41.94 mi)
- Depth: Unknown
- Colongitude: 211° at sunrise
- Eponym: Gaetano A. Crocco

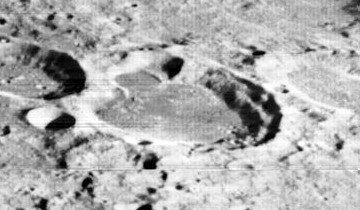
Oblique Lunar Orbiter 2 view, facing south

Crocco is a lunar impact crater that is located on the far side of the Moon from the Earth. It is located to the northeast of the huge walled plain Planck, and northwest of the equally huge Poincaré. Just to the north, within one crater diameter, is the crater Koch.

This is a nearly circular crater formation whose eastern rim has been partly overlain by the satellite crater Crocco G. The rim has received some erosion, but it retains a well-defined edge. A small craterlet lies across the north-northeast rim. Just to the west-southwest of Crocco, nearly attached to the rim, is the satellite crater Crocco R.

The northwestern half of the interior floor is level and almost featureless; displaying the appearance of having been resurfaced by lava. The morphology of this pond suggests two separate flows occurring at different times periods. The opposite half of the floor displays some irregularities, including the rim of a small crater that has been almost completely submerged by the lava flow. This crater has a gap in the north rim, and forms a bay on the interior floor of Crocco. A ridge runs from the western rim of this small crater to the southwest inner wall of Crocco.

This crater is named after Gaetano Arturo Crocco (1877–1968), an Italian scientist and aeronautics pioneer. Its designation was formally adopted by the International Astronomical Union in 1970.

== Satellite craters ==
By convention these features are identified on lunar maps by placing the letter on the side of the crater midpoint that is closest to Crocco.

Crocco	Latitude	Longitude	Diameter
E	46.8° S	152.0° E	17 km
G	47.8° S	152.3° E	42 km
R	48.3° S	147.5° E	57 km
