= His Life and Times =

His Life and Times may refer to:

- Muhammad Ali: His Life and Times, a 1991 biography by Thomas Hauser about boxer Cassius Clay who became Muhammad Ali
- Gorbachev: His Life and Times, a 2017 biography by William Taubman about Mikhail Gorbachev, General Secretary of the Soviet Union
- Lamy of Santa Fe: His Life and Times, a 1975 biography by Paul Horgan about Catholic Archbishop Jean Baptiste Lamy
- Marlborough: His Life and Times, a 1930s multi-volume biography by Winston Churchill about John Churchill, 1st Duke of Marlborough
- Winchell: His Life and Times, a 1975 biography by Herman Klurfeld about Walter Winchell, that was adapted into the 1998 film Winchell
- Art Young: His Life and Times, a 1935 autobiography

== See also ==
- Life and Times (disambiguation)
