= Koch (crater) =

Crater on the Moon

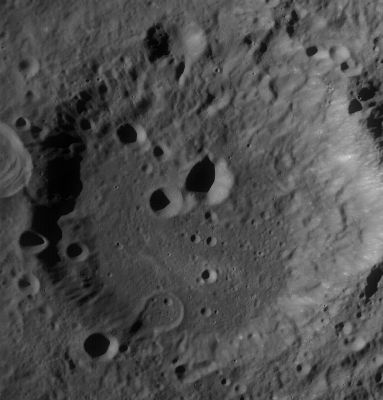
- LRO image
- Coordinates: 42.8°S 150.1°E
- Diameter: 95 km
- Depth: Unknown
- Colongitude: 211° at sunrise
- Eponym: Robert Koch

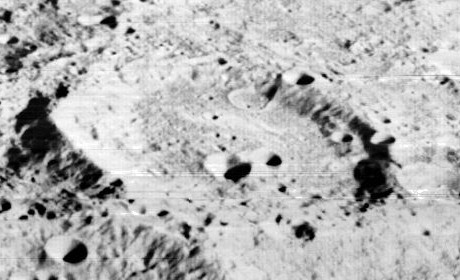
Oblique Lunar Orbiter 2 view, facing south

Koch is a crater on the far side of the Moon. It lies in the southern hemisphere, to the south-southeast of a walled plain named Jules Verne. Attached to the northeastern rim of Koch by a neck of uneven terrain is the crater Lundmark. Less than one crater diameter to the south of Koch is Crocco.

This crater has a worn and eroded outer rim. Several small craters lie along the outer rim, particularly along the northern edge. Attached to the western side is the satellite crater Koch U. The interior floor is also marked by some small craters, with a pair located just to the north of the midpoint and another along the southern inner wall.

== Satellite craters ==
By convention these features are identified on lunar maps by placing the letter on the side of the crater midpoint that is closest to Koch.

Koch	Latitude	Longitude	Diameter
R	44.5° S	146.3° E	20 km
U	42.3° S	147.4° E	25 km
