= HSwMS Artemis =

Swedish signals intelligence gathering vessel

History

Sweden
- Name: Artemis
- Builder: Saab Kockums & Nauta Shipyard
- Laid down: 19 June 2018
- Launched: 17 April 2019
- Christened: 3 April 2024
- Commissioned: 15 November 2023
- Home port: Karlskrona
- Status: In service

General characteristics
- Type: Signals intelligence gathering vessel
- Displacement: 2,200
- Length: 74.6 m (244 ft 9 in)
- Beam: 14.0 m (45 ft 11 in)
- Propulsion: 4 diesel generators, 990 kW (1,330 hp) each
- Complement: 35 cabins, 40 bunks

HSwMS Artemis is a signals intelligence gathering vessel currently in service for the Swedish Navy.

The ship is to replace Sweden's only signals intelligence vessel, HSwMS Orion, which was launched in 1984. Artemis was ordered on 10 April 2017 and was laid down on 19 June 2018 at the Polish shipyard Nauta and the ship was launched on 17 April 2019. The ship is 74 metres (242 ft 9 in) long and it has a displacement of 2,200 tons.

The project was delayed in March 2021 because the Polish shipyard had economic difficulties and was unable to finish the ship. As a result it was towed to Saab Kockums shipyard in Karlskrona, Sweden in February 2022, where construction of the ship was finished with the help of staff from Poland. Artemis was handed over by Saab Kockums to the Swedish defence material administration on 28 April 2023. The outfitting of the ship was performed by the National Defence Radio Establishment and it was commissioned on 15 November 2023.

HSwMS Artemis was christened on 3 April 2024, in Karlskrona. The christening was performed by the Director-General of the National Defence Radio Establishment, Björn Lyrvall.
