= Life and Times =

Life & Times may refer to:

== Music ==
- Life and Times (Jim Croce album), 1973
- Life and Times (Bob Mould album), 2008
- Life and Times 1982–1989 (Family Brown album), 1989
- Life & Times (Billy Cobham album), 1976
- The Life and Times, an American alternative rock band from Kansas City

== Other uses ==
- Life & Times (TV series), a public affairs television program on KCET
- Life and Times (TV series), a documentary series on CBC Television
- Life + Times, the website of Jay-Z

== See also ==
- My Life and Times, 1991 U.S TV show
- His Life and Times, a list of biographies
- Her Life and Times, a list of biographies
- Time-Life Inc.
