= Jules Verne (crater) =

Lunar impact crater

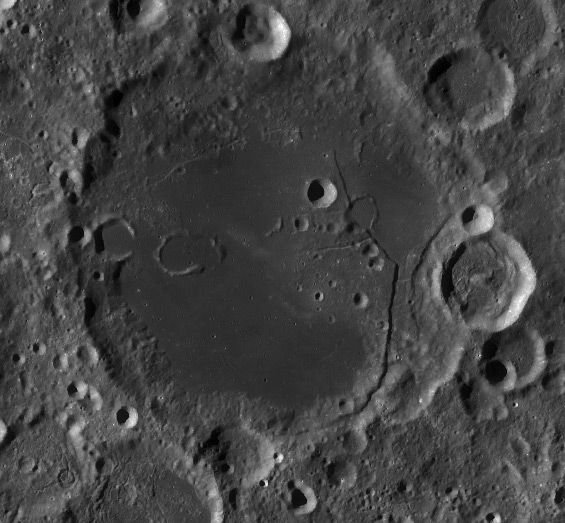
- LRO image of Jules Verne crater
- Coordinates: 35.0°S 147.0°E
- Diameter: 143 km
- Depth: Unknown
- Colongitude: 215° at sunrise
- Eponym: Jules Verne

Jules Verne is a large lunar impact crater on the far side of the Moon, named after the French author. It is located to the west-southwest of the Mare Ingenii, one of the few lunar mares on the far side. To the southeast of Jules Verne is the crater Lundmark, while Koch is located to the south-southeast. To the northwest is Pavlov, a large walled plain.

Most of the interior floor of this crater has been flooded with basaltic lava, leaving a dark, low-albedo surface that is relatively level and flat. It is somewhat unusual for a crater feature on the far side to be flooded with lava, as the crust is generally thicker than on the near side. The crater is located in the outer rim of the South Pole-Aitken basin.

The outer rim of Jules Verne is worn and eroded, with several craters lying across the edge. Along the eastern edge lies Jules Verne G, while Jules Verne C penetrates the northeastern rim and Jules Verne Z cuts across the northern rim. A small crater also lies across the southern rim, while Jules Verne P is attached to the exterior along the south-southwest.

Jules Verne is one of the few lunar craters that is known by a person's full name rather than the surname. It is also named for a science-fiction author rather than a noted scientist or explorer, as is typical. (But see H. G. Wells.)

== Satellite craters ==
By convention, these features are identified on lunar maps by placing the letter on the side of the crater midpoint that is closest to Jules Verne.

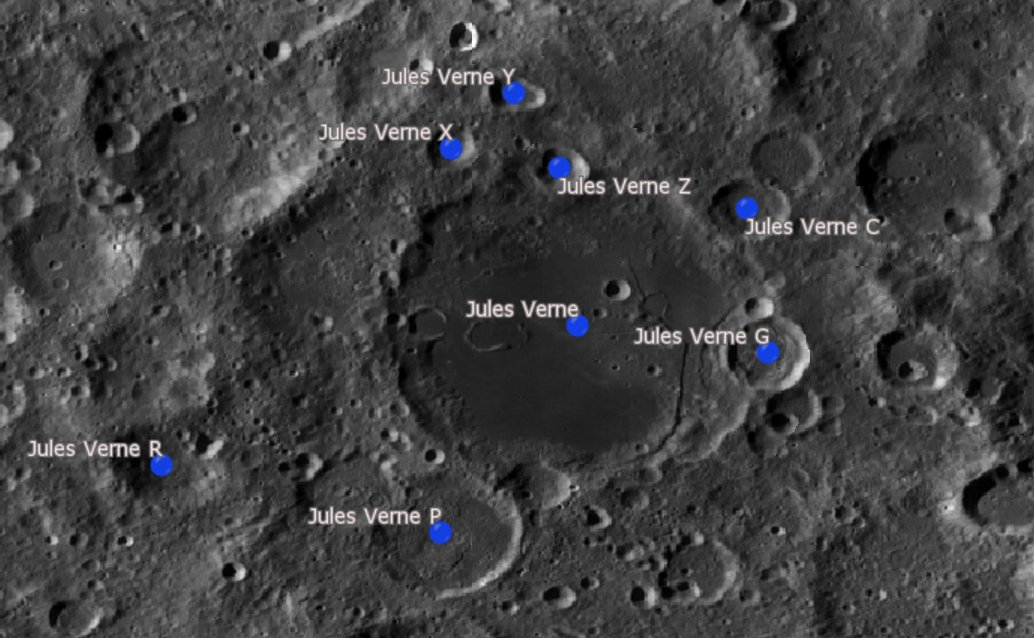
Jules Verne satellite craters

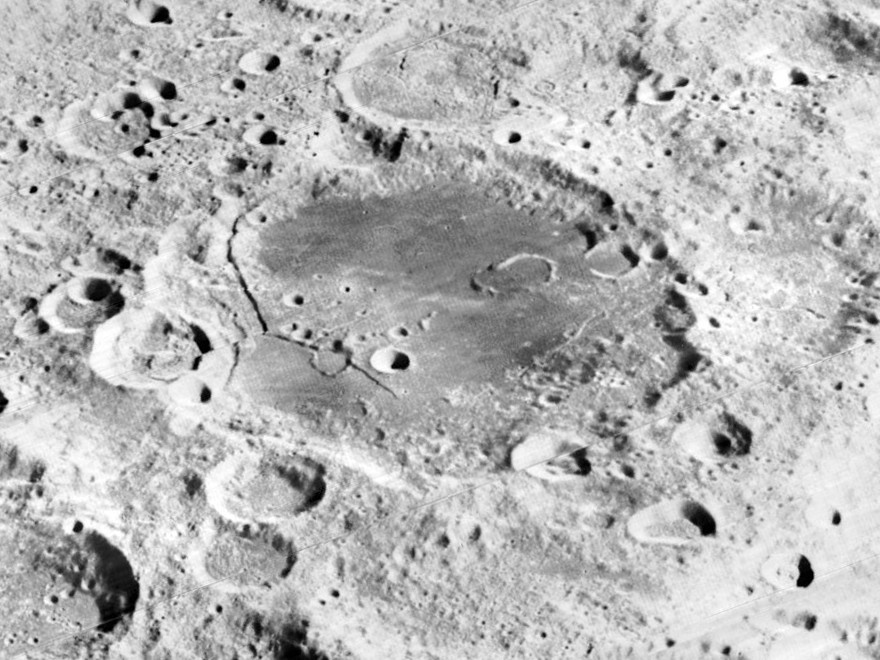
Oblique Lunar Orbiter 2 image of Jules Verne, facing south

Jules Verne	Latitude	Longitude	Diameter
C	33.2° S	149.7° E	30 km
G	35.1° S	150.0° E	42 km
P	38.0° S	145.1° E	62 km
R	36.9° S	140.9° E	49 km
X	32.1° S	145.2° E	15 km
Y	31.3° S	146.0° E	30 km
Z	32.5° S	146.8° E	20 km
