= Bengt Wallroth =

Swedish Army officer

- Born: Bengt Johan Wallroth; 1 April 1931; Kristianstad, Sweden
- Died: 4 February 2005 (aged 73)
- Military career
- Branch: Swedish Army
- Service years: 1953–1984
- Rank: Major general
- Unit: Defence Staff (1965–84)
- Other work: Director-General of the National Defence Radio Establishment

Major General Bengt Johan Wallroth (1 April 1931 – 4 February 2005) was a Swedish Army officer, military intelligence officer and civil servant. He was Director-General of the National Defence Radio Establishment from 1989 to 1994.

== Early life ==
Wallroth was born on 1 April 1931 in Kristianstad, Sweden, the son of Stig Wallroth, an accountant of the Swedish National Bank, and his wife Iris (née Hagman). He passed his studentexamen in 1950 and attended the Royal Military Academy in 1953.

== Career ==
Wallroth was commissioned as an officer in the Jämtland Ranger Regiment (I 5) in 1953 with the rank of second lieutenant. He then attended the Military Academy from 1960 to 1962 and was promoted to captain in the General Staff Corps in 1965. Wallroth served in the Defence Staff from 1965 to 1984, with a break for troop service in Dalarna Regiment (I 13) from 1969 to 1970, in Svea Life Guards (I 1) from 1975 to 1977 and in Älvsborg Regiment (I 15) from 1977 to 1978.

Wallroth's career within the Swedish intelligence started in 1971. He attended the Swedish Defence University in 1975 and was promoted to colonel in 1977 and senior colonel in 1978. Wallroth was head of the combined military intelligence and security service, as the Chief of Defence Staff's Operation Section 5 (Chef Försvarsstabens operationssektion 5, CFst/Op5) from 1978 to 1982. He was appointed acting head of the Joint Operations Command (Operationsledningen, OPL) in 1982 and was promoted to major general in 1984 and was head of the International Division at the Ministry of Defence from 1984 to 1989. The Cold War and the Swedish submarine incidents occupies a large part of everyday life, as well as Sweden's increased international commitments, including the United Nations peacekeeping forces. Wallroth was director-general and head of the National Defence Radio Establishment from 1989 to 1994, the dramatic years when the Warsaw Pact dissolved, the Soviet Union collapsed and the Soviet withdrew from the Baltics.

In the 1990s, he participated in two important investigations. He was chief secretary of the Submarine Commission (1995), which had the task to evaluate and analyze the indications of underwater violations and the submarine precautions that had occurred since 1980. The second investigation, the Intelligence Committee (1996), had the task of reviewing intelligence service tasks, management and design. Wallroth gained through his extensive experience of the Swedish intelligence service and its sharp analytical skills, as an expert in the committee a great influence on the committee's work. After retiring in 1994, Wallroth studied history and political science at the Stockholm University, resulting in a bachelor's degree.

== Other work ==
Wallroth was member of the board of ABAB and he became a member of the Royal Swedish Academy of War Sciences in 1986. He was expert in the Military Responsibilities Committee (Militäransvarskommittén) from 1976 to 1982.

== Personal life ==
In 1956, Wallroth married Kerstin Hansen (1931–2011), the daughter of the civilekonom Gunnar Hansen and Ebba (née Nordgren).

== Death ==
Wallroth died on 4 February 2005 and was buried at the cemetery Silverdals griftegård in Sollentuna Municipality.

== Dates of rank ==
- 1953 – Second lieutenant
- 19?? – Lieutenant
- 1965 – Captain
- 19?? – Major
- 19?? – Lieutenant colonel
- 1977 – Colonel
- 1978 – Senior colonel
- 1984 – Major general

== Awards and decorations ==
- (Sweden) Knight 1st Class of the Order of the Sword (5 June 1971)

Government offices
Preceded by Pär Kettis	Director-General of National Defence Radio Establishment; 1989–1994	Succeeded by Per Kjellnäs
