= Swedish Authority for Privacy Protection =

- Integritetsskyddsmyndigheten
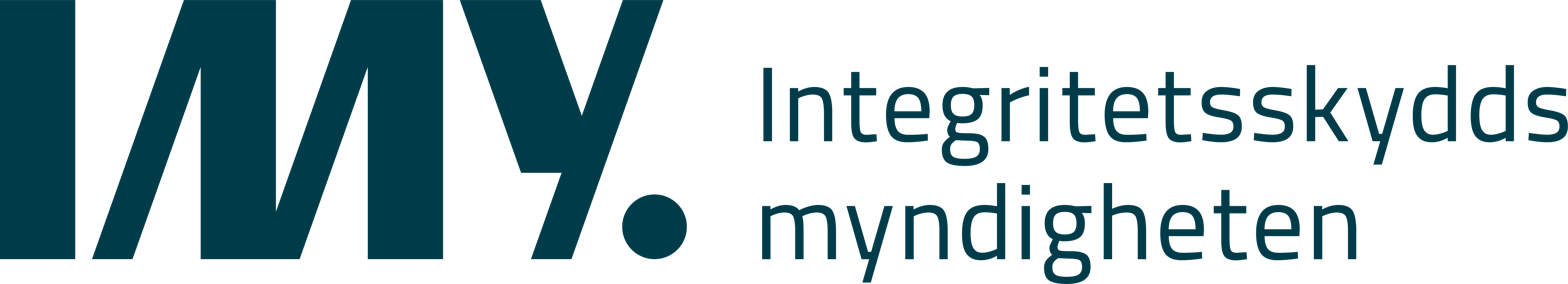

Agency overview
- Formed: 1973
- Minister responsible: Gunnar Strömmer, Minister for Justice
- Agency executive: Kristina Svahn Starrsjö, Director General
- Parent department: Ministry of Justice
- Website: www.imy.se/other-lang/in-english/

The Swedish Authority for Privacy Protection (Swedish: Integritetsskyddsmyndigheten), IMY, formerly the Swedish Data Protection Authority (Swedish: Datainspektionen), is a Swedish government agency, organized under the Ministry of Justice, tasked to protect the individual's privacy in the information society without unnecessarily preventing or complicating the use of new technology. The agency ensure legislation within this area is complied with and as such supervise different registers and carry out inspections of companies, organizations and other government agencies; led by the agency's own IT security specialists and legal advisors. The most important legislation is the Personal Data Act of 1998, the Debt Recovery Act of 1974 and the Credit Information Act of 1973. The agency also has an expert advisory role when the Government prepares new statutory provisions.

== History ==
The Swedish Data Protection Authority was established in 1973, as a result of public concern about personal data and abuse of government power related to mass surveillance and the enactment of the world's first national data protection law: the Data Act.

On 1 January 2021, the agency was renamed to the Swedish Authority for Privacy Protection.

== International co-operation ==
The board is tasked to supervise the Schengen Information System, and is involved in a number of international groups that work on privacy and personal data issues; for instance EU's data protection group and the supervisory function of Europol's data system.

== Organization ==
The agency is based in Stockholm and is led by director-general Kristina Svahn Starrsjö. It has approximately 40 employees, the majority of whom are lawyers. The agency also has a call center that receive on average 200 calls and 60-70 e-mails per week, mostly relating to topical questions regarding protection of privacy.

== See also ==
- Ministry of Justice (Sweden)

== See also ==
- Information privacy
- National data protection authorities
