= Lundmark (crater) =

Crater on the Moon

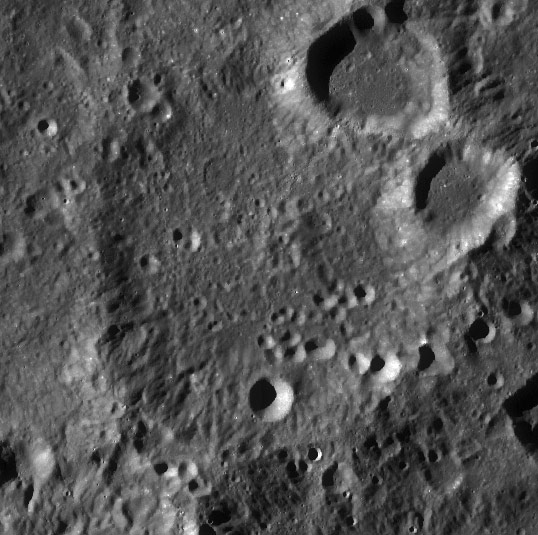
- LRO image
- Coordinates: 39.7°S 152.5°E
- Diameter: 106 km
- Depth: unknown
- Colongitude: 209° at sunrise
- Formation: Pre-Nectarian
- Eponym: Knut Lundmark

Lundmark is an eroded crater on the far side of the Moon. It lies to the southwest of the Mare Ingenii, one of the rare mare areas on the far side. Nearly attached to the southwestern outer rim of Lundmark is the crater Koch, and located to the northwest is the flooded Jules Verne.

On the lunar geologic timescale, Lundmark dates to the Pre-Nectarian period. It is a heavily worn and damaged crater formation that is marked by a number of smaller craters along the sides and interior. The satellite crater Lundmark B overlies the north-northeastern rim, and Lundmark D lies across the eastern rim. There is a cluster of several small craterlets in the southeastern interior floor, and another grouping of craters in the uneven terrain between Lundmark and Koch.

== Satellite craters ==
By convention these features are identified on lunar maps by placing the letter on the side of the crater midpoint that is closest to Lundmark.

Lundmark	Latitude	Longitude	Diameter
B	37.7° S	153.2° E	30 km
C	35.8° S	155.6° E	25 km
D	38.8° S	154.3° E	29 km
F	39.4° S	157.2° E	26 km
G	40.5° S	155.5° E	35 km

== See also ==
- 1334 Lundmarka, main-belt asteroid
