= Torgil Thorén =

First chief of the head of Swedish Radio Intelligence

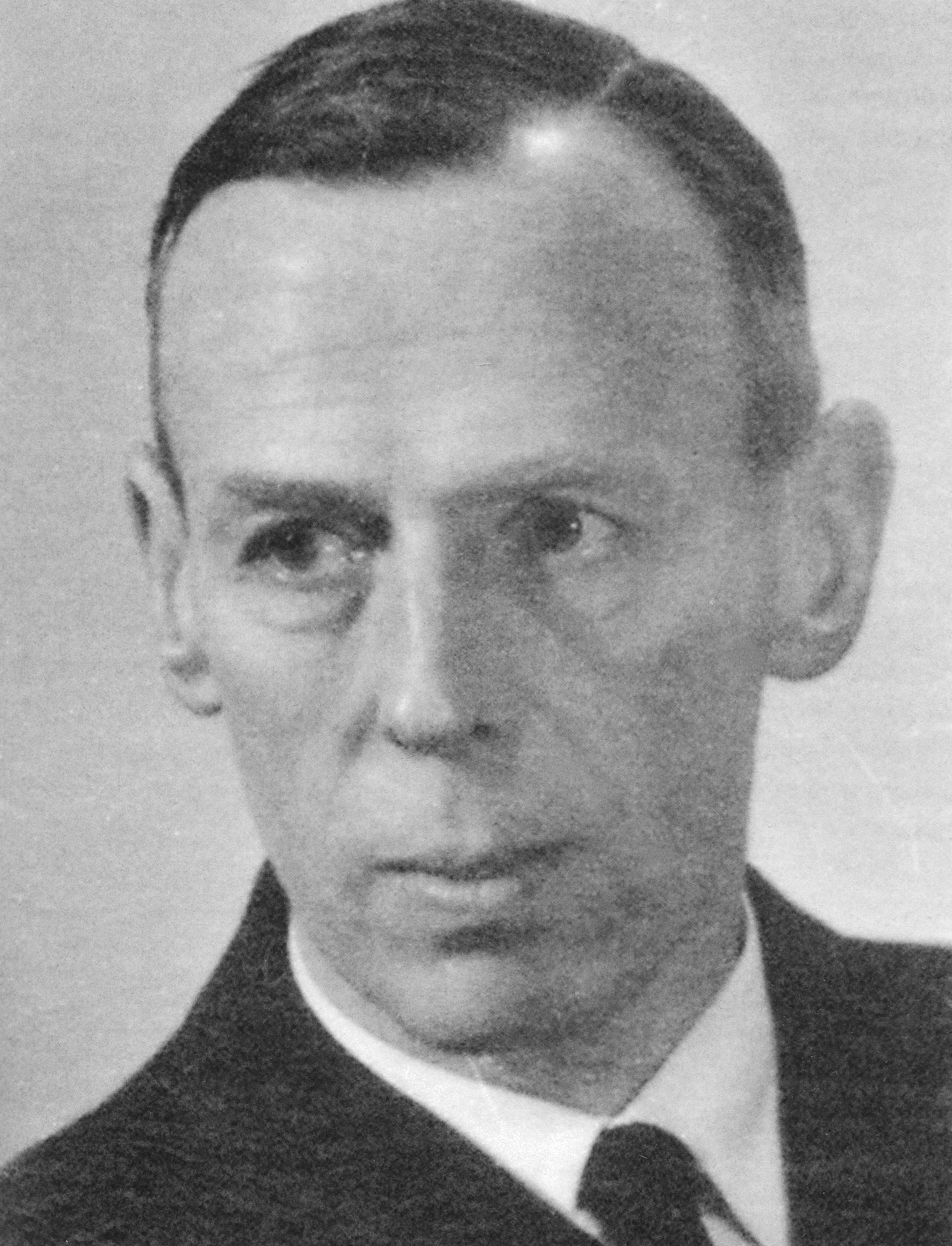
- Born: Torgil Vilhelm Hildebad Thorén; 30 March 1892; Döderhult, Sweden
- Died: 11 March 1982 (aged 89)
- Military career
- Allegiance: Swedish Armed Forces
- Branch: Swedish Navy
- Service years: 1912–1957
- Rank: Captain
- Other work: DG of National Defence Radio Establishment

Captain Torgil Vilhelm Hildebad Thorén (30 March 1892 – 11 March 1982) was a Swedish Navy officer. Thorén was the first Director-General of the National Defence Radio Establishment (FRA).

== Early life ==
Thorén was born on 30 March 1892 in Döderhult, Sweden, the son of medical doctor Adolf Thorén and his wife Anna (née Björck).

== Career ==
Thorén was commissioned as an officer in the Swedish Navy with the rank of underlöjtnant in 1912. He was promoted to sub-lieutenant in 1916, lieutenant in 1922, lieutenant commander in 1937, and to commander in 1939. In 1942 he was appointed captain.

He studied at the Royal Swedish Naval Staff College from 1919 to 1920, and then attended the torpedo course there. In 1922-1935, Thorén was a torpedo boat and destroyer captain. After that, he received a position as division commander in the Destroyer Division (Jagardivisionen), but before World War II erupted as head of department at the Naval Staff and, subsequently, at the Defence Staff (1938-1942). In 1942, he ended up at the National Defence Radio Establishment (FRA) as its first chief, he became the chief executive officer and head in 1952, until retirement in 1957.

His relationship with the Finnish intelligence was the key to Operation Stella Polaris.

He wrote about his time at the FRA in 1945.

== Personal life ==
In 1920, he married Ingrid Mathiesen (born 1899), the daughter of Halfdan Mathiesen and Olga Breien. They had two children; Rolf (born 1922) and Gösta (born 1924).

He died 11 March 1982.

== Dates of rank ==
- 1912 – Underlöjtnant
- 1916 – Sub-lieutenant
- 1922 – Lieutenant
- 1937 – Lieutenant commander
- 1939 – Commander
- 1942 – Captain

== Awards and decorations ==
=== Swedish ===
- (Sweden) Commander 1st Class of the Order of the Sword (6 June 1963)
- (Sweden) Knight of the Order of the Polar Star
- (Sweden) Knight of the Order of Vasa
- (Sweden) RGM
- (Sweden) KSHstorpk

=== Foreign ===
- (Norway) Commander of the Order of St. Olav (1 July 1957)
- (Finland) 2nd Class of the Order of the Cross of Liberty with swords
- Knight 1st Class of the Order of the White Rose of Finland
- (Latvia) Officer of the Order of the Three Stars
- (Poland) Officer of the Order of Polonia Restituta
- (Nazi Germany) 2nd Class of the Order of the German Eagle
- (Norway) King Haakon VII Freedom Cross

== Honours ==
- Member of the Royal Swedish Society of Naval Sciences (1931)

Military offices
Preceded by Johan Eskil Gester	Defence Staff's Cryptology Department; 1940–1942	Succeeded by None
Government offices
Preceded by None	Director-General of National Defence Radio Establishment; 1942–1957	Succeeded by Gustaf Tham
