= Lund Observatory =

Observatory

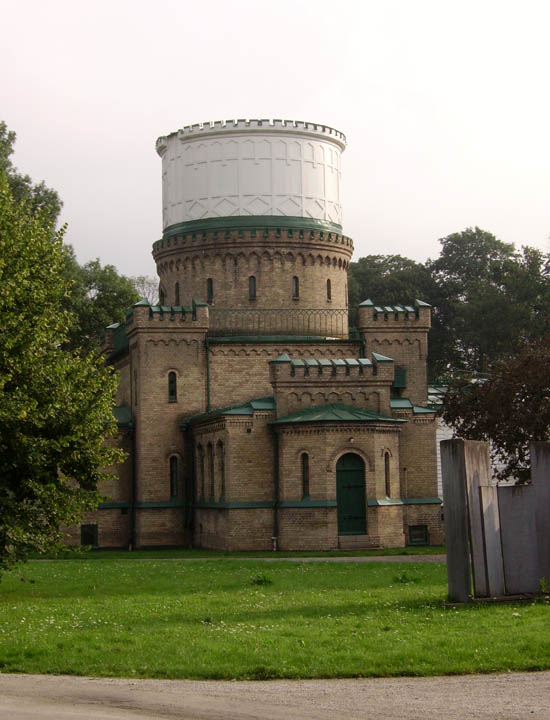
- The Old Observatory historic building inaugurated in 1867.
- Organization: University of Lund
- Observatory code: 039
- Location: Lund, Sweden
- Coordinates: 55.699580°N 13.187850°E
- Established: 1749
- Website: www.astro.lu.se
- Related media on Commons

Lund Observatory was the official English name for the astronomy department at Lund University, and is currently used as a network of researchers within astronomy and space related research areas, administered by the Department of Physics. Between 1867-2001 "Lund Observatory" was also the name of the Observatory building, which is now referred to as the "Lund Old Observatory". Lund Observatory was part of the Department of Astronomy and Theoretical Physics at Lund University until 2023, when that department merged with Department of Physics. Today astronomical research is carried out in several departments and there is also an active research area in Philosophy and related areas that contributes to the astronomical landscape at Lund University.

== History ==
The institution was founded in 1749, but was preceded by an observatory built by astronomy professor Anders Spole (the grandfather of Anders Celsius) in 1672, which was destroyed at the Battle of Lund in 1676. The now old observatory from 1867 is located in a cultural-heritage protected observatory park just outside the medieval city boundaries. The department left these premises in 2001 for a new building on the northern campus of Lund University, inaugurated in 2001, using the nearby old water tower as their new location for astronomical observations. The history of astronomy in Lund through five centuries is told in the book Lundaögon mot stjärnorna.

== Activities ==
Today Lund Observatory research activity focuses on observational and theoretical astrophysics. Prominent research areas covered include the study of the Milky Way as a galaxy, galaxy formation and evolution, exoplanet research, laboratory astrophysics, high-energy astrophysics, star clusters, and astrometry.

=== The Lund Panorama of the Milky Way ===
Towards the middle 20th century astronomer professor Knut Lundmark, of the Lund Observatory in Sweden, supervised the two engineers Martin Kesküla and Tatjana Kesküla who painstakingly mapped the positions of about 7000 individual stars to create an unprecedented drawing of the Milky Way. The map took two years to complete (it was completed in 1955), measures 2 m (6.6 ft) by 1 m (3.3 ft), and is known as the Lund Panorama of the Milky Way.

=== Lund University Planetarium ===
The department runs a planetarium in Vattenhallen Science Center, welcoming about 14000 visitors per year. The original GOTO projector has been replaced with a digital installation, running the Dark Matter simulation software developed by Sky-Skan.

The planetarium first opened in 1978 in what is now called the Old Observatory. This site saw the premiere of the first planetarium version of Aniara, the epic sci-fi poem written by Swedish Nobel laureate Harry Martinson, in 1988.

Between 2001 and the inauguration of the Vattenhallen in 2010 the planetarium was housed in the city's old water tower.

== See also ==
- 809 Lundia
