= Knut Lundmark =

Swedish astronomer (1889–1958)

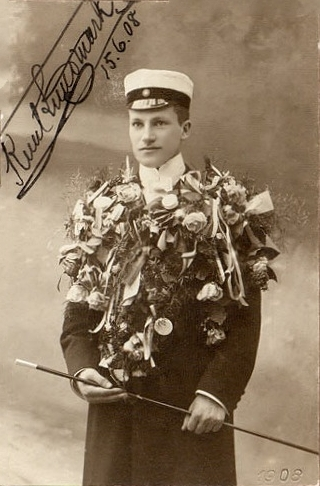
- Knut Lundmark as student in 1908
- Born: 14 June 1889; Älvsbyn, Sweden
- Died: 23 April 1958 (aged 68); Lund, Sweden
- Education: Uppsala University
- Occupation: Astronomer
- Scientific career
- Workplaces: Lund University
- Doctoral students: Frida Palmer

Knut Emil Lundmark (14 June 1889 in Älvsbyn, Sweden – 23 April 1958 in Lund, Sweden), was a Swedish astronomer, professor of astronomy and head of the observatory at Lund University from 1929 to 1955.

Lundmark received his astronomical education at the observatory of Uppsala University. His dissertation (1920) was titled: The relations of the globular clusters and spiral nebulae to the stellar system. During the 1920s he worked at several observatories in the USA, mainly the Lick Observatory and the Mount Wilson Observatory.

Knut Lundmark was one of the pioneers in the modern study of the galaxies and their distances. He was one of the first to suspect that the galaxies are remote stellar systems at vast distances and not nearby objects belonging to our own galaxy, the Milky Way. In 1919 he measured the distance to M31 – the Andromeda Galaxy, to 650,000 light years (about a fourth of the present day value) using magnitudes of novae found in M31 and comparing them to nearby ones with known distances. Lundmark's work contributed to the later famous Great Debate over whether nebulae were galaxies or concentrations of glowing gas.

Lundmark also studied the light distribution in the galaxies, and discovered that the distribution could only properly be explained if the galaxies contained vast amounts of light-blocking dark clouds.

He was the leading writer of popular astronomy among the professional astronomers in Sweden from the 1930s and onwards. He also often appeared in the Swedish national radio with programs on popular astronomy and the history of science. He made generations of Swedes fascinated and interested in astronomy.

The lunar crater Lundmark and the minor planet 1334 Lundmarka were named after him. The Wolf-Lundmark-Melotte Galaxy is named after Lundmark, Max Wolf and Philibert Jacques Melotte.

Lundmark is also widely known by Chinese astronomers for his great work on the catalogue of novae.

== Dark matter ==
A recently found publication from 1930 shows Knut Lundmark to be the first to realise that the universe must contain much more mass than we can observe, now known as dark matter.
