= Thomas C. Lundmark =

American lawyer and legal scholar

Thomas Craig Lundmark (born December 6, 1949, San Diego, died April 14, 2026 Hilversum, is an American lawyer and legal scholar, specialising in comparative law and legal theory (jurisprudence). He was Professor of Common Law and Legal Theory at the Westfälische Wilhelms-Universität Münster from 1997 to 2015, where he is now emeritus professor. He presently holds the HK Bevan Chair in Law at the University of Hull.

== Education and background ==
Following the completion of an undergraduate degree (AB) in comparative literature from San Diego State University, including a year at Uppsala Universitet, and following a Juris Doctor (JD) degree from the University of California, Berkeley, Lundmark studied as a Fulbright Scholar at the Albert-Ludwigs-Universität Freiburg. He was awarded the degree Doktor der Rechte (Dr jur) by the Rheinische Friedrich-Wilhelms-Universität Bonn.

== Career ==
Lundmark practised law with a private law firm, and later with the County of San Diego, from 1977 to 1991 before serving for three years as a Fulbright Senior Professor at the Universities of Bonn and Rostock.

In addition to his professorships in Münster and Hull, Lundmark served as a part-time professor of law at the Syddansk Universitet in Odense from 2016 to 2017.

Lundmark is a member of a number of academic societies, including American Society of Comparative Law, British Association of Comparative Law, British Institute of International and Comparative Law, European Law Institute, Internationale Vereinigung für Rechts- und Sozialphilosophie e.V. – Deutsche Sektion, Nederlandse Vereniging voor Rechtsvergelijking, Society for Evolutionary Analysis in Law, and Svenska samfundet för jämförande rättsforskning.

== Selected works ==
Lundmark is the author of a number of legal monographs and articles. The most well-known monographs are Charting the divide between common and civil law (OUP 2012), Talking law dictionary with CD-ROM (LexisNexis Deutschland 2007), and Power & Rights in US Constitutional Law (2d ed OUP 1999). He is also the author of Eva Braun: Her Life and Times 1912–1945 (Birch Grove Publ 2018).

His most important articles include ‘Auslegung von Rechtsprechung’, Neue Juristische Wochenschrift 1-2/2020, pp 28–31, ‘Legal Science and European Harmonisation’ (2014) 130 Law Quarterly Review 68, ‘Verbose Contracts’ (2001) 49 American Journal of Comparative Law 121–132, and ‘Stare decisis (vor dem Bundesverfassungsgericht)’ (1997) 28 Rechtstheorie 315.

His book Universal Legal Reasoning is due to be published by Oxford University Press in 2021.

== Research interests ==
Lundmark is presently conducting research for a book titled Sentimental Jurisprudence, which extends Adam Smith’s observations and ideas in The Theory of Moral Sentiments while incorporating modern research from neuropsychology. He is also developing innovative research into the field of legal Märchenforschung, analysing the links between jurisprudence, morality, and folk tales. He hopes to use his interest and expertise in literature and law to offer a new mode of critical jurisprudential theory to reveal meta principles within folk tales. The results will be made available to a general audience and for use in schools, as a novel introduction to legal principles, and to promote engagement with society in a wider sense.
