= Signals intelligence operational platforms by nation =

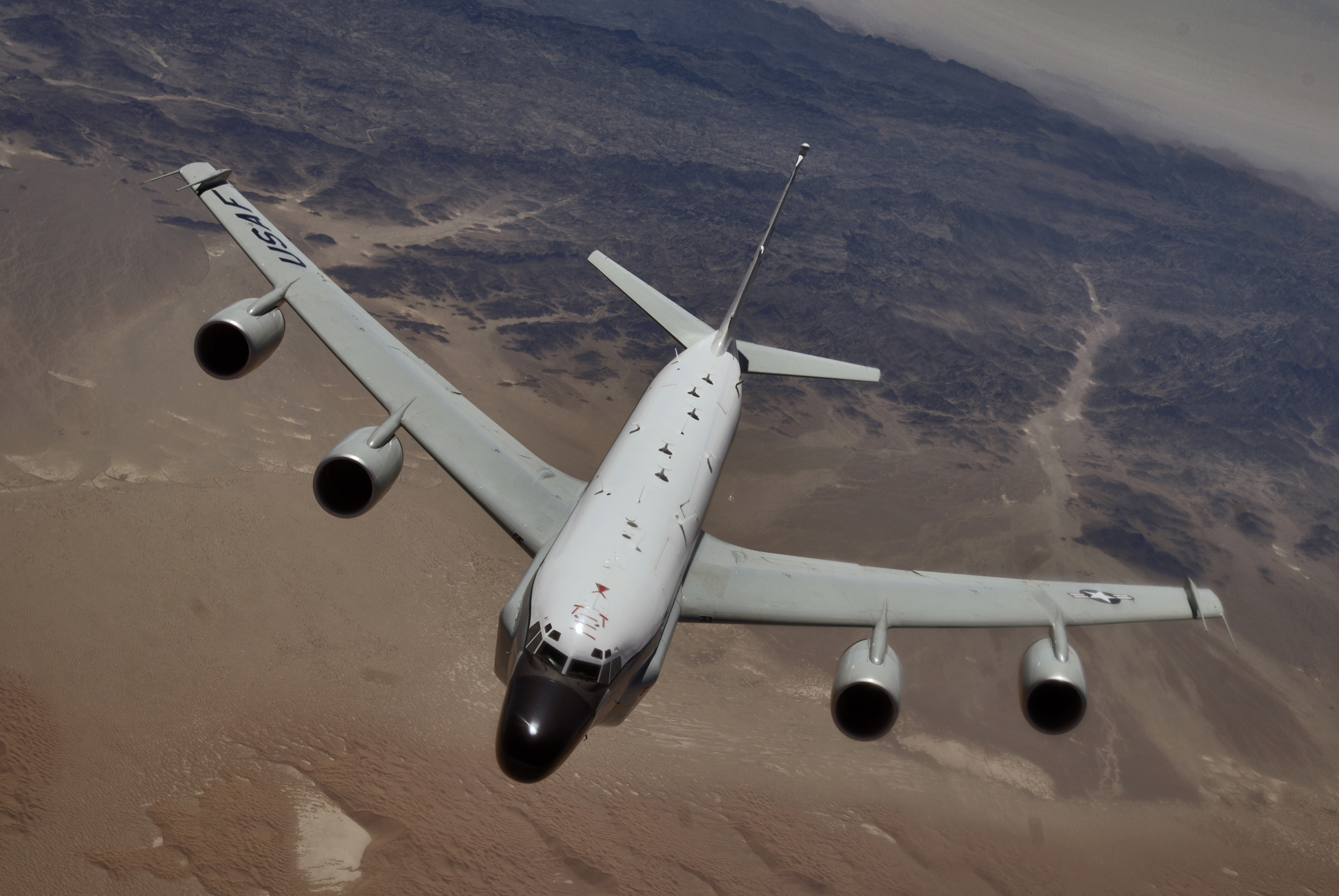
A United States Air Force Boeing RC-135 aircraft in flight

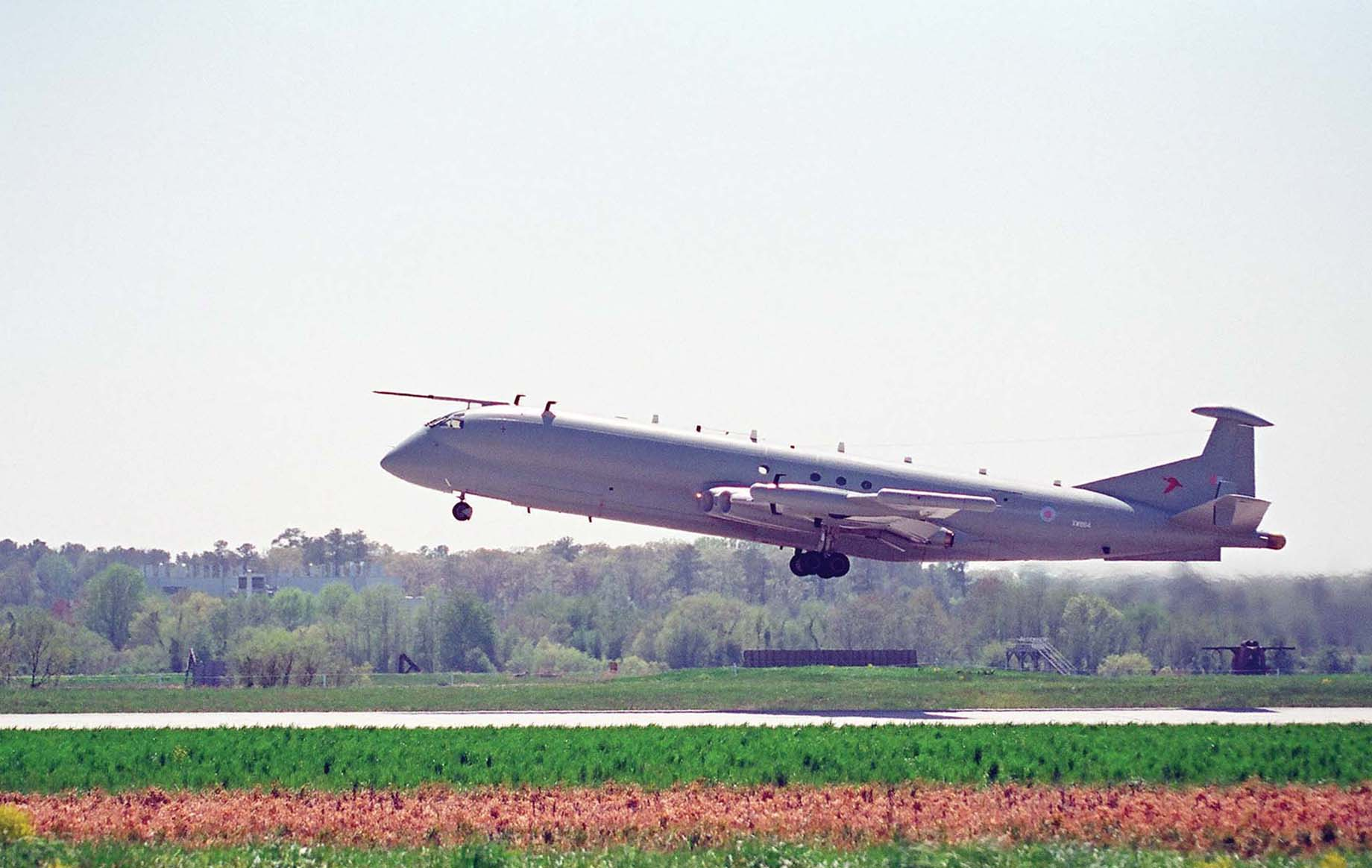
Royal Air Force Hawker Siddeley Nimrod

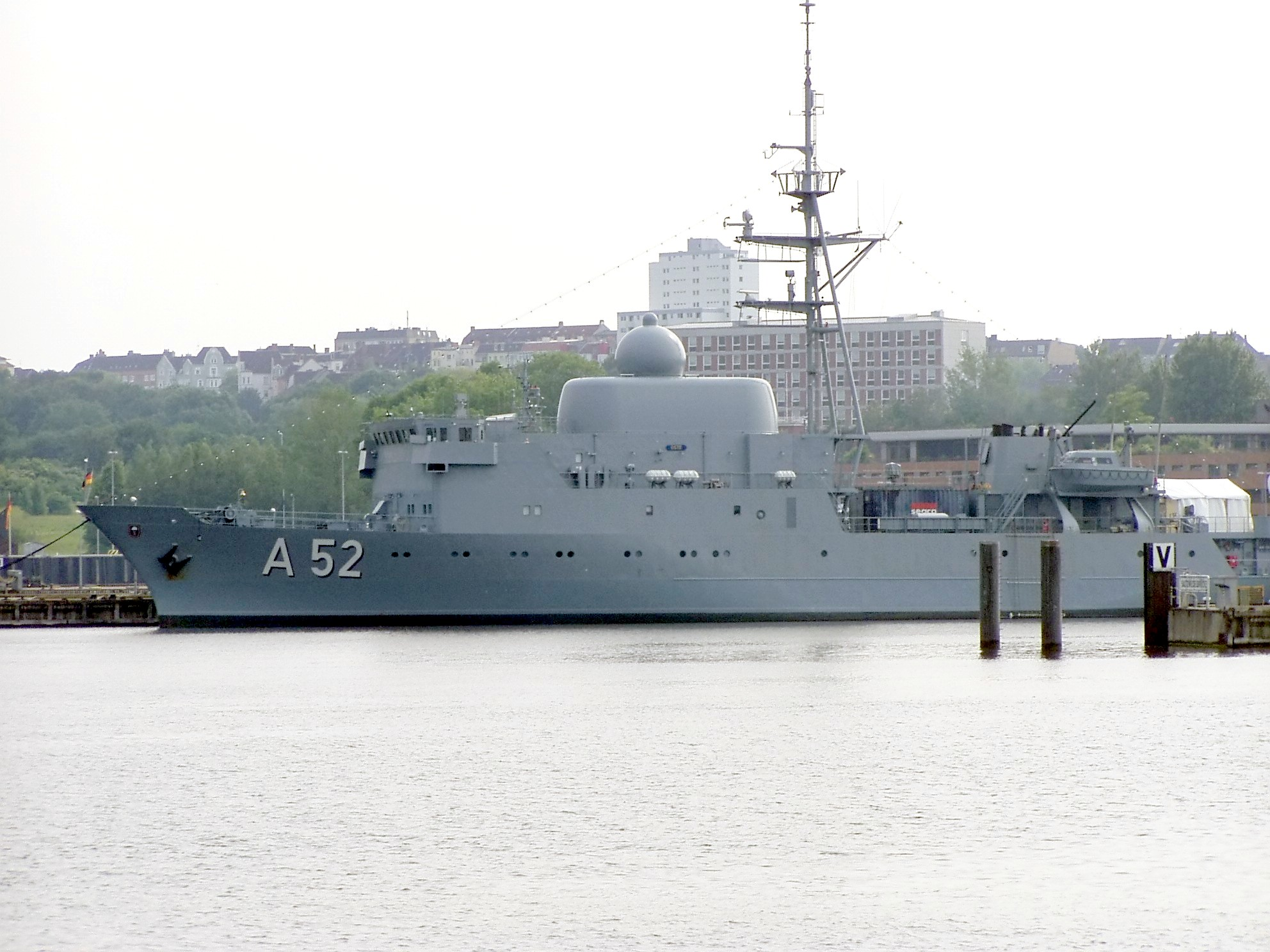
A52 Oste, an Oste class ELINT and reconnaissance ship, of the German Navy

Signals intelligence operational platforms are employed by nations to collect signals intelligence, which is intelligence-gathering by interception of signals, whether between people (i.e., COMINT or communications intelligence) or between machines (i.e., ELINT or electronic intelligence), or mixtures of the two. As sensitive information is often encrypted, signals intelligence often involves the use of cryptanalysis. However, traffic analysis—the study of who is signalling whom and in what quantity—can often produce valuable information, even when the messages themselves cannot be decrypted.

== Ground platforms ==
It can be difficult to draw the line between a ground-based SIGINT receiving station, and facilities that have control, coordination, and processing functions in the "bigger picture" of signals intelligence. Many stations, for the countries with stations in many parts of the world, do have both aspects. There are also some that are clearly intercept only.

The first signals intelligence platforms were listening stations on the ground. Early tactical stations were in use as early as World War I, but permanent strategic signals intelligence stations were established as world tensions grew before WWII.

Arguably, one combined intercept and jamming technique of WWI was the use of shotguns against carrier pigeons, followed by reading the message attached to the bird.

While pigeons can probably be safe, other collection techniques may enjoy a resurgence. One specialized technique, originally used in the First World War but again in the Korean War, was interception using ground return from wired telephones. In mountainous terrain, it might again have applications, such as Afghan caves where wire might be run without the danger of free-space interception.

Satellite communications generally must be intercepted by large parabolic antennas on the ground, although there are possibilities that aircraft, intelligence satellites, and ships might also intercept. "To receive satellite signals ... only parabolic antennas are used. If the parabolic antennas are standing on an open site, it is possible to calculate on the basis of their position, their elevation and their compass (azimuth) angle which satellite is being received. This is possible, for example, in Morwenstow (UK), Yakima (USA) or Sugar Grove (USA)."

=== Australia: ground platforms ===
The current (2019) Joint Military Communications Ground Station (JMCGS) is a SIGnals INTelligence intercept facility located at Kojarena appx 15 Mi east north east of Geraldton, Western Australia. The facility has been built in the early 1990s and originally manned by AUS defence personnel, later augmented by UK personnel previously assigned to Hong Kong. In 2007 the AUS and US authorities approved a Memorandum Of Understanding (MOU) stipulating the expansion and future rules of cooperation for the JMCGS. The new facility, becoming ops in 2010, is equipped with 4 large 25m radomes covering dish antennas intended to monitor and intercept voice and metadata SATellite COMmunications. The other antennas, a 15m radome and seven uncovered smaller dishes, are intended for the fully automated US naval Mobile User Objective System, a new 'next generation' narrowband networked satellite constellation for Ultra-High-Frequency satellite communications enabling secure all-weather and all-terrain 3 and 4G mobile telecommunications. The JMCGS is controlled by the Australian Signals Directorate (ASD) and is being operated under the UKUSA agreement meaning that all data obtained is being shared with the NSA.

The Joint Defence Facility Pine Gap (JDFPG) a.k.a. Pine Gap facility is located approximately 12 Mi west south west of Alice Springs, Northern Territory. JDFPG has been established in 1966, originally as a satellite relay station becoming operational in 1970 as US-Australian NAVDET Combined Support Group with approximately 100 AUS and US military personnel. In 1989 the unit was renamed Joint Defense Space Research Facility, Pine Gap, in 1998 becoming US Naval Security Group Detachment, Alice Springs and in 2005 becoming Navy Information Operations Detachment (NIOD) Alice Springs, Australia. Currently (2019) NIOD Alice Springs strength is approximately 700 AUS and US military and it is operating as an Echelon IV station subordinate to NIOC Maryland (CTF 1060). The JDFPG is currently equipped with six large radomes and 13 small radomes and uncovered dishes intended for military and civilian SATCOM, cellphone and internet voice and metadata interception. JDFPG is also being controlled by the Australian Signals Directorate (ASD) and is being operated under the UKUSA agreement.

Former press and media statements that the facility is being operated by the CIA have never been confirmed; there is no proof of US civilian presence at JDFPG.

The Joint Defence Facility Nurrungar (JDFN), located approximately 9 Mi south of Woomera, South Australia, was a ground station operated by the Australian Department of Defence and the USAF. Its official mission was space-based surveillance, in particular early warning for ICBM launches and nuclear detonations using US Defense Support Program satellites in geostationary orbits. Nurrungar derives from an aboriginal term meaning "listen". JDFN has been operational from 1969 through to its closure in 1999.

The Department of Defence Receiving Station Shoal Bay is located approximately 12 Mi north east of Darwin, Northern Territory. Shoal Bay is being controlled and operated by the Australian Signals Directorate (ASD) and its mission is SATCOM interception as well as interception of high frequency signals. It has a staff of 85 military and civilian personnel and is currently (2019) equipped with 14 dish antennas.

=== Cuba: ground platforms ===
While Cuba had traditionally been a Soviet client, it both has been developing indigenous capabilities, including equipment design and manufacture, as well as having Chinese-operated stations on its soil. Within the Cuban intelligence ministry, a Counter-Electronic Warfare Department was established in 1997, at the same level as the Technical Department and the Foreign Intelligence) Department. In 1992, a tactically oriented Counter-Electronic Warfare Department was created. The national intelligence organization also runs electronic warfare and SIGINT for the Air Force and Navy.

Russia and China, at various times, have operated or are operating intercept stations in Cuba. The largest and best-known, Lourdes SIGINT Station, was shut down by Russia in 2001, along with the Russian station at Cam Ranh Bay, Vietnam. Of the additional bases are in Cuba, two of which are operated by China:

- Bejucal
- Yaguajay
- Santiago de Cuba
- Paseo

Chinese personnel, in 1998, began operating the Bejucal and Santiago de Cuba facilities. The first seems concerned with intercepting US telephone communications and data traffic, while the second appears aimed at US military satellites One is a large complex at Bejucal, just south of Havana, which has ten SATCOM antennas, and which is primarily concerned with intercepting telephone communications in the US. A 'cyber-warfare' unit at the station focuses on computer data traffic. The second is located northeast of Santiago de Cuba at the easternmost part of the country and is 'dedicated mainly to intercepting U.S. military satellite communications'.

=== France: ground platforms ===
==== France: strategic ground platforms ====
The technical department of the French espionage service, DGSE, operates a major communications satellite collection site at Domme, in the Dordogne valley to the east of Bordeaux, in south-western France. This site, which includes at least 11 collection antennas, seven of them directed at Atlantic satellites, is clearly as extensive and capable as sites in the UKUSA network. Reports by journalists, cited in the European Parliament report, confirm the Domme installation, and also a facility at Alluetts-le-Roi near Paris. There were also reports of stations in Kourou in French Guiana and in Mayotte.

==== France: tactical ground platforms ====
At the tactical force protection levels, Thales was awarded a contract to build SAEC (Station d'Appui Electronique de Contact) force protection stations, by the French defence procurement agency (DGA). The contract was awarded in 2004 and initial operational capability is expected by 2007.

The SAEC is an armored vehicle carrying ELINT and the Thales XPLORER COMINT to complement EW platforms. It will have wideband acquisition, direction-finding and analysis sensors, for real-time monitoring and recording for subsequent analysis. It can operate standalone, or network using VHF (PR4G) and HF (TRC3700) communication systems for networking with other SAEC and the SGEA higher level EW system.

SGEA will do intelligence fusion, including from UAV-carried sensor, and coordinate with electronic attack.

=== Germany: ground platforms ===
==== Germany: strategic ground platforms ====
Germany operates a strategic ground station of Kommando Cyber- und Informationsraum of the Bundeswehr, in Gelsdorf, which is responsible for controlling Germany's SAR Lupe and its replacement, the SARah, system and analysing the retrieved data. A large data archive of images will be kept in a former Cold War bunker. Its data is shared with the Bundesnachrichtendienst BND.

==== Germany: tactical ground platforms ====
Germany operates several tactical ground platforms for SIGINT gathering.

- Bad Aibling: ex US Army SIGINT now BND Satcom and cellular monitoring
- Bramstedtlund: BND directionfinder
- Butzbach: BND directionfinder
- Gablingen: ex US Army SIGINT now BND directionfinder
- Hof: ex US Army SIGINT now BND Satcom intercept
- Langen: ex USAF Rhein/Main site now BND cellular monitoring
- Rheinhausen: BND Satcom intercept
- Schöningen: BND Satcom intercept
- Stadum: Bundeswehr HF-SIGINT intercept
- Übersee: BND directionfinder

=== India: ground platforms ===
==== India: strategic ground platforms ====
India is known to operate a strategic signals intelligence platform developed as part of "Programme Divya Drishti" by the Defence Electronics Research Laboratory of DRDO. The system is operated by the Indian Army.

==== India: tactical ground platforms ====
The primary platform for tactical signals intelligence in the Indian Army is based on the Samyukta Electronic Warfare System developed by the Defence Electronics Research Laboratory of DRDO.

In addition to Samyukta, other role-specific tactical platforms include:

- Himashakti, a signals intelligence platform for operations in mountainous terrain to support constrained logistics and mobility challenges.
- Himraj, a Ground Based Mobile ELINT System (GBMES) of the Indian Air Force that operates in the wide frequency range covering both communication and Radar bands.

=== New Zealand: ground platforms ===
During the Second World War, New Zealand established seven radio interception stations to support the Anglo-American war effort against Japan. These seven stations and their Wellington intelligence headquarters were linked to the Allied analysis centres in Australia. In 1949, the Royal New Zealand Navy established a permanent radio-receiving station called NR1 (Navy Receiver 1), which was located south of Waiouru. NR1 was situated beside the Navy's main radio receiving Station, NR2. NR1 operated for thirty-three years until being closed down in 1982. On February 15, 1955, the New Zealand Combined Signals Organization (NZCSO) was established to collect signals intelligence and to operate the NR1 station. Between 1955 and 1974, New Zealand signal officers were also regularly posted to a secret interception station in Singapore which was jointly run by Britain and Australia. According to the peace researcher and journalist Nicky Hager, this station was used to support British and later American military operations in Southeast Asia.

As of 2013, New Zealand has two ground-based signals intelligence stations at Tangimoana in the North Island's Manawatu-Wanganui region and the Waihopai Valley in the South Island's Marlborough region. These two stations are currently run and operated by the Government Communications Security Bureau, the successor to the NZCSO and New Zealand's main signals intelligence agency which was established in 1977. The GCSB is also member of the five-member UKUSA Agreement, which also includes the SIGINT intelligence services of the United Kingdom, the United States, Canada and Australia. The Tangimoana Station was built in 1981 by the Third National Government and began operations in 1983. Its existence was first revealed by the peace activist Owen Wilkes and subsequently confirmed by the National Party Prime Minister Robert Muldoon in June 1984. Meanwhile, the Waihopai Station was built by the Fourth Labour Government in April 1988 and began operations on September 8, 1989. According to Nicky Hager, the Waihopai Station was established to operate in tandem with the Australian Defence Satellite Communications Station near Geraldton in Western Australia.

According to the academic Teresia Teaiwa, New Zealand, as part of the UKUSA alliance, collected and analyzed low frequency radio and international satellite communications from the South Pacific region. Known targets have included Vanuatu, the French overseas departments of New Caledonia and French Polynesia, Fiji, Kiribati, Tonga, Tuvalu, and the Solomon Islands. Besides Pacific governments, other targets have included non-UKUSA diplomatic missions businesses, and international organizations operating in the South Pacific. According to Hager, the GCSB's ground-based signal stations have in the past intercepted a wide range of foreign electronic communications including Japanese diplomatic cables, French military activities and nuclear weapons testing in the South Pacific, Pacific states' military maneuvers and trade agreements with the Soviet Union, and Russian/Soviet ships in the region and research bases in Antarctica.

=== Russia: ground platforms ===
==== Russia: strategic ground platforms ====
Russia closed its major ground collection stations at Lourdes in Cuba and Cam Ranh Bay in Vietnam. Stations remain at the Ras Karma Military Airbase, near QaDub on Socotra Island in Yemen, across the Red Sea to Somalia, and at the mouth of the Gulf of Aden in the Indian Ocean. An inactive station at Ramona in North Korea may reopen.

==== Russia: tactical ground platforms ====
Arbalet-M is mentioned in Russian literature as a portable direction-finding and electronic attack system used in the Second Chechen War.

=== Turkey: ground platform ===
After 17–25 December Operations against government, existence of Genelkurmay Elektronik Sistemler (General Staff Electronic Systems) revealed. In 2012 institution assigned to MIT(National Intelligence Agency).

=== United Kingdom: ground platforms ===
==== United Kingdom: strategic ground platforms ====
Journalist Duncan Campbell alleges that Ayios Nikolaos Station on Cyprus is a British SigInt collection installation. He further alleges that GCHQ Bude in Cornwall is also a SigInt collection system associated with the Echelon network.

=== United States: ground platforms ===
That TENCAP and TIARA complement one another, and benefit tactical and strategic units.

==== United States: strategic ground platforms ====
NSA, with NRO cooperation, operates a number of National Security Agency/Central Security Service (NSA/CSS) sites and other support activities.

- Europe
  - Germany
    - Bad Aibling. After deactivation in 2004 area handed over to the German authorities. Bundeswehr installed a communications unit on the premises using most of the antennas and several buildings. They are converted into a Technological Park. Current status: Bundesheer Bundesnachrichtendienst and various civil investment groups.
    - Dagger Complex. The INSCOM European Cryptologic Center (ECC) - Darmstadt, also comprising the ICEBOX facility at 49°51'20"N 8°35'12" E and the TENCAP facility at 49°51'18"N 8°35'43"E. All are assigned 66th Military Intelligence Brigade - Wiesbaden.
      - Consolidated Intelligence Center - Wiesbaden, Germany
  - United Kingdom
    - GCHQ Bude - Morwenstow, United Kingdom
    - RAF Menwith Hill, United Kingdom
- Australia
  - Geraldton
  - Pine Gap
  - Shoal Bay
- Asia
  - Misawa Air Force Base, Japan (USMC Support Company E)
- North America
  - NSA/CSS Colorado
  - NSA/CSS Georgia
  - NSA/CSS Hawaii

The Marine units report National SIGINT Operations Center at NSA headquarters at Ft. Meade, MD. These facilities often have both a SIGINT receiving and a higher-level management and control function.

Jeffrey Richelson, for the George Washington University National Security Archive, links the Air Force's 544th Intelligence Group with ECHELON operations. He places its Detachment 2 located at Sabana Seca, Puerto Rico; Detachment 3 at Sugar Grove, West Virginia; and Detachment 4 at Yakima, Washington.

In the 1994 Air Intelligence Agency (AIA) history, Misawa is specifically associated with ECHELON only in the context of a collection system called LADYLOVE. Misawa, although many of its SIGINT units were deactivated in 2000–2001, still had an RSOC coordination role. The AIA history says the "Misawa LADYLOVE activity was initiated during the Cold War to intercept Soviet military communications transmitted via satellite—along with similar operations at Menwith Hill, UK; Bad Aibling, Germany; and Rosman, North Carolina."

According to Duncan Campbell, "In 1999, the Sabana Seca field station appeared to have at least four radomes for satellite communications, one located beside an existing high frequency interception system targeted on Cuban radio communications." According to Richelson, this is the assignment of Detachment 2 of the 544th Intelligence Group.

The Naval Security Group Activity (NAVSECGRUACT) at Sugar Grove, West Virginia, has missions defined including "maintaining and operating an ECHELON site". Detachment 3 of the US Air Force 544th Intelligence Group is a tenant at Sugar Grove, and the 544th has been associated with ECHELON activities. While the main subordinate command at Sugar Grove is redacted, it would appear, given the presence of large satellite antennas at Sugar Grove, but it not appearing in lists of NSOCs, that it is principally an intercept facility. Campbell associates Sugar Grove with NSA programs called TIMBERLINE, LANFORD, LATERAL, and SALUTE.

The Yakima site, home of Detachment 4 of the 544th, is considered an ECHELON site: "Six satellite antennas have been installed on the site [they are claimed to be] trained on Intelsat satellites over the Pacific (two satellite antennas) and Intelsat satellites over the Atlantic, and on Inmarsat Satellite 2.

"The fact that Yakima was established at the same time as the first generation of Intelsat satellites went into orbit, and the general description of the tasks of the 544th Intelligence Group, suggest that the station has a role in global communications surveillance. A further clue is provided by Yakima's proximity to a normal satellite receiving station, which lies 100 miles (160 km) to the north."

==== United States: tactical ground systems ====
Some systems are used at land stations of all services. AN/TSQ-190(V) TROJAN SPIRIT II (TS II) is a mobile SHF satellite communications (SATCOM) system that uses commercial or military satellites to receive, transmit, and process secure, voice, data, video teleconferencing (VTC), and facsimile communications. It provides 14 channels of digital voice or data, to intelligence (SCI) or general military (GENSER) with a maximum aggregate data rate of 1.544 megabits per second (Mbit/s). LAN communications are supported by SCI and GENSER Ethernet. Routers provide access to the SIPRNet, JWICS, NSA networks, and the defense SATCOM system, as needed for coordinating MAGTF SIGINT and other intelligence operations. The system fits into 3 HMMWVs with mounted standard integrated command postlightweight multipurpose shelters, tunnel-mounted power generation units, and towed 2.4 meter (C, Kuband) and 6.1 meter (C, Ku, X-band) antennas.

TROJAN SPIRIT II is being replaced by AN/TSQ-226(V)TROJAN SPIRIT LITE. The TROJAN SPIRIT LITE is fielded in three versions:

- (V)1 -a commercial off-the-shelf version in a transit case configuration used to augment Military Intelligence dissemination and communications requirements primarily at corps and division, and some EAC
- (V)2) for the Marines
- (V)2-SBCT (pallet, shelter, ECV, trailer) for Army Brigade Combat Teams
- (V)3 is similar to (V)2 but adds an additional shelter and workstation.
- (V)4 for Echelons above Corps

Both TROJAN SPIRIT II and TROJAN SPIRIT LITE will transition to the Warfighter Information Network-Tactical (WIN-T).

===== US Army: tactical ground stations =====
While some may call "Transformation of the United States Army" a "buzzword", the idea reflects some very major changes. Among the most basic is moving away from the Division as the fundamental unit of action, and moving to smaller and more flexible Brigade combat teams (BCT). As a very basic part of those changes, not only are considerably more intelligence assets being assigned to the BCTs, but to larger army formations. In both these cases, SIGINT represents a very major portion of the growth in assets. Each combat BCT has an organic military intelligence (MI) company, with improved SIGINT capability. In addition, five battlefield surveillance brigades (BfSB), of which an MI Collection Battalion is the core element, are being formed. Each of those battalions is 1/3 SIGINT; the Army expects to have more than 7,000 new MI soldiers by 2013.

Prophet Block I began rolling out in 1999–2000, and was operational in Afghanistan. It replaced the AN/TSQ-138 Trailblazer, AN/TRQ-32 Teammate, AN/TLQ-17A Trafficjam, and the AN/PRD-12 systems. The system will be getting incremental improvements, which reflect both improvements in technology and in military organizational structure. At the time of initial operational capability, the assumption was that PROPHET would be issued six systems per division, four per armored cavalry regiment (ACR), three per Initial Brigade Combat Team (IBCT). Tasking for Prophet will come from primarily from the division-level Analysis and Control Element, modified by brigade-specific priorities and then send them to the Prophet via SINCGARS radio.

Physically, the basic Prophet platform is built around a mounted AN/PRD-13(V)2 direction-finding (DF) system designed to provide force protection in a DS role to the maneuver brigade. This system operates in the HF, VHF and UHF spectra. It provides line-of-bearing (LOB) data and intercept on unencrypted, single-channel push-to-talk transmissions.

It can be put into subassemblies that can be carried by a four-man team individual soldiers, although the more common deployment will be in an M1097 HMMWV. In the vehicle-mounted variant, it can operate while moving; the vehicle also has racks for two AN/VRC-92 SINCGARS combat-net radios with backpacks, and carries an antenna mast and other equipment.

Tactical communications, not just for SIGINT, are "flattening", such that units do not just report up their chain of command, but to adjacent units. One of the rationales for doing so is that a combat unit can see an opportunity and move against it, without it being misidentified by a neighboring unit and being engaged with "friendly fire."

Prophet Block II adds electronic attack (EA) capability to Prophet, while Block III upgrades the Prophet receiver to collect against advanced and special signals. These enhancements will be coordinated with UAVs and tactical aircraft with expanded SIGINT capability. Blocks IV (expected IOC 2008) and V (expected IOC 2015) add MASINT along with micro-and robotic receivers to the Prophet Ground system.

MASINT will include ground surveillance radars (PPSSD) and the Improved—Remotely Monitored Battlefield Sensor System (I-REMBASS) aboard a shelter-mounted HMMWV. Prophet, with the I-REMBASS monitoring system, will form the Ground Sensor Platoon of the brigade combat team Reconnaissance, Surveillance, and Target Acquisition (RSTA) Squadron.

Prophet Air will begin in a UAV.

For SIGINT operations, the basic US Marine augmentation to Force Recon is a 6-man detachment from a Radio Reconnaissance Platoon. There is a SIGINT platoon within the Intelligence Company of the new Marine Special Operations Support Group.

Army Special Forces have the Special Operations Team-Alpha that can operate with an SF team, or independently. This is a low-level collection team, which typically has four personnel. Their primary equipment is the AN/PRD-13 SOF SIGINT Manpack System (SSMS), with capabilities including direction-finding capability from 2 MHz to 2 GHz, and monitoring from 1 to 1400 MHz.

===== US Marine Corps: tactical ground stations =====
Subordinate to Radio Battalions, US Marines have a multifunction AN/MLQ-36 Mobile Electronic Warfare Support System that gives the operators limited armor protection. It contains

- Two WJ-8618B(S1) acquisition receivers and a WJ-32850 MANTIS DF system which, together, provide signal intercept and radio direction finding
- One AN/ULQ-19(V) electronic attack set
- a secure communications system,
- an intercom system installed
- logistics variant of the light armored vehicle (LAV)-25

The AN/PRD-12 is a tactical, man-transportable system that provides search, intercept, and DF on communications signals in the HF/VHF/UHF bands. Up to four PRD-12 stations can be networked, providing DF data to a mission control station via radio link with single-channel ground and airborne radio system (SINCGARS) equipment. Any of the four stations can act as mission control.

Assigned 1 per Marine Division, 1 per Marine Air Wing, and one per Radio Battalion, the AN/MSC-63A is a shelterized communications switch that provides a secure semiautomated data communications switch and terminals for the processing of general service (GENSER) or defense special security communications system (DSSCS) sensitive compartmented information (SCI) record message traffic.

The AN/TSQ-130(V)2/(V)5 technical control and analysis center (TCAC) is a tactical, transportable, SIGINT-processing, analysis and reporting system installed in a large, selfcontained, modified S-280G shelter. TCAC is the primary system used by the Radio Battalion SIGINT support unit. The (V)2 is the baseline system, while the (V)5 has upgraded communications capabilities. It is to be replaced by the AN/MYQ-8 TCAC-PIP will replace the TCAC.

AN/MYQ-8 will consist of three remoteable analysis workstations (RAWSs), one communications interface module (CIM), and one supervisor control module (SCM). Remoteable Analysis Workstations (RAWS) provides the capability to do analysis and reporting in or away from the shelter, connecting via LAN or radio in the latter case. It also can operate in a stand-alone mode. Communications Interface Modules (CIM) provide man-machine interface between the TCAC PIP and other RadBn systems (e.g., team portable collection system, mobile electronic warfare support system) or external intelligence agencies. The Supervisor Control Module (SCM) is an administrator interface to file server and system supervision of the TCAC.

The AN/USC-55 commander's tactical terminal (CTT) is a multiservice-developed, special application, UHF satellite communications receiver that can be dedicated to receive critical, timesensitive intelligence by commanders and intelligence centers at all echelons, in near-real-time, at GENSER or SCI levels. The receiver provides one full-duplex and two receive-only channels.

The team portable collection system (TPCS) upgrade is a semiautomated, man-transportable communications intelligence (COMINT) system. It provides intercept, collection, radio direction finding, analysis, reporting, and collection management support. T The TPCS upgrade made up of three subsystems:

- COMINT collection subsystem (CCS), including the AN/PRD-12 direction finding set (to be replaced by TOPMAKER) and collection receivers
- analysis subsystem (AS)
- communications subsystem (CS) using single-channel radio nets are used to link TPCS upgrade outstations with the RadBn TCAC to allow automated processing and dissemination of collected information and ultimate dissemination to the MAGTF G-2/S-2 and other organizations.

Intended for the Radio Reconnaissance Teams attached to Marine Expeditionary Units, the radio reconnaissance equipment program (RREP) SIGINT suite (SS)-1 is a semiautomated, integrated, open architecture radio intercept and DF system composed of a ruggedized computer and six functional modules that plug together. RREP SS-1 modules may operate independently or semi-independently. SS-1 enables the radio reconnaissance teams (RRTs) to target the majority of low-level, single-channel, unencrypted tactical signals of interest used by military, police, insurgents, and other potential hostile forces throughout the world.

The RREP SS-2 will provide a highly deployable, man-transportable, signals intercept and DF system employed by RRTs in support of the entire spectrum of MAGTF operations. RREP SS-2 employs advanced receiver capabilities, cellular phone and other digital communications collection and DF technology, global positioning system map navigation software, a more modular design, and electronic attack capabilities. As with RREP SS-1, the SS-2 operates at the modular level and at the integrated system level. The system can be controlled manually or via subcompact personal computer.

The handheld integrated directional receiver and homing (HIDRAH) system is a man-transportable, tactical, cordless, radio intercept and signal line-of-bearing (LOB) DF system consisting of several COTS items in an enclosure appropriate for the field. HIDRAH provides RRTs with a threat I&W capability during radio reconnaissance foot-mobile patrols and signal homing support for tactical recovery of aircraft and personnel operations. The HIDRAH system has a unique design that may be employed independently in a handheld manner or by mounting it to an M16 or M4 rifles.

===== US Army and Marines: tactical ground stations =====
An improved version of the AN/MLQ-36, used by the Army and Marines, is a multifunction, open-architecture AN/MLQ-36A Mobile Electronic Warfare Support System Product Improvement Program, which is a total replacement of the electronics in the AN/MLQ-36. The MEWSS PIP provides the ability to detect and evaluate enemy communications emissions, detect and categorize enemy noncommunications emissions (i.e., battlefield radars), determine Lines-of-Bearing (LOBs), and degrade enemy tactical radio communications during amphibious assaults and subsequent operations ashore. When mission configured, and working cooperatively with other MEWSS PIP platforms, the common suite of equipment can also provide precision location of battlefield emitters. The system is designed to have an automated tasking and reporting data link to other MAGTF assets such as the AN/TSQ-130 Technical Control and Analysis Center (TCAC) PIP. The MEWSS PIP and future enhancements will provide the capability to exploit new and sophisticated enemy electronic emissions and conduct Electronic Attack (EA) in support of existing and planned national, theater, Fleet, and MAGTF SIGINT/EW operations.

== Ship platforms ==
Ad hoc installations were placed on US warships in the 1940 on. Modern ship installations generally involve intercept stations in mobile vans, which can be put onto the deck of a warship, although some nations, such as Russia and Spain, use essentially unarmed modified fishing vessels.

There is a high level of interoperability among NATO vessels, using the Joint Tactical Information Distribution System (JTIDS). While not all ships have sufficiently secure areas for all-source (i.e., including SIGINT) intelligence sensors, commanders with access to all-source information can distribute appropriate parts to units under their command.

=== China: ship platforms ===
China operates at least 10 AGI-type vessels. One of China's main AGI vessels is the Type 815 spy ship.

=== Denmark: ship platforms ===
Denmark can field one containerised SIGINT/ELINT component, to be fitted in its Flyvefisken-class patrol vessels.

=== France: ship platforms ===
France has operated several generations of SIGINT ships, but is moving to its first purpose-built vessel as the third generation. The first, a German cargo ship built in 1958 by a shipyard in Bremen, was transformed in France into an electronic eavesdropping ship between 1976 and 1977. Decommissioned in May 1999, the next generation was a former supply ship used since 1988 by the Nuclear Experiments Department for the Pacific Tests Centre (CEP), named Bougainville. For its new mission, it was equipped with SIGINT sensors and a Syracuse II satellite communication system, and has been operating since July 1999. It carried out significant missions in the Indian Ocean following the 11 September 2001 attacks.

On 14 January 2002, the French Ministry of Defense launched a new purpose-built "Intelligence Gathering Auxiliary" ship project called MINREM, and was named Dupuy de Lôme. The vessel entered service in 2006, to replace Bougainville. Thales provided the electronics, and Compagnie Nationale de Navigation built the ship to requirements defined by the Military Intelligence Directorate (DRM) with a planned 30-year lifetime. Thales assigned overall systems and COMINT to its Thales Communication division, while Thales Defence Mission Systems division does the ELINT.

=== Germany: ship platforms ===
The German Navy operates the Oste-class fleet service ships which are purpose-built SIGINT and ELINT reconnaissance ships. Also other vessels, such as the , Brandenburg and Sachsen-class frigates and Braunschweig-class corvettes are equipped with extensive SIGINT/ELINT gear.

=== India: ship platforms ===
Indian Navy warships are equipped with the following SIGINT and ELINT platforms:

- Ajanta, an early SIGINT and EW platform developed by DRDO for upgradation of Godavari and Brahmaputra classes of frigates.
- Ellora, a SIGINT and EW platform that was developed as part of "Programme Sangraha" of DRDO and utilised on Brahmaputra and Shivalik classes of frigates and Delhi and Kolkata classes of destroyers
- Nayan, a COMINT system developed under "Programme Samudrika" to equip the Visakhapatnam-class destroyer and P17A frigates.

It is also presumed that the INS Dhruv and INS Anvesh have a secondary role for SIGINT and ELINT operations.

=== Iran ===
The Islamic Republic of Iran Navy used to operate the IRIS Zagros.

=== New Zealand: ship platforms ===
The Government Communications Security Bureau has trained and used Royal New Zealand Navy Electronic Warfare (EW) operators and vessels for intelligence-gathering missions since 1986. Between 1986 and 1990, the New Zealand Navy equipped four of its frigates—HMNZS Canterbury, HMNZS Wellington, HMNZS Waikato, and HMNZS Southland—with US$12.5 million worth of new electronic warfare equipment which had been purchased from the United States, one of the other Five Eyes partners.

The Navy's hydrographic vessel HMNZS Monowai was also used by the GCSB to intercept Fijian military radio communications during the 1987 Fijian coups d'état. The GCSB also outfitted the frigates Canterbury and Waikato with GCSB mobile stations, which were staffed by Navy EW personnel but answered directly to the GCSB. These two warships were also assigned with UKUSA station designations—NZC–334 and NZC–335 respectively—and were deployed on six-week missions to the South Pacific and Southeast Asia during the late 1980s and 1990s.

=== Norway: ship platforms ===
Norway uses FS Marjata, a purpose-built electronic intelligence (ELINT) collection vessel.

=== Poland: ship platforms ===
Poland's Marynarka Wojenna operates ORP Hydrograf and ORP Nawigator.

Two more SIGINT ships of a new class are being built at Remontowa shipyard in Gdansk/Poland.

=== Russia: ship platforms ===
Before and after the breakup of the USSR, the Russian Navy operated a large number of AGI (Auxiliary General Intelligence) intelligence collection "trawlers". such as the Primor'ye class In 1980 the Soviets built a group of more sophisticated purpose built vessels, such as the Balzam and Vishnya-class intelligence ships, which are operated by the Russian Navy today.

=== Spain: ship platforms ===
Spain has been reported to have acquired an ex-East German AGI, which it may operate in cooperation with its SIGINT aircraft. The vessel concerned is the 1,900-ton renamed Alerta, In East German service, she had extensive antennas and a large radome. Based in Cartagena, the SIGINT work is reportedly by two Israeli companies and a Spanish firm. A different source says that the SIGINT equipment is Russian. A Saturn 35 satellite antenna has been, according to Spanish sources, added.

=== Sweden: ship platforms ===
Sweden operates HSwMS Orion which will be replaced by HSwMS Artemis in 2024.

=== United States: ship platforms ===
After two international incidents, US doctrine is to conduct ship-based SIGINT missions with warships, which can protect themselves as Pueblo and Liberty could not. The Gulf of Tonkin incident, in 1964, involved two-destroyer DESOTO patrols equipped with intercept vans, backed up with carrier air patrols. Why this level of protection was not available in 1967 is difficult to understand. One exception, the SIGINT auxiliary USS Sphinx, generally stayed off the Nicaraguan coast.

Current USN warships carry some version of the AN/SLQ-32 electronic warfare system, which has ESM capabilities.

In addition to the AN/SLQ-32, Arleigh Burke-class destroyers are in the process of evaluating an open-architecture Integrated Radar/Optical Sighting and Surveillance System (IROS3) and Ship Protection system, currently including an AN/SPS-73 radar, an electro-optical/infrared sensor, acoustic sensors and spotlights, coupled with remotely controlled machine guns.

Standardized USN systems go beyond simple direction finding and into COMINT. The AN/SLR-25 is a passive cryptologic exploitation system principally for tactical use, but that can make contributions to higher levels of intelligence. The SLR-25(V)1 Advanced Cryptologic Carry-on Exploitation System (ACCES) is a portable version of the SLR-25(V)2 SSEE (Ship Signal Exploitation Equipment) without dedicated SIGINT spaces. Coupled with an AN/SSQ-120 Transportable Radio Direction-Finding system, the ACCES provides a complete SIGINT collection system. The AN/SSQ-120 has HF, VHF, and UHF antennas and direction-finding logic.

More capable than the AN/SLR-25 with AN/SSQ-120 is the AN/SSQ-137 Ship Signal Exploitation System, an open-architecture system for command & control as well as intelligence.

== Submarine platforms ==
Submarines are the original stealth platforms. When no more than a mast breaks the surface, in the worst case they can become radar targets, so virtually all modern submarines will have the minimum ELINT of a radar warning receiver. Far beyond that, however, many submarines will penetrate hostile areas, raise SIGINT receiver masts, usually with some type of radar-observant covering, and listen. Especially sophisticated SIGINT submarines may tap undersea cables.

The minimum radar-warning receiver is usually a set of spiral antennas, backed with resonant cavities, whose amplitude can be compared to determine the direction of greatest signal strength. To go to the next level of sophistication, phase is considered as well as amplitude, and interferometry adds further information.

=== Australia: submarine platforms ===
Australia's Collins class has a SIGINT mission, emphasized when the vessels' combat system was replaced with an open-architecture surveillance system. Among the systems are the ArgoSystems/Condor AR-740.

=== Brazil: submarine platforms ===
Part of the PROSUB program, Brazil's Riachuelo-class submarines are equipped with a Thales DR-3000 ESM receiver, capable of intelligence gathering, tactical situation monitoring, and radar warning.

=== Canada: submarine platforms ===
Canada's acquisition of reconditioned British diesel-electric submarines (ex-Upholder class, now Victoria-class submarine) raised eyebrows of many analysts, wondering how these could have a strategic effect given the underwater strength of Canada's southern neighbour. Writing in the Canadian Military Journal, an officer of Canada's maritime forces gave some subtle insights, of which submarine intelligence capabilities play a significant role. "However, submarines also have a contribution to make in deterring and countering the asymmetric threats that now preoccupy Canadian/US (CANUS) planners. This is centered upon Intelligence-gathering, Surveillance, and Reconnaissance (ISR) activities ... possession of submarines admits Canada to that exclusive group of states participating in regulated and highly classified submarine waterspace management and intelligence-sharing schemes. The intention to re-establish a Pacific submarine presence led to the immediate cooperation of the United States in development of a west coast Waterspace Management Agreement with Canada, whereas none existed previously. Likewise, Arctic transits and deployments by allied submarines are generally first signalled when Canada's Atlantic Submarine Operating Authority is advised of foreign submarine movement across 70 degrees North latitude. Taken together, these various factors result in a capability of strategic importance in so much as it exponentially expands the range of coercive options available to decision-makers."

As part of the upgrade of the Upholder-class submarine purchased from the UK, the Litton Marine Guardian Star is on the Victoria-class submarines.

=== Chile: submarine platforms ===
An ARGOsystems/Condor AR-900 is aboard the French-built Chilean Scorpene-class submarines.

=== China: submarine platforms ===
Israeli Elbit provides the TIMNEX 4 CH ELINT/targeting set, which covers 2–18 GHz, provides radar warning, and 1.4 to 5 degree DF (depending on frequency).

=== Denmark: submarine platforms ===
Danish subs had the UK Racal/Thales Sea Lion precision DF system. Danish subs were phased out on 25 November 2004.

=== Egypt: submarine platforms ===
Egyptian submarines use ArgoSystems/Condor AR-700 series SIGINT for targeting their Harpoon missiles.

=== France: submarine platforms ===
Older French export submarines came with the Thales/Thompson-CSF X-band radar warning system, which is a manual analog system. The digital replacement, in French service, is the ARUR-13. It is reasonable to expect continuing upgrades from the EADS consortium.

=== Germany: submarine platforms ===
German submarines use multiple SIGINT systems. The newer Type 212 submarines use FL 1800U units made by the German-French EADS consortium. These units use four spiral antennas and a radar warning receiver under a common dome, with the ELINT function covering 0.5–18 GHz in five bands. This can achieve 5-degree direction finding.

Airbus (formerly DASA) also equips German submarines with the Telegon 12 HF interception and DF suite.

=== Greece: submarine platforms ===
Greece uses the ArgoSystems/Condor AR-700 series of submarine ELINT/ESM for targeting Harpoon missiles.

=== India: submarine platforms ===
Porpoise, a SIGINT and EW platform that was developed as part of "Programme Sangraha" of DRDO is known to be utilised on some submarines of the Indian Navy

=== Israel: submarine platforms ===
German-built Dolphin submarines in Israeli service have several missions, SIGINT being one of them. Domestic Elbit makes the TIMNEX 4 CH ELINT/targeting set, which covers 2–18 GHz, provides radar warning, and 1.4 to 5 degree DF (depending on frequency).

=== Italy: submarine platforms ===
Older submarines use an Elettronica BLD-727 DF, but the newer Type 212s will use German SIGINT.

=== Netherlands: submarine platforms ===
For Harpoon targeting, the Netherlands uses the ArgoSystems/Condor AR-700 series SIGINT.

=== Russia: submarine platforms ===
Akula and Oscar attack submarines have Rim Hat (NATO designation) Nakat-M SIGINT, which is integrated with a Snoop Pair search radar.

Kilo export diesel-electric submarines have the NATO Squid Head/MRM-25 ESM, which includes IFF.

=== South Africa: submarine platforms ===
The domestic SAAB Grintek Defence (Formally Avitronics) firm installs the Shrike ESM system, covering 2–18 GHz, as does the Israeli Elbit TIMNEX 4 CH ELINT/targeting set, which provides radar warning, and 1.4 to 5 degree DF (depending on frequency). The CelsiusTech-Grintek Ewation partnership probably will provide systems as well.

=== South Korea: submarine platforms ===
These have GTE/Israeli SIGINT.

=== Spain: submarine platforms ===
Spanish boats have the domestically produced Indra BLQ-355, which may have been exported. With its participation in the EADS consortium, Spain obtains access to new technologies. Spain appears to be developing a coordinated SIGINT approach using submarine, ship, and aircraft platforms.

=== Sweden: submarine platforms ===
Sweden uses the ArgoSystems/Condor AR-700 series SIGINT.

=== Taiwan: submarine platforms ===
Israeli Elbit provides the TIMNEX 4 CH ELINT/targeting set, which covers 2–18 GHz, provides radar warning, and 1.4 to 5 degree DF (depending on frequency).

=== United Kingdom: submarine platforms ===
EADS (formerly DASA) also equips British submarines with the CXA(2) HF interception and DF suite. Several submarines have a COMINT system made by US Southwest Research, under the US code name CLUSTER SENTINEL.

Author Sherry Sontag asserted in Blind Man's Bluff: The Untold Story of American Submarine Espionage that British submarines have been involved in collaborative SigInt collection since the 1950s.

=== United States: submarine platforms ===
Under the code names HOLYSTONE, PINNACLE, BOLLARD, and BARNACLE, began in 1959, US submarines infiltrated Soviet harbors to tap communications cables and gather SIGINT. They also had a MASINT mission against Soviet submarines and missiles. The program, which went through several generations, ended when compromised, by Ronald Pelton, in 1981.

US submarines infiltrated the territorial waters of potential opponents to raise low-observability antennas and collect radio SIGINT. US submarines made extensive clandestine patrols to measure the signatures of Soviet submarines and surface vessels. Various submarines, including USS Parche and USS Halibut, from the early 1970s onwards, reportedly tapped Soviet copper and optical undersea cables, using divers, probes from the main vessel, or remotely operated vehicles.

While the Sturgeon-class submarines have been retired, as with any class of submarines, their design had tradeoffs. Sturgeons were more optimized for reconnaissance than the subsequent Los Angeles class, which have greater speed, but less internal space, and optimized for blue water, principally anti-submarine, missions. They used the AN/WLQ-4 "Sea Nymph" SIGINT system, which may have been too large to fit the Los Angeles class. (Some Sturgeon-class submarines such as USS Gurnard were fitted with the AN/WLR-6 and AN/BRD-7 systems in the late 1960s.) The Sturgeon-class submarine Parche received an addition 100-foot (30 m) hull extension containing "research and development equipment" that brought her total length to 401 feet (122 m). Of the three-vessel Seawolf class, USS Jimmy Carter also is of extended length for intelligence systems and special operations. The Seawolf and Los Angeles classes were directed at the Soviet threat, so the newer Virginia class has additional capabilities for the littoral environment.

Los Angeles-class submarines have modernized and smaller ELINT, the AN/WLR-18 "Classic Salmon" for lower frequencies and the AN/WSQ-5 "Cluster Spectator" for higher frequencies. The latter is in a series of code names suggesting it is for tactical use, while the former name is more associated with strategic systems, especially for intelligence. Newer submarines have an AN/WLR-8 radar signal analyzer and an AN/WLR-10 (or AN/BLR-15) radar warning receiver. There are variants, among the classes, of a radar antenna, interferometric direction finder, COMINT receiver.

All US submarines, as new construction on the Virginia-class submarines and retrofitted to the Improved Los Angeles-class submarines and possibly Seawolfs, will receive an upgraded Electronic Support (ES) suite, designed as a minimally manned, passive receiving system capable of detection, acquisition, identification, and localization of a variety of signals of interest. ES contains the AN/BLQ-10 SIGINT system, which gives detection, emitter location and MASINT identification, direction finding, and strategic intelligence support. It was first implemented in 2000 and should be in all US submarines by 2012.

ES is not limited to the AN/BLQ-10 alone, but a major improvement in receiving, with an expected 200% improvement in performance with the Type 18I periscope and Integrated Electronics Mast (IEM), especially in the littorals. Completing the current ES concept is the AN/ULR-21 CLASSIC TROLL system that increases the probability of SIGINT intercept by 500%, supporting tactical and national requirements.

== Aircraft platforms ==
A wide range of aircraft were used with low-tech aircraft such as the WWII B-24 Liberator with temporarily mounted electronics, to platforms extensively modified for the mission, and evolved to strategic RC-135 and EP-3E Aries II aircraft.

=== Argentina: aircraft platforms ===
After its experience in the Falklands, Argentina had a 707 converted to an ELINT aircraft by Israel.

=== Australia: aircraft platforms ===
Australia has operated six Boeing 737 AEW&C Wedgetails since 2010. The 18 AP-3C Orion were upgraded to include fitting each aircraft with a new Elta EL/M-2022(V)3 radar, a nose-mounted Star Safire III electro-optical and infrared system, "highly capable" signals and electronic intelligence (SIGINT/ELINT) equipment, the UYS 503 acoustic system, a new automatic information system processor, a new navigation system based on two Honeywell H764G Embedded GPS/INUs, a new communications system and other improvements. In late 2015 it was announced that a number of Gulfstream G550s are being acquired alongside eight P-8A Poseidons, with reports that they will possibly form the replacement for the electronic intelligence-gathering role performed by the RAAF's AP-3 Orions.

=== Brazil: aircraft platforms ===
The Brazilian Air Force operates eight Embraer E/R-99 aircraft, three of which are the R-99 SIGINT variant, belonging to the 2nd Squadron, 6th Aviation Group (2º/6º GAv) "Guardião" based in the Anápolis Air Force Base and used in the Amazon Surveillance System. The aircraft have recently undergone modernizations, which have included the addition of new MX-15 Optical Electrical Sensors. Additionally, Hermes 450 and Hermes 900 UAVs are operated by the 1st Squadron, 12th Aviation Group (1º/12º GAv) "Hórus" based in the Santa Maria Air Force Base and three R-35AM aircraft equipped with the Thales DR-3000 Mk.2b EWS were also operated by the 1st Squadron, 6th Aviation Group (1º/6º GAv) "Carcará" until their deactivation in 2021 due to maintenance difficulties with the aging aircraft.

=== Chile: aircraft platforms ===
Chile has a full Israeli Phalcon system on a single 707 airframe. This system provides SIGINT as well as airborne radar warning and control.

=== China: aircraft platforms ===
Prof. Desmont Ball identified Chinese the first major airborne SIGINT platforms as the four-turboprop EY-8, a variant of the Russian An-12 'Cub' as China's main ELINT and reconnaissance aircraft a decade ago. EY-8 construction may be continuing for ELINT/SIGINT and electronic warfare missions. This capability, however, is much inferior to the Japanese equivalents. They were supplemented or replaced four locally modified Tu-154Ms, comparable to the Russian 1980s vintage Il-20 ELINT aircraft.

=== France: aircraft platforms ===
France operates the C-160 aircraft twin-turboprop tactical transport, due to be replaced by the Airbus Military A400M transport when that enters service from 2009. The French Air Force will begin retiring its fleet of C-160 transports in 2005. Gabriel SIGINT versions of the Transall are an upgraded electronic surveillance version in service with the French Air Force, which also operates four Astarte strategic communications relay versions. Thales developed the signals intelligence (SIGINT) system for which there are 10 workstations in the main cabin. C-160 fleets of France, Germany and Turkey will be replaced by the Airbus Military A400M transport when that enters service from 2009. The French Air Force will begin retiring its fleet of C-160 transports in 2005.

Originally manufactured by the companies MBB, Nord Aviation and VFW formed the Transall group in 1959 for the development and production of the C-160 for the air forces of France, Germany, South Africa and Turkey. Production of the aircraft by the three companies ended in 1972, with 169 aircraft having been delivered. In 1976, responsibility for production of the aircraft was given to Aerospatiale in France and MBB (now DaimlerChrysler Aerospace) in Germany. Both companies are now part of EADS (European Aeronautics Defence and Space). Production of the aircraft from 1976 to 1985 included updated avionics, a reinforced wing housing and additional fuel tanks.

French Transalls were upgraded in 1999, with a new head-up display and an upgraded electronic warfare suite, with a radar warning receiver, missile approach warner and chaff and decoy dispensers. Navigational systems include EFIS 854 TF Electronic Flight Instrumentation System, which includes an Electronic Attitude Director Indicator (EADI) and Electronic Horizontal Situation Indicator (EHSI). Three new sensors have been installed for aircraft position and attitude control: an inertial reference unit (IRU), an attitude and heading reference unit (AHRU), and a global positioning system (GPS). A flight management system with two Gemini 10 computers and a new radio management system have also been installed.

The Transalls provided NATO SIGINT in Bosnia.

For a number of years, France operated DC-8 aircraft "Sarigue" dedicated to ELINT. A reengined version, Sarigue-NG, went into service in 2000. The name stands for Systeme Aeroporte de Recueil d’Informations de Guerre Electronique (Airborne Electronic Warfare Information Gathering System) and also is the French word for Opossum, a shy and retiring animal. The updated aircraft was known as the SARIGUE-NG, with the NG standing for Nouvelle Generation or New Generation. Both DC-8s had a SIGINT system from Thompson-CSF, and operated in the Baltic, Mediterranean, French Africa, and during Desert Storm and NATO Kosovo operations.

It had a distinctive sideways looking airborne radar (SLAR) in a "canoe" under the fuselage, as well as large rectangular antenna arrays at each wingtip.

The aircraft was fitted with equipment developed by Thompson-CSF, similar to that installed in the earlirt Transall Gabriels. It is believed that the aircraft operated with a 24-man crew and as well as COMINT and SIGINT duties, it could even intercept mobile phone calls. Operated by the French Air Force on behalf of the armed forces and security services, it was seen in the Baltic, Mediterranean and French Africa, as well as being used in support of coalition operations during the Gulf War and NATO peace keeping operations in Kosovo.

On 19 September 2004, it was reported that in addition to a 50% cost overrun on an electronics upgrade by Thales, the weight of the new upgrade violated safety limits. The French Defence Minister confirmed the Sarigue would be retired because of ‘high operating costs’. An Airbus replacement for the DC-8 was considered and rejected.

=== Germany: aircraft platforms ===
During NATO operations in Bosnia, Germany operated four SIGINT version of the French-German Atlantique patrol aircraft.

Germany has selected a platform for SIGINT, based on the Global 6000.

=== India: aircraft platforms ===
Indian Navy Tupolev Tu-142 and Ilyushin Il-38SD patrol aircraft are known to be equipped with Eagle and Homi SIGINT systems developed as part of "Programme Sangraha" of DRDO. Some Ilyushin Il-38SD were upgraded as part of "Programme Samudrika".

India Air Force Netra AEW&CS platform is equipped with SIGINT equipment developed by DRDO.

=== Israel: aircraft platforms ===
Israel is reported to have converted at least four Boeing 707 aircraft, codenamed Re'em (Antelope) and based at Lod to an electronic warfare role, two for countermeasures and two or more for SIGINT. An indicator of an ELINT role is the presence of a cheek-antenna array externally similar to the AEELS (Automatic ELINT Emitter Locating System) on the RC-135U/V/W. These aging aircraft are due for replacement, probably by Gulfstream G500 executive jets.

The aircraft are known as Re'em (Antelope) and are operated by 134 Tayeset at Lod. Some other IAF 707s are possibly configured for AAR/SIGINT operations. Israel is currently looking for up to nine dual role aircraft to replace their 707s and will purchase a number of Gulfstream G500s.

=== Japan: aircraft platforms ===
The Japan Air Self-Defense Force has 3 YS-11EBs, 2 RC-2 and RQ-4. The Japan Maritime Self-Defense Force has 5EP-3 aircraft and 5OP-3.

According to the intercept, intelligence which were collected from the East China Sea, the South China Sea, Overland Korea, and the Sea of Japan by those aircraft was exchanged for those which were collected by US aircraft.

=== Mexico: aircraft platforms ===
The Mexican Air Force has 2 Embraer P-99s and 1 Embraer R-99A. The R-99A is an Airborne Early Warning & Control aircraft (AWACS) equipped with the Erieye airborne radar from Ericsson AB of Sweden. The P-99 is the maritime patrol version of the R-99. It retains many of the C3I and ELINT capabilities of the R-99B.

=== Russia: aircraft platforms ===
Russian aircraft with SIGINT capability include the Il-20 and Tu-214R.

=== Saudi Arabia: aircraft platforms ===
Several 707 derivatives, originally used as KE-3 tankers, are being converted to two models of SIGINT suites by E Systems. Later versions are on the E-6 modification of the Boeing 707, the E-6 used by the US as a TACAMO command and control aircraft.

According to the US Department of Defense, the Tactical Airborne Surveillance System and upgrades will be installed on Saudi E-3 and E-6 aircraft. The estimated cost is $350 million.

=== Spain: aircraft platforms ===
Spain operates a single 707 variant, modified by Israel and equipped with Israeli and Spanish electronics. As well as an Elta EL/L-8300 SIGINT system, In the baseline version, this multi-operator Elta system contains 0.5 to 18 GHz ELINT (0.03 to 40 GHz as an option), 20 to 1,000 MHz (2 to 1,500 MHz as an option) COMINT, and control and analysis sub-systems.

In addition to the SIGINT payload, the aircraft has a Tamam Stabilised Long Range Observation System (LOROS) high-resolution TV camera and recording systems. The SLOROS is reported to have a range of at least 62 miles (100 km).

The aircraft has been reported around the western edge of North Africa, the Western Sahara and the Mediterranean.

=== Sweden: aircraft platforms ===
The Swedish Air Force operates the S-102B Korpen aircraft which is a modified Gulfstream G-IV business jet.

=== Turkey: aircraft platforms ===
Turkey has 6 C-130B ELINT aircraft,

=== United Kingdom: aircraft platforms ===
The British Nimrod R1 was a variant of the Nimrod maritime patrol aircraft. Its sensors covered the tactical to strategic spectrum. It is reported to have SIGINT suites from Thales. a.k.a. Starwindow, Extract and Tigershark. Starwindow introduced a network of 2 hi-speed and 22 digital pooled receivers, the ability to handle frequency-agile emitters, in-flight analysis capability, real-time preformatted tactical data report generation and active matrix color operator displays. The Extract update increased the platform's level of automation, adding a central database and data fusion capability, while Tigershark was especially tailor-made for COMINT ops in Asia.

The Nimrod was retired from RAF use in 2011,. Under the AirSeeker program 3 Rivet Joint RC-135 signals intelligence aircraft have been purchased for £670 million in 2013. It is reported that one of these is already permanently operating over Iraq as part of the RAF effort to combat Islamic State militants. UK E3D AWACS do not have SIGINT capability.

=== United States: aircraft platforms ===
Some platforms considered strategic, including the P-3 and RC-135 RIVET JOINT aircraft, may be assigned in support of large tactical units. There are both MASINT and SIGINT versions of the RC-135, the best-known SIGINT variant being the RC-135V/W RIVET JOINT.

==== United States: tactical aircraft platforms ====
In the 1950s and 1960s, SIGINT personnel flew aboard Navy EA-3B aircraft. As a result of ASA casualties during ground SIGINT in Vietnam, ASA developed its own fleet of tactical SIGINT aircraft, starting with the U-6 Beaver. The reconnaissance mission for these aircraft was indicated with an "R" prefix, hence RU-6. Beavers, however, had poor capabilities. The RU-1 Otter had more built-in SIGINT equipment, but the first purpose-built Army SIGINT aircraft was the RU-8D Seminole, which had a Doppler navigation system and wing-mounted direction-finding equipment, although SIGINT operations still required much manual work. Some RU-8D aircraft had MASINT sensors for categorizing specific transmissions. Especially with tactical aircraft, there was a gap between the knowledge of SIGINT personnel and the understanding of warfighters. For example, end users often expected a direction-finding fix to be a point, rather than an area of probability.

In 1968, the next tactical improvement was the RU-21 LAFFIN EAGLE and the JU-21 LEFT JAB, the latter being the first with computerized direction finding and data storage. Even more advanced ASA equipment was on P-2V aircraft borrowed from the Navy, and called CEFLIEN LION or CRAZY CAT platforms.

During the Vietnam era, six UH-1 helicopters were converted to SIGINT platforms, called EH-1 LEFT BANK aircraft and operated in direct support of combat aircraft.

US tactical SIGINT aircraft include the EH-60A Quickfix helicopter, which has interception capabilities in the 1.5–150 MHz and direction finding between 20 and 76 MHz. The EH-60L has better communications and ungradability than the A model, with the AN/MSR-3 TACJAM-A system. RC-12 Guardrail aircraft provide a corps-level ESM capability, with the unusual approach of putting all the analysis equipment on the ground, with the RC-12K/N/P/Q aircraft acting purely as intercept and relay platforms. The Guardrail aircraft normally fly in units of three, to get better cross-bearings in direction-finding.

The Navy EA-6B Prowler replaced the USAF EF-111 Raven EW aircraft for all services, and the EA-6B Prowler is being replaced by the EA-18G Growler. All EW aircraft have some ELINT capability if for no other reason than targeting.

Naval MH-60R helicopters have AN/ALQ-210 ESM suites.

==== United States: strategic aircraft platforms ====
The most common aircraft used in a strategic role by US allies are Boeing 707 conversions for the lower-budget, lower-capability installations, and Boeing 767 conversions for the higher-end. Gulfstream executive jets are another platform of interest. The US military is considering, as its aircraft age, replacing with variants on the foreign platforms, often built on US-made aircraft.

Some features are common to multiple countries, such as a pair are two "chipmunk cheek" bulges containing SIGINT antennas. There is a US made set used on the RC-135V and RC-135W Rivet Joint aircraft. A US-made variant, reported to have internal differences, is used by Saudi Arabia. A third variant, with a similar appearance, but of Israeli manufacture, are used by Israel and South Africa. In no case, however, are these the only SIGINT antennas on the aircraft.

Dedicated RC-135 aircraft, operated by the US Air Force, are in a variety of SIGINT and MASINT configurations. An effort is underway to develop a standard RC-135 open architecture, allowing at least some of the aircraft to be quickly reconfigured. RIVET JOINT is the most common SIGINT type.

On the long-range Navy P-3 maritime surveillance aircraft is the AN/ALR-66B(V)3 ELINT/MASINT system targeted against radars. Major improvements are an improved direction-finding antenna and an EP-2060 pulse analyzer. The dedicated SIGINT EP-3 uses a JMOD (Joint Airborne SIGINT Modification) program to a JMOD common configuration (JCC).

Northrop Grumman developed the SIGINT package for the Global Hawk UAV. An upgraded version of the same SIGINT payload is flown on U-2. Boeing has proposed a SIGINT variant of the P-8 multimission maritime patrol aircraft it has under development. Raytheon and Northrop Grumman would be the partners for the actual SIGINT electronics.

Boeing also has built a "Wedgetail 737" for Turkey, and appears to be marketing this as an alternative to the lower-end systems being built for business jets such as the Gulfstream. Australia also has ordered this aircraft.

== Satellite platforms ==
The US launched the first SIGINT satellites, followed by the Soviets. Recently, however, the French have been launching intelligence satellites, on French and Russian rockets, and are exchanging information with the Germans and Italians, both of which are deploying synthetic aperture radar MASINT constellations, with an undefined IMINT or electro-optical MASINT capability on the Italian satellites.

Additional nations have launched IMINT satellites; SIGINT seems to be a lesser priority, with radar MASINT often a higher priority. There are a number of bilateral agreements for satellite cost and intelligence sharing.

=== European military space policy ===
European nations deal with a complex set of issues in developing space-based intelligence systems. Many of the operational and proposed systems have bilateral information sharing agreements, such as France providing ELINT to its radar MASINT SAR and its IMINT partners. SIGINT capability, however, is fairly rare, with France in the Western European lead.

Quite a number of issues are driving European needs for intelligence policy. During the 1991 Gulf War, France's dependence on US assets convince it that it needed its own, or at least European, space-based intelligence. Balkan operations and both dependence on US assets, and exclusion from certain information, further pushed the desire, although the topmost levels of government had not yet been convinced.

In 1998, a British-French meeting in St. Malo, France, produced a declaration that the EU needed "a capacity for analysis of situations, sources of intelligence, and a capability for relevant strategic planning (emphasis added). This was a major change in British policy toward the EU, in that Britain had wanted the EU to stay out of defense issues, leaving them to NATO. At a 1999 meeting in Cologne, Germany, while Kosovo was being bombed by NATO, the EU leadership repeated the St. Malo declaration, including having EU military forces not dependent on NATO. They also called for "the reinforcement of our capabilities in the field of intelligence/".

==== WEU/EU military force ====
At a Helsinki meeting in December 1999 and a follow-up meeting in Sintra, Portugal in February 2000, there was agreement on a 15 brigade multinational corps with air and naval support, ready by 2003. European defense policy called for three new bodies that would need intelligence support: a Political and Security Committee composed of ambassadors with an advisory role to the EU Council of Ministers, a Military Committee of senior officers, and a Multinational Planning Staff. There was additional consensus on merging the WEU into the EU

WEU has concentrated on IMINT, which is increasingly less sensitive than other intelligence disciplines due to the availability of commercial imagery. The WEY headquarters does have an Intelligence Section that produces finished intelligence for the member states, within the capabilities of a staff of six.

==== European Union Satellite Centre ====
In May 1991, however, the WEU ministers agreed to create the European Union Satellite Centre in Torrejón de Ardoz, which became a permanent center in May 1995. The Center neither owns nor operates any satellites, but buys and analyzes commercial imagery. This is not wildly dissimilar to the way the US has the National Reconnaissance Office to launch and operate satellites, with the National Geospatial-Intelligence Agency (NGA) analyzing the imagery. It should be stressed that the Torrejon center deals only with IMINT and possibly SAR and multispectral MASINT. It does not receive information directly from satellites, but from their operators.

The center contributed to planning with reference to situations in the Balkans and Africa in the mid-1990s. Up to May 13, 1997, the center was only allowed to study an area after the WEU council agreed that an area was in crisis. After that date, they received a "general surveillance mission" and permission to build databases.

Bosnian operations continued to point out dependency on the US for C4I. The balance between building European capability without duplicating NATO remained an issue German SIGINT units that were part of the French-led Multinational Division (MND) in Bosnia provided intelligence to the division-level French headquarters.

==== Sharing the more sensitive disciplines ====
The biggest problem in joint intelligence is sharing, especially the now more-sensitive SIGINT, HUMINT, and MASINT. The next largest is damage to bilateral relationships, especially with the US. Not all EU nations have the traditional French priority for autonomy. It is not clear how far other European nations, especially the six that are in the NATO but not the EU, are willing to cooperate. Turkey suggested that if it cannot be involved in EU policy, it might work to block EU access to NATO. Norway also expressed concern over the St. Malo declaration, and in February 2000, British officials spoke about a proposal that the EU take on collective defense, that still being a NATO responsibility.

==== European Space Council and current concerns ====
In 2004, the European Space Council was formed, although it is still struggling with dual-use issues, and the relationships with NATO and US policy. Complicating matters is that the European Space Agency (ESA) is new in non-civilian applications.

Should Europe proceed on its security objective, a policy needs to be defined that will not jeopardize the peaceful application. This needs to happen without creating a false firewall with military activities, as the US created NASA as an ostensibly civilian-only organization, deliberately picking a civilian, Neil Armstrong to put the first footprint on the Moon.

China's anti-satellite (ASAT) test in 2007 concerned ESA, as debris from the test has produced numerous near-misses of other satellites. ESA also suggested it might work on a data relay satellite such as TDRSS, which is dual-use. Some of its present communications projects are dual use.

==== Next generation ====
A pointer to the direction is whether there will be consensus on a next-generation European system of IMINT and radar MASINT satellites. A proposal in process is to generate the Multinational Space-based Imagery System for Surveillance, Reconnaissance, and Observation (MUSIS). The participants are Belgium, France, Germany, Greece, Italy and Spain. EADS Astrium and Thales Alenia Space are competing, under the direction of the French defense procurement agency, DGA. This system could be operational somewhere around 2015–2017, around the time that the French Helios and joint French-Italian Pleiades IMINT satellites need replacement. The German SAR Lupe and Italian CosmoSkyMed radar satellites will last up to 2017 or 2018.

=== Belgium: satellite platforms ===
Belgium is a financial partner in the French Helios 2 IMINT satellite system. French Essaim ELINT satellites were launched with Helios 2A. It has not been announced if Spain, as a Helios 2 partner, will have access to French Essaim ELINT.

Belgium is a MUSIS partner, which should be considered in assessing the potential of information sharing among the partners.

=== France: satellite platforms ===
John Pike states the Socialist government, elected in May 1981 and led President François Mitterrand were unknown at the time of his election in May 1981 marked the attempt to put SDECE under civilian control. In June 1981, Stone Marion, a civilian who was the former Director of the Paris Airport, was named to the head of the SDECE but met with opposition, as a socialist and civilian, from inside SDECE.

France and Britain had both been facing both the desirability and cost of intelligence satellites independent of the US. In the mid-1980s, with the development of the Ariane launcher and its associated large launch complex in French Guiana, the French liked the idea of such independence. Planning started on French IMINT satellites called Helios, a radar imaging satellite called Osiris and then Horus, and a SIGINT satellite to be called Zenon when operational. France would launch technology demonstrators before a fully operational SIGINT satellite. France began its intelligence satellite program with Helios IMINT satellites, although they also planned on Horus (first called Osiris) radar MASINT and Zenon ELINT platforms.

France, still desiring to have three different space-based intelligence systems (IMINT, radar surveillance, SIGINT), had to face extremely high costs. In 1994–1995, French legislators tried to reduce some of these plans. In response, the French government sought Italian and Spanish funding in, and cooperation with, the HELIOS 1 program. They also sought German involvement in Helios 2.

Two first-generation Helios satellites, with 1-meter optical imaging resolution and no infrared capability, were launched in 1995 and 1999. Helios 1 was an Italian-Spanish. Helios 2 is a French–Belgian–Spanish partnership.

On 18 December 2004, Helios 2A, built by EADS-Astrium for the French Space Agency (CNES), was launched into a Sun-synchronous polar orbit at an altitude of about 680 kilometers. There it will serve the French defense ministry, as well as cooperating European countries. Helios 2B is scheduled for launch in 2008.

The same launcher carried French and Spanish scientific satellites and four Essaim ("Swarm") experimental ELINT satellites.

Sources in the French procurement agency, DGA, confirmed Essaim, a system of ground station and satellite constellation, is working well.

DGA, the French military procurement agency, announced that the constellation of four Essaim ELINT satellites launched with Helios 2A on 18 December 2004 would begin operations in May 2005. Essaims operate in a linked system of three active satellites with an in-orbit spare. There is one active earth station, with two due to follow.

Essaim is a third-generation technology demonstrator with some operational capability. A radio propagation experiment, S80-T, was launched in 1992, as a predecessor of the ELINT experiments. The first generation was Cerise, launched in 1995 and damaged in 1996 by a collision with the French SPOT-1 earth resource observing satellite. Clementine, the second generation, was launched in 1999.

Some French defense officials have criticized the DGA for insisting on a third in-orbit demonstrator program after a decade of initial validation with the previous satellites. DGA officials note that Essaim has greater capacity than its predecessors and will provide some operational data. They say Essaim is designed to maintain French expertise long enough to persuade other European governments to join in an operational eavesdropping effort, which France alone cannot afford.

In a Ministère de la Défense 12/18/2004 statement, France announced that Helios 2A is part of an exchange program planned with the SAR-Lupe and Italian COSMO-SKYMED systems, under development respectively in Germany and Italy.

France is also developing the new generation PLEIADES two-satellite optical dual-use (military-civilian) system. PLEIADES is intended to succeed France's SPOT system is considered part of the Franco-Italian ORFEO (Optical and Radar Federated Earth Observation) programme, being due for launch around 2008–10. France is a MUSIS partner, which should be considered in assessing the potential of information sharing among the partners.

=== Germany: satellite platforms ===
Germany's SAR Lupe is a constellation of five X-band SAR satellites in three polar orbits. Following the first successful launch on December 19, 2006, Germany, using a Russian booster, launched the second satellite in its planned five-satellite SAR-Lupe synthetic aperture radar constellation on July 2, 2007, the third on November 1, 2007, the fourth on March 27, 2008, and the last one on July 22, 2008. The system achieved full operational readiness with the launch of the last satellite.

SAR is usually considered a MASINT sensor, but the significance here is that Germany obtains access to French satellite ELINT. In 2021/22 Germany will launch the first SARah satellite, which is the successor to SAR LUPE. Also the Bundesnachrichtendienst, Germany's foreign intelligence service, will receive an optical satellite system consisting of three satellites from 2022 onwards. The system is called "GEORG" ("Geheimes Elektro-Optisches Reconnaissance System Germany")

Germany is a MUSIS partner, which should be considered in assessing the potential of information sharing among the partners.

=== Greece: satellite platforms ===
Greece is a MUSIS partner, which should be considered in assessing the potential of information sharing among the partners.

=== India: satellite platforms ===
EMISAT is an Indian reconnaissance satellite under DRDO's project Kautilya which is meant to provide space-based electronic intelligence or ELINT.

=== Italy: satellite platforms ===
The first CosmoSkyMed (Constellation of small Satellites for Mediterranean basin Observation) went into orbit in June 2007. The second should be launched in late 2007, and the remaining two in 2008–9. According to a Thales executive, Giorgio Piemontese, a followon needs to be planned soon to avoid a gap.

Italy and France are cooperating on the deployment of the dual-use Orfeo civilian and military satellite system.

Orfeo is a dual-use (civilian and military) earth observation satellite network developed jointly between France and Italy. Italy is developing the Cosmo-Skymed X-band polarimetric SAR, to fly on two of the satellites. The other two will have complementary French electro-optical payloads. The second Orfeo is scheduled to launch in early 2008.

While this is not an explicit SIGINT system, the French-Italian cooperation may suggest that Italy can get data from the French Essaim ELINT microsatellites.

Italy plains joint development, with France, of the ORFEO (Optical and Radar Federated Earth Observation) system, to be launched in 2008–10. Italy is a MUSIS partner, which should be considered in assessing the potential of information sharing among the partners.

=== Russia: satellite platforms ===
The USSR appears to have emphasized ELINT more than COMINT in their space-based SIGINT program. After proof-of-concept of an ELINT payload on the first-generation IMINT satellites, the Tselina program was started in 1964, and the first successful launch of the simpler, lower-sensitivity Tselina O was in 1967. The more complex Tselina D first flew in 1970, a more complex Tselina D spacecraft started flying. Both versions flew until 1984, when the Tselina D was set up in a constellation of 6 satellites.

Both Tselina O and D versions were flying side by side until 1984, when Tselina O subsystem was abandoned and its functions integrated into those conducted by the Tselina D spacecraft. As the Western observers noted, the Tselina D spacecraft, known in the West as the "heavy ELINT," would orbit the Earth in groups of six satellites spread 60 degrees apart in their orbits.

Requirements for the Tselina-2 series were issued in 1974, with a first test launch scheduled for 1980 and full operational capability in 1982. Requirements grew until the Tselina-2 was too heavy for the Tsyklon-3 booster, and the program was switched to the Zenit booster in development. With the capacity of the Zenit, additional capabilities were added, including telemetry through relay satellites. An interesting but poorly understood feature of the Tselina-2 system is that the satellites are placed into orbits that interact strongly with features of the Earth's gravitational field ("14th order harmonics") in such a way that the natural orbital decay caused by atmospheric drag is inhibited for long periods of time.

On April 27, 1979, the Military Industrial Commission, VPK, officially approved the Zenit as a launcher for the Tselina-2 satellite. The VPK scheduled the beginning of flight tests for the 2nd quarter of 1981. The first Tselina-2 blasted off in September 1984 under official name Cosmos 1603 and declared operational in 1988.

Tselina-2 system was declared operational in December 1988, which was confirmed by a government decree issued in December 1990. The most recent launch was on June 29, 2007, named Cosmos-2428. It is believed that was the last Tselina-2, with a next generation coming.

According to, the Tselina-2 is intended for land targets, while the US-PU EORSAT is intended for naval ELINT. EORSAT is passive, not to be confused with the nuclear-powered radar ocean surveillance satellites (RORSAT), no longer operational. A full constellation of US-PU includes 3–4 spacecraft in LEO of 400 km, but not more than one has been in orbit since 2004, along with two Tselina-2s. A new generation of ELINT satellites, possibly combining the land and sea missions, may be in development.

=== Spain: satellite platforms ===
Spain is a financial partner in the French Helios 2 IMINT satellite system. Spain plans a dual-use optical and radar system. Due to the arrangement between France and Germany to exchange Helios 2 and SAR Lupe imagery, excluding the non-French partners in Helios. It has not been announced if Spain, as a Helios 2 partner, will have access to French Essaim ELINT. Spain is a MUSIS partner, which should be considered in assessing the potential of information sharing among the partners.

=== United States: satellite platforms ===
The first US SIGINT satellites, Galactic Radiation and Background (GRAB) were launched in 1960 by the Naval Research Laboratory, but the existence of the program was highly classified. The name of the program was changed to Poppy (satellite) after the National Reconnaissance Office was created in 1962.

While there had been considerable resistance, in the 1970s, to admitting to "the fact of" satellite IMINT, there was considerably more sensitivity to admitting even to "the fact of" US satellite SIGINT. The US decided to admit to using satellites for SIGINT and MASINT in 1996.

US SIGINT satellites have included the Canyon series Rhyolite/Aquacade series, succeeded by the Vortex/Magnum/Orion and Mentor. Where the preceding satellites were in close to geosynchronous orbit, Jumpseat /Trumpet satellites were in Moliyna orbits giving better polar coverage.

From 1972 to 1989, low earth orbit SIGINT satellites were launched only as secondary payloads with KH-9 and KH-11 IMINT satellites. They were code-named after female sex symbols, such as Raquel, Farrah, Bridget and Marilyn.

Four geosychronous Rhyolite satellites were launched in the seventies, with COMINT and TELINT missions. After having the name compromised when Christopher Boyce sold information to the Soviets, the code name was changed to Aquacade.

In the late seventies, another class of geosynchronous SIGINT satellites, first called Chalet and renamed Vortex after the code name was compromised. After the loss of Iranian monitoring stations, these satellites were also given a TELINT capability.

Jumpseat ELINT satellites, using a Moliyna orbit, started launching in 1975.

MAGNUM geosynchronous SIGINT satellites were first launched from the Space Shuttle in 1985. These were believed to be more sensitive and perhaps stealthier than Rhyolite/Aquacade.

== See also ==
- Signals intelligence
- Signals intelligence by alliances, nations and industries
- Signals intelligence in modern history
- Intelligence cycle management
