= Signals intelligence by alliances, nations and industries =

Signals intelligence by alliances, nations and industries comprises signals intelligence (SIGINT) gathering activities by national and non-national entities; these entities are commonly responsible for communications security (COMSEC) as well.

Many US and allied SIGINT activities are considered Sensitive Compartmented Information (SCI) and carry the special security marking "HANDLE THROUGH COMINT CHANNELS ONLY", which is abbreviated as the suffix CCO to the security classification. SECRET SIGINT material would be marked (S-CCO). For exceptionally sensitive TOP SECRET material, there may be an additional codeword, such as (TS-CCO-RABID).

== UKUSA Agreement ==
SIGINT and security procedures are closely coordinated under what is called the UKUSA Community, which includes Australia, Canada, New Zealand, the United Kingdom, and the United States cooperating in a major SIGINT activity codenamed ECHELON. Of the UKUSA partners, NSA is the US element, Britain's is the Government Communications Headquarters (GCHQ), Canada's is the Communications Security Establishment and a few other small groups, Australia's is the Australian Signals Directorate, and New Zealand's is the Government Communications Security Bureau.

== ECHELON ==
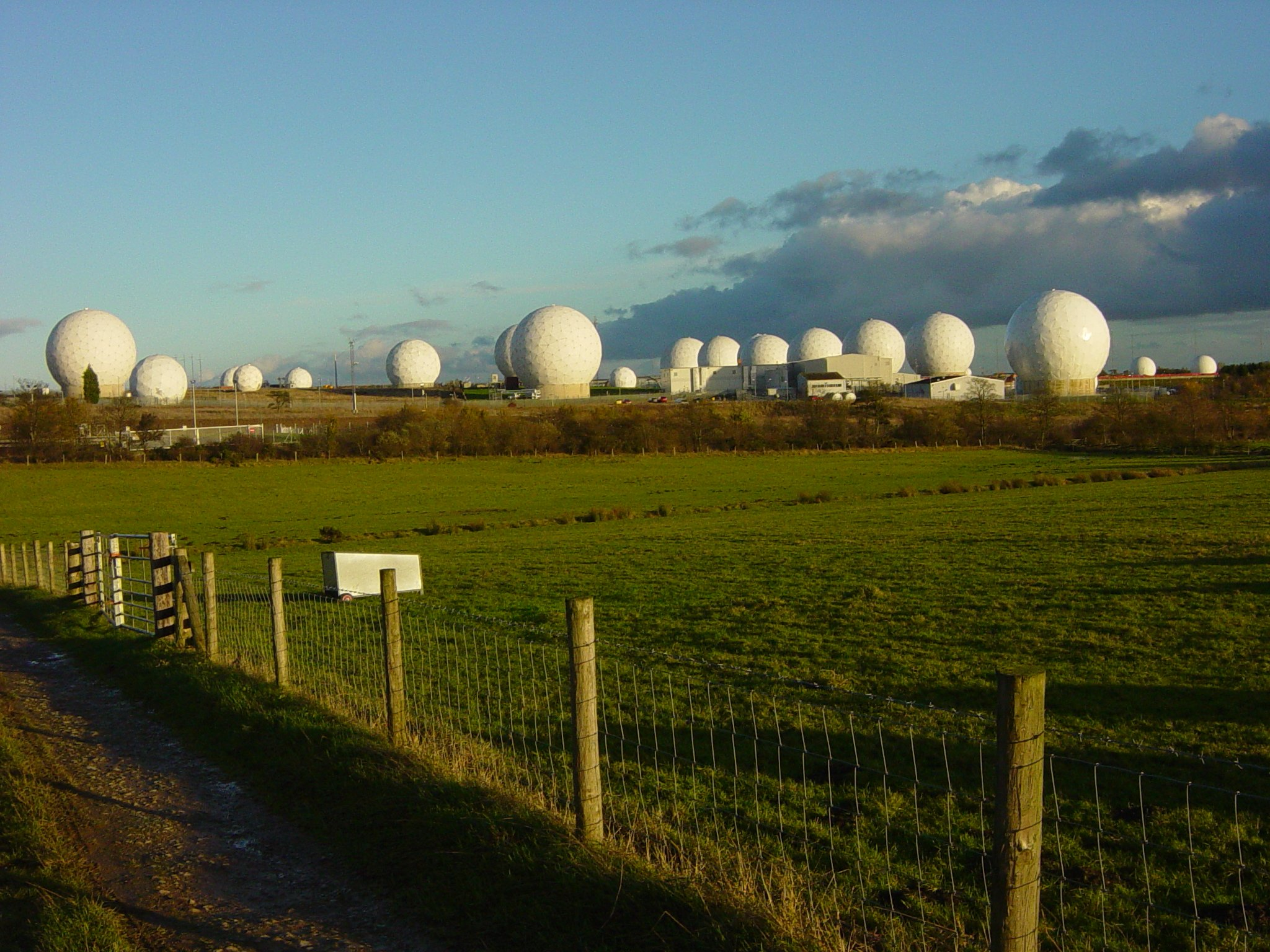
RAF Menwith Hill, a large ECHELON site in the United Kingdom.

It is fair to say that there is something called ECHELON, and it is very large. There is no unclassified definition of what it really does, and there are conflicting unofficial reports on its capabilities and operations. Duncan Campbell is the source of much information, but many of his claims have been challenged by independent sources. It is a 2000 report, and his claims that NSA has published no details of its operations is not the case in 2007. Another extensive report is that of the European Parliament in 2001. Campbell himself refined his definitions a year later. His "strict" definition of ECHELON is that it is a satellite interception component of the partners of the UKUSA Agreement. Even among the UKUSA members, according to Campbell, there may be other satellite interception stations not called ECHELON, probably in Australia and possibly in Great Britain.

It is generally accepted that ECHELON is a cooperative system, principally among the UKUSA Agreement partners, to intercept satellite, microwave, and other communications around the world, searching for information of interest to its members. The geographic distribution of the members allows much more effective worldwide coverage. This article does not replace the separate ECHELON Wikipedia article, but will complement it.

Campbell cites Jeffrey Richelson as defining, in the 4th edition of The American Intelligence Establishment, an "official" list of "third party" participants in ECHELON (or perhaps the UKUSA SIGINT alliance) as Norway, Denmark, Germany, Italy, Greece, Turkey, Austria, Japan, South Korea, and Thailand. Campbell further indicated that US payments to Norway and Denmark were stopped in 1992, and those countries intended to do their own satellite interception.

There are also conflicting reports about the relationship, if any, between ECHELON and US government warrantless monitoring wanted by the George W. Bush administration. Many reports focus on ECHELON's capability to intercept signals transmitted through free space, such as microwave and communications satellites. Given that much of the world's communications have moved to optical fiber cables, which are difficult but not impossible to intercept.

Much ECHELON specification is based on clues, such as noting the geographic location of various large satellite receiving antennas, then plotting the vertical and horizontal coordinates of the parabolic "dish" of the antenna. These can be correlated with the known positions of communications satellites to project that the antenna is intended to receive the signals of a particular satellite.

Other countries may be cooperating with the UKUSA countries, including Ireland and Switzerland. There are also conflicting reports about France cooperating with ECHELON, but also operating an independent capability.

=== Confirmation of ECHELON ===
Two internal NSA newsletters from January 2011 and July 2012, published as part of the Snowden-revelations by the website The Intercept on August 3, 2015, for the first time confirmed that NSA used the codeword ECHELON and provided some details about the scope of the program: ECHELON was part of an umbrella program codenamed FROSTING, which was established by the NSA in 1966 to collect and process data from communications satellites. FROSTING had two sub-programs:

- TRANSIENT: for intercepting of Soviet satellites
- ECHELON: for intercepting of Intelsat satellites

A first satellite ground station for the ECHELON collection program was built in 1971 at a military firing and training center near Yakima, Washington. The facility, which was codenamed JACKKNIFE, became fully operational in May 1973 and was connected with NSA headquarters at Fort Meade by a 75-baud secure teletype orderwire channel.

== NATO ==
Communications and data exchange electronics are intended to be interoperable among NATO members, although not all countries will share sensitive data. Tactical information usually will be shared.

== ASEAN and related groups ==
The Association of Southeast Asian Nations (ASEAN) original member states consisting of Indonesia, Malaysia, the Philippines, Singapore, and Thailand. Where the collective fear of communism had paved the way for the International Intelligence Cooperation (IIC) and subsequent structures found within the organization. After the end of the Cold War, former Soviet-align nations joining would shift the focus of the IIC from an anti-communist role to a counter-terrorism role. The subsequent nations include Brunei, Laos, Vietnam, Cambodia, Myanmar, which joined long before the creation of the IIC

Given Singapore's small but potent military, it made basing arrangements in Singapore, in Malaysia and the Philippines. Thailand and Malaysia have a good record working together against the Communist Party of Malaysia.

For some years, the ASEAN countries have held annual intelligence summits. It is unclear, however, if intelligence ties preceded or followed the development of military relationships. The author poses the challenge, "Do arrangements such as ECHELON exist outside the relationships between "great" powers? Literature shows that broad relationships exist among regional powers for various reasons. In the case of ASEAN, states brought together to fight communist insurgency find that they can maximize security by cooperating in covert operations and intelligence sharing."

Technology has accelerated ASEAN intelligence cooperation. For example, Malaysia and Singapore jointly monitor the South China Sea electronically. It is reasonable to assume that the less sensitive aspects of SIGINT, such as Direction finding are part of that surveillance. Other sources include the Five Power Defence Arrangements (FPDA) of Australia, Great Britain, New Zealand, Singapore and Malaysia, which includes three members of the UKUSA alliance with strong national SIGINT organizations.

Spurred by terrorism concerns, the ASEAN states, in May 2002, agreed on an Action Plan that provided for enhanced cooperation in intelligence sharing and coordination of anti-terror laws. In August 2002, ASEAN and the United States issued a “Joint Declaration . . . to Combat International Terrorism," which was followed by an ASEAN Regional Forum (ARF) meeting on terrorism, to be jointly sponsored by Malaysia in the US. The US proposed that a regional counterterrorism training center be established in Malaysia. Accompanying the Anti-Terrorism Center is an intelligence-sharing agreement among Indonesia, the Philippines, Malaysia, Cambodia, and Thailand, a first meeting of which was held in Manila in January 2003. An obvious question, without a simple answer, is how much SIGINT capabilities these countries have.

Some of these countries are reluctant to get too close to the US, involving nationalist issues in the Philippines and Islamic parties in Malaysia and Indonesia. Singapore, among the regional nations, seems most comfortable in exchanging intelligence information with the US, especially receiving SIGINT in return for HUMINT. Singapore has established sharing between the US PACOM Joint Intelligence Center and Singapore's Joint Counterterrorism Center, and Singapore also is leading in accepting US goals for maritime security, with a Strategic Goods Control law in January 2003. That law made Singapore the first major port to meet US homeland security rules for cargo. Singapore wants more US X-ray equipment, and possibly MASINT sensors.

US relations to ASEAN or other groups may be more domestically acceptable, in countries suspicious of the US, than bilateral arrangements. There are obvious reasons for regional nations wanting US intelligence support, including SIGINT. Nevertheless, the eagerness of the US to help against Islamic groups strikes at local sensitivities.

== Other coalitions ==
UN and other, often ad hoc international coalitions have no predefined SIGINT interoperability; establishing even basic communications interoperabilities is one of the first and most urgent tasks of any coalition.

== National SIGINT ==
=== Australia ===
Australia's main organization is in the Australian Signals Directorate. It operates collection stations for multilateral and national use. Australia has systems interoperable with UKUSA, and ECHELON.

=== Canada ===
Canada has the Communications Security Establishment and several other groups, especially military tactical groups. Canada has systems interoperable with NATO nations, UKUSA, and ECHELON.

=== China ===
China's main SIGINT effort is in the Technical Department, or Third Department of the General Staff Department of the Central Military Commission, with additional capabilities, primarily domestic, in the Ministry of State Security (MSS). SIGINT stations, therefore, are scattered through the country, for domestic as well as international interception. Prof. Desmond Ball, of the Australian National University, described the largest stations as

- the main Technical Department SIGINT net control station on the northwest outskirts of Beijing
- large complex near Lake Kinghathu in the extreme northeast corner of China

Some Western analyses of the third department claim it maintains a staff of more than 130,000, though this figure cannot be independently confirmed.

=== Cuba ===
While Cuba had traditionally been a Soviet client, it both has been developing indigenous capabilities, including equipment design and manufacture, as well as having Chinese-operated stations on its soil. Within the Cuban intelligence ministry, a Counter-Electronic Warfare Department was established in 1997, at the same level as the Technical Department and the Foreign Intelligence Department. In 1992, a tactically oriented Counter-Electronic Warfare Department was created. The national intelligence organization also runs electronic warfare and SIGINT for the Air Force and Navy.

Russia and China, at various times, have operated or are operating intercept stations in Cuba, as well as Cuban-operated facilities. The largest and best-known, Lourdes SIGINT Station, was shut down by Russia in 2001, along with the Russian station at Cam Ranh Bay, Vietnam. Four ground stations (q.v.) are in Cuba, two of which are operated by China.

=== Denmark ===
Denmark is a NATO member and thus has access to a wide range of SIGINT equipment and techniques. A journal article (information from abstract on Ingentaconnect) from 2001 states that all four countries of Scandinavia, including NATO members Denmark and Norway, and non-aligned Sweden and Finland, cooperated in collecting SIGINT on the Soviet Union and Eastern Europe. Norway and Denmark did not allow American personnel in their intercept centers, but did receive American financial and technical help. The author suggests Sweden, while non-aligned, cooperated with US and UK intelligence in the early stages, and possibly later, in the Cold War.

The Danish Sigint service, Forsvarets Central Radio, was also active at the same time, and fed the U.S. data from 8 stations located from Greenland to Bornholm. US funds from the 1950 agreement were cut off, to Norway and Denmark, in 1992, and those two countries planned to do their own satellite interception. The Pusher HF/DF system used by Denmark is not designed for satellite but for terrestrial interception; it is not clear what, if any, effect that the reported US funds cutoff had on the Pusher system output.

The Danish periodical, Ekstra Bladet, on September 18, 1999, published an article titled "WHERE THE SPIES ARE LISTENING—Take a walk with us through the most secretive secrets of the FE (the Intelligence Agency of the Danish Armed Forces). The authors describe a visit to an apparent SIGINT collection facility, called Sandagergård, at Aflandshage south of Copenhagen. Sandagergård is operated by the Danish intelligence agency. According to the article, Denmark has participated, since 1947, in ECHELON. Denmark participates in the global surveillance system known today as UKUSA, and known in the press as Echelon. The agreement was reached with Cdr. P .A. Mørch, then second in command of FE, with the American Office of Strategic Services (OSS), predecessor of the Central Intelligence Agency (CIA). The CIA was formed by the National Security Act of 1947, and, by 1947, the OSS had been dissolved although there were interim agencies that might have negotiated an agreement.

The agreement was that the Americans were to supply the equipment free of charge. Denmark's payment was to allow a large American ear to listen in on everything that was intercepted by Denmark's FE agents. In 1950, the agreement was formalized by Commander Finn Haugsted and Minister of Defense Rasmus 'Jetfighter' Hansen. The article cites Cdr. Mørch's memoirs as the source, and says he refers to the Danish SIGINT organization as 'the Social Democrat's Child'. Under the agreement, the US was to supply the technical equipment, while Denmark would supply the land and staff.

In 1999, however, Frank Jensen, the Social Democratic Minister of Justice and former Minister of Research (responsible for Denmark's telecommunications) denied knowledge of ECHELON.

When the journalists visited the Sandagergård facility, they saw a Pusher HF/DF system, which is a smaller version of the Wullenweber intercept & direction-finding antenna, and two radomes. Discarded paper and packing materials identified shipments of products from IBM, Digital Equipment Corporation, Microsoft and Unisys. They also identified a SIGINT post at Skibsbylejren near Hjørring.

This report clearly shows that Denmark operates SIGINT equipment. It cannot be determined, from this information alone, if the operation is for Danish use only, in support of NATO, or indeed part of ECHELON. Denmark hosts the regional NATO command for the Baltic Approaches (BALTAP) from a base at Karup.

In September 1999, Minister for Defense Hans Hækkerup said Denmark cooperates with other countries on surveillance, but would not identify the countries or agencies. According to the authors, the US 650th MI Group is the sole point of contact to NATO.

=== Finland ===
During the Soviet era, Finland, while ostensibly neutral, was reported to be cooperating with the other Scandinavian countries in obtaining SIGINT on the Soviet Union and Eastern Europe. The Finnish Defence Intelligence Agency is responsible for SIGINT in addition to geospatial (GEOINT) and imagery intelligence (IMINT).

=== France ===
The French intelligence agency DGSE has responsibility for national-level SIGINT, including a ship and the currently inactive aircraft. There are multiple land-based sites.

A French Army publications mentions Emeraude as an apparently tactical SIGINT "listening module". Press reports suggest there is another system, nicknamed Frenchelon in the press, run by DGSE and possibly providing economic intelligence to French industry.

=== Germany ===
After the end of the Cold War, Germany treated military-related SIGINT differently from other nations, making it a part of the defense-wide electronic warfare organization rather than an intelligence organization. The first unit was set up in Osnabruck in 1957. In 1959, German and Dutch SIGINT personnel met to establish a long-standing, especially close cooperation. Today Germany operates many different SIGINT platforms.

=== Greece ===
Greece's main SIGINT organization is Branch E of the national (civilian) intelligence service, Ethniki ypiresia pliroforion (EYP). Branch E reports to the Deputy Director General A, who reports to the Director General.

The military has limited tactical capabilities, interoperable with NATO. A 12-day major exercise in Greece, Trial Spartan Hammer (TSH) ‘06, involved 2,000 personnel from 14 NATO countries and 15 NATO agencies, including the SIGINT & ESM working group (SEWG) under the NATO Joint Intelligence, Surveillance, and Reconnaissance Capability Group. It was the second NATO joint Signal Intelligence/Electronic Warfare (SIGINT/EW) demonstration. Canadian Forces involved included the Electronic Warfare Centre (CFEWC), HMCS Iroquois, 772 EW Squadron, the Joint Intelligence Fusion Capability and the Directorate of Space Development.

=== Hungary ===
Hungary's signals intelligence agency is called "Nemzetbiztonsági Szakszolgálat" (National Security Special Service). It is under the control of the Minister for the Interior and provides signals intelligence services to the police, the national intelligence service, the counter-intelligence service, the military national security service and the prosecutors' offices.

=== India ===
India implements AWACS and SIGINT using the Israeli Aircraft Industries Phalcon, which is installed in Russian Ilyushin Il-76 aircraft, the same aircraft used for Russia's own A-50 AWACS. India also uses homegrown AWACS, the DRDO Airborne Early Warning and Control System (AEW&CS) which uses Embraer ERJ-145 aircraft as platform.

Multiple agencies are involved in the SIGINT and allied roles(such as ELINT, TELINT etc.) Those involved with Defence Intelligence report to the Ministry of Defence and agencies involved with external intelligence report to the Secretary(R&AW).

=== Ireland ===
The Irish Defence Forces Communications and Information Services Corps (CIS) and Directorate of Military Intelligence are responsible for SIGINT and cyber surveillance in Ireland, supported by the Garda Síochána (Irish National Police) Crime & Security Branch (CSB). The Republic of Ireland operates a policy of military neutrality. However, it is understood that the military and police intelligence agencies in Ireland cooperate with the ECHELON network, sharing information and receiving information in return.

=== Israel ===
SIGINT operations in Israel are run by Unit 8200, which sits under the command of the Israeli Intelligence Corps.

=== Japan ===
In the 1980s, the former Defense Agency had several intelligence divisions with different duties. Annex Chamber (or Special Annex), Second Intelligence Division, Ground Staff Office was one of the predecessor organizations of DIH. They collected signals from the Sino–Soviet border conflict of 1969 and the Soviet Afghan war of 1979. They were also involved in intercepting communications that led to and after the shooting of Korean Air Lines Flight 007 through the Wakkanai Station.

In 1997, Japan created its first post-WWII major intelligence organization, the Defense Intelligence Headquarters (DIH).

Its SIGINT Division is the largest in the organization, with a Ground Self Defense Force unit in Ichigawa, targeting China, North Korea and Russia. The Division also has two Wullenweber intercept and direction finding, as well as offices in Kobunato (in Niigata Prefecture), Ooi (in Saitama Prefecture), Tachiarai (in Fukuoka Prefecture), and Kikaijima (in Kagoshima Prefecture). The successful interception of North Korean communications by Kikaijima station later led to a naval shootout between ships of the Japan Coast Guard and a suspected North Korean spy boat in 2001 near the island of Amami-Ōshima before the latter had been destroyed. And there are the satellite communications interception stations in Ooi (in Saitama Prefecture), Tachiarai (in Fukuoka Prefecture) and Higashi Chitose( in Hokkaido), reportedly have monitoring communications from transiting satellites, as part of a program codenamed MALLARD. The program reportedly intercepts more than 12 million Internet communications per day.

The Air Self-Defense Force is replacing its YS-11EBs with the new RC-2 electronic intelligence gathering aircraft and also owns Global Hawks. The Maritime Self-Defense Force has five EP-3C aircraft.

=== Jordan ===
Beginning in the 1990s, and according to William Arkin with a declaration of Jordan as a combat zone for U.S. personnel on September 19, 2001, there has been increasing intelligence cooperation between the US and Jordan. Arkin states there are permanent US SIGINT ground stations now in Jordan.

=== New Zealand ===
The Government Communications Security Bureau (GCSB) is responsible for signals intelligence and was established in 1977, with responsibility for Communications and Technical Security as well as SIGINT. Computer security (COMSEC) responsibilities were added later.

Predecessor organizations included the New Zealand Communications Security Committee (NZCSC), created after WWII, from the Prime Minister's Department, and the Ministries of Foreign Affairs and Defence. While New Zealand had SIGINT functions before WWII, in 1955, the function was organized into the New Zealand Combined Signals Organisation (NZCSO), under the Deputy Chief of Naval Staff.

The technology security (TECSEC) function of the Government, which essentially involves the provision of protection from eavesdropping or "bugging", was undertaken by the New Zealand Security Intelligence Service and the Ministry of Defence, prior to the formation of the GCSB. Those capabilities were however limited, and the role was passed to GCSB upon its formation.

During the mid-1970s (74–76) two separate reviews were conducted into the SIGINT and COMSEC activities of the New Zealand Government. One of the aims of the COMSEC study was to investigate the possibility of establishing vital operating standards and a capability to produce national cryptographic key material.

Formally established on 1 September 1977, the GCSB was located within the Ministry of Defence for reasons of cover. "The fact of" GCSB was disclosed, in 1980, to the Cabinet and Opposition Leader, but with SIGINT functions excluded. Only in 1984 was the SIGINT function of GCSB announced by the Prime Minister. In 1982, the HF radio interception and Direction finding station at Tangimoana was opened.

After a number of reviews in the late 1980s, GCSB was separated from the Defence Ministry, reporting directly to the Prime Minister in 1989. This act coincided with the creation of the satellite communications interception station at Waihopai, near Blenheim.

According to Nicky Hager, New Zealand is part of ECHELON via the UKUSA Agreement.

=== Norway ===
Norway, a NATO member, was reported to be cooperating with the other Scandinavian countries in obtaining SIGINT on the Soviet Union and Eastern Europe. According to Campbell, there were two bilateral agreements for a SIGINT alliance between Norway in the US, one in 1954 and the next in 1979. US funding, however, ceased in 1992, and Campbell said that the Norwegians planned to begin their own satellite interception.

=== Russia ===
Russia's approximate counterpart to NSA is the FSO's Special Communications Service of Russia, the successor of FAPSI. Additional capabilities are in the GRU Sixth Directorate and with cooperation with the Communications Security Headquarters of the Federal Security Service (FSB).

There was an FSO-GRU surveillance facility at the People's Democratic Republic of Yemen’s Ras Karma military airbase, near QaDub on Socotra Island, opposite to the coast of Somalia at the mouth of the Gulf of Aden in the Indian Ocean. This facility allows intercept of signals from Afghanistan and Diego Garcia. Tupolev Tu-142M-Z ‘Bear,’ Beriev A-50 ‘Mainstay’ and IL-38 ‘May’ surveillance aircraft operate from bases in Syria, South Yemen, and Cuba. Ports also support Russian SIGINT "trawlers", or, more correctly, small intelligence collection vessels.

Russia had operated large SIGINT stations in Cuba and Vietnam until 2001, but the chief of the General Staff, Anatoly Kvashnin, while the station in Lourdes, Cuba had been vital during the cold war "Now, the military-political situation has changed and there has been a qualitative leap in military equipment. With that money we can buy and launch 20 communication, intelligence and information satellites, and buy up to 100 sophisticated radars," Given US SIGINT satellite launches typically are quoted in the billion-dollar range, this seems an odd calculation.

Vietnam found the Cam Ranh Bay station useful for information on Chinese movements in the South China Sea. While Russia took some equipment back with them, it is not known how much capability the Vietnamese still have.

There have been a number of reports that the US helped, using SIGINT satellites, Russian fighters to target and shoot down the Chechen leader, Dzhokhar Dudayev in April 1996.

=== Spain ===
Spain operates both a SIGINT ship and a SIGINT aircraft in an apparently strategic function. Its submarines have SIGINT, at least for targeting.

The air component is a 707 variant, modified by Israel and equipped with Israeli and Spanish electronics. As well as an Elta EL/L-8300 SIGINT system, the aircraft has a Tamam Stabilised Long Range Observation System (SLOS) high-resolution TV camera and recording systems. The SLOS is reported to have a range of at least 62 miles (100 km). The aircraft has been reported around the western edge of North Africa, the Western Sahara and the Mediterranean.

Spain has been reported to have acquired an ex-East German AGI, which it may operate in cooperation with its SIGINT aircraft. The vessel concerned is the 1,900 ton renamed Alerta. In East German service, she had extensive antennas and a large radome. Based in Cartagena, the SIGINT work is reportedly by two Israeli companies and a Spanish firm. A different source says that the SIGINT equipment is Russian. A Saturn 35 satellite antenna has been, according to Spanish sources, added.

Its submarines have at least tactical SIGINT. Spanish boats have the domestically produced Indra BLQ-355, which may have been exported. With its participation in the EADS consortium, Spain obtains access to new technologies. Spain appears to be developing a coordinated SIGINT approach using submarine, ship, and aircraft platforms.

=== Sweden ===
In 1942, Swedish SIGINT successes were such that it was split out from the General Staff's intelligence branch and made autonomous. At the end of WWII, it was suggested that of European nations, Sweden's SIGINT was second only to Great Britain's.

Sweden's Defence Radio Institute, while non-aligned, was reported to be cooperating with the other Scandinavian countries in obtaining SIGINT on the Soviet Union and Eastern Europe

=== Switzerland ===
A number of reports suggest Switzerland both has its own SIGINT but may cooperate with ECHELON. In the spring of 2000, Swisscom announced that it was selling its satellite earth stations, in Leuk, Geneva, Basel and Zurich, to a US firm, Verestar. Swisscom announced in spring 2000 that it would withdraw from the satellite industry to "concentrate on its core activities....The Swiss military sees the purchase of the satellite stations by the US as a potential threat to national security, arguing that the infrastructure could be used for spying." Verestar is a major European provider of Internet Exchange Points.

The article suggested Switzerland has independent capability. "Switzerland has been conducting its own satellite project since 1993, dubbed Satos 3. Initiated by security chief Peter Regli, it is similar to the Echelon project, but on a much smaller scale. Regli's successor continues to develop the project with the objective of developing a network capable of dealing with "threats from technology, terrorism and nuclear weapons".

=== United Kingdom ===
The major SIGINT organization of Great Britain is the Government Communications Headquarters (GCHQ). The various military components have tactical SIGINT elements. MI-5, the counterespionage organisation, also has specialised SIGINT capability for detecting receivers as well as illegal transmitters.

Britain is trying to find a balance between the very real "special relationship" with the US and the UKUSA partners, and still having a significant European role. Transnational terrorism, as well as multinational organized crime, have led to increased sharing among domestic security organizations. In the case of Britain, this is the Security Service MI5 with France's DST, Germany's BFV and the other domestic agencies in the so-called Club of Berne.

==== Britain and France ====
Cooperation with France, by any other government, because the multiple intelligence agencies do not coordinate well with each other. There is no equivalent of the British Joint Intelligence Committee (JIC) or US Intelligence Board (USIB). While priorities do come from a national Comité Interministériel du Renseignement, there is no central information and analysis coordination. The particular structure of the French government hurts centralization, because the President and Prime Minister both would want control.

Nevertheless, British and French intelligence, perhaps more on the foreign side, sometimes work closely, as an extension of the relationship formed when the British Special Operations Executive (SOE) helped the French Resistance. The relationship was strengthened when the French President, Mitterrand, ordered the French intelligence services to assist Britain in the Falklands conflict. France helped track an Argentine ship that was thought to be attempting to obtain additional French-made Exocet missiles.

The most important ELINT and radar MASINT cooperation between Britain and France was detailed radar information on the French Exocet anti-shipping missile, which had already sunk HMS Sheffield and threatened other ships. While the Argentines had only five Exocets, each could sink a ship, and they were attempting to obtain more. Mitterrand's analyst disclosed several comments from Mitterrand during the Falklands war, specifically dealing with the British request for detailed information on the Exocet, so electronic countermeasures (ECM) could be planned to misdirect it. Mitterrand, according to his analyst, said, "I had a difference of opinion to settle with the Iron Lady. What an impossible woman, that Thatcher! “With her four nuclear submarines on mission in the southern Atlantic, she threatens to launch the atomic weapon against Argentina — unless I supply her with the secret codes that render deaf and blind the missiles we have sold to the Argentineans. Margaret has given me very precise instructions on the telephone."

Thatcher had already been surprised by an offer of French assistance. Again according to the analyst, Jacques Attali, his former aide, said that Mitterrand called her on the day after the Argentine invasion and told her: "I am with you."

Mitterrand told his analyst "She is furious. She blames me personally for this new Trafalgar . . . I have been forced to yield. She has them now, the [Exocet radar] codes. If our customers find out that the French wreck the weapons they sell, it’s not going to reflect well on our exports."

While the highest levels of government may cooperate, and there is a good working relationship with the French domestic service, DST, there is less mutual aid between GCHQ and the French SIGINT organization in the DGSE. Part of this is that French and British targeting is different, with France focused on the Francophone countries of the world. The French also are suspicious of British ties to the NSA. During the Falklands war and on matters of counterterrorism, there has been effective SIGINT cooperation.

It is not known if Britain will receive information from the French experimental Essaim.

==== Britain and Germany ====
There is HUMINT cooperation between German and British intelligence services.

=== United States ===
The National Security Agency (NSA) is the major SIGINT organization of the US, with other SIGINT activities in other parts of the intelligence community. There is SIGINT capability in several other agencies, often concerned with just one aspect, such as collection or tactical use. US military forces all have tactical SIGINT and COMSEC (Communications Security) units. The director of NSA wears a "second hat" as the director of the Central Security Service, which coordinates the military operations, which may both make use of national resources (i.e., TENCAP, or Tactical Exploitation of National Intelligence Capabilities) or provide data to the strategic analysts elsewhere in the intelligence community. There is a limited cryptanalytic capability, principally aimed at domestic criminals, in the Federal Bureau of Investigation (FBI). CIA has some joint activities with NSA, which may include the covert or clandestine placement of SIGINT sensors.

US doctrine includes a flexible interface between the strategic and tactical, in military operations. Under the TENCAP program, warfighters can benefit from systems intended for the national intelligence level. Under the complementary Tactical Intelligence and Related Activities (TIARA) programs, tactical units acquiring information of interest to the national level can feed it up the chain to the appropriate organizations.

The interaction of the US intelligence community, especially COMINT, for domestic law enforcement and counterterrorism is extremely complex, balancing civil liberties versus security needs. There is no consensus on this balance and the matter is very controversial.

== The SIGINT industry ==
A variety of firms build SIGINT equipment, and the various government agencies typically have strong in-house prototyping. In the US, the major manufacturers are easy enough to find at trade shows such as that of the Armed Forces Communications-Electronics Association (AFCEA), but details are often scanty until there is a meeting at which classified information can be exchanged. Several firms, however, do have a much higher profile.

One challenge, especially in the US where there are many mergers and acquisitions, and in Europe where a consortium model is more common, is keeping track of the names of manufacturers. As one example, the microwave surveillance systems business of Watkins-Johnson, a SIGINT electronics vendor with a long history, was acquired in 1995 by Condor Systems. Watkins-Johnson refocused to make its core business the manufacture of components. Condor Systems, in turn, was acquired by EDO Reconnaissance and Surveillance Systems Inc.(EDO RSS). An actual piece of equipment, however, might still have a Watkins-Johnson label.

=== Boeing ===
A very large aerospace industry and defense industry vendor, Boeing makes many systems, including the 707 platform on which the US E-3 AWACS is built, and the 767 platform for Japan's AWACS. It is building the P-8 replacement for the P-3 maritime patrol aircraft, and has proposed a SIGINT variant. See discussion of this aircraft under SIGINT

=== EADS Consortium ===
European Aeronautic Defence and Space Company EADS N.V. (EADS) is a large European aerospace corporation, formed by the merger on 10 July 2000 of Aérospatiale-Matra of France, Construcciones Aeronáuticas SA (CASA) of Spain, and DaimlerChrysler Aerospace AG (DASA) of Germany. The combined organizations, especially the French and German components, have extensive military electronics experience.

=== Elbit Systems ===
This Israeli firm, with worldwide strategic partners, owns all of the former Israeli military electronics manufacturer, Tadiran. It has US manufacturing operations, which sometimes create US export control restrictions. Elbit is teamed with Thales Group to produce the UK's standard UAV.

=== General Dynamics ===
A diversified US military contractor, it divested itself of aviation lines of business and now concentrates on land and naval systems. General Dynamics C4 Systems, in Scottsdale, AZ, makes SIGINT products including the Army's Prophet ground SIGINT system.

=== GTE ===
GTE Government Systems is now part of General Dynamics. GTE merged its communications operations with Verizon

=== SIGINT Systems ===
SIGINT Systems appears to be a British firm that makes the "HARVESTER family of SIGINT database applications (that) provide unique and cost-effective solutions to a wide range of collection requirements" and has a website that can serve as a basic tutorial on the technical aspects of what SIGINT systems collect.

=== Israel Aerospace Industries ===
Israel Aerospace Industries (IAI) (formerly Israel Aircraft Industries), is the largest defense contractor in Israel. It sells worldwide, although the United States has, on occasion, blocked a sale, which included US technology, to a nation the US considered unfriendly.

Within the context of SIGINT and related ISTAR product is the airborne Phalcon system, often described as an AWACS radar and battle management system, but having significant ELINT capabilities. Based on an Active Electronically Scanned Array (AESA) radar and antenna, the Phalcon fuses data from the radar, but also IFF, COMINT and ELINT sensors. When the supplemental sensors detect an item of interest, the system control computer begins an active search for more information from other on-board and ground-based sensors.

First exhibited in 1993, full Phalcon, other than one on an Israeli 707, has been sold to Chile and India (Ilyushin Il-76 platform), although a sale to the People's Republic of China was blocked by the US. A subset was sold to South Africa, and a miniaturized version will be installed in Israeli Gulfstream G550 SIGINT aircraft. This will include S- and L-band radars, as well as passive sensors.

=== Narus ===
Another firm is Narus, which started as a security vendor for very large telecommunications and Internet service providers (ISPs), has a product called the "NarusInsight Intercept Suite (NIS) enables capture of packet-level, flow-level, and application-level usage information along with complete session packets for forensic analysis, surveillance, or for satisfying regulatory compliance."

Narus' CEO was interviewed about the general subject of cyberwarfare, perhaps an even broader problem than SIGINT. Oslan, when asked to describe cyberwarfare, said "This is my opinion only, but I think that what would constitute an act of war over the Internet would be something that maliciously, directly cripples a country’s ability to function. If somebody brought down our electrical infrastructure and crippled our economy, I think that would be an act of war. How we could treat that, government to government, is a policy question. You are not using guns and bullets anymore. What is the appropriate response as your armies move from physical entities to virtual entities?" If one continued the military metaphor here, the armies, whether physical or virtual, need intelligence.

Large ISPs increasingly believe that "deep packet inspection" is required to protect their internal infrastructure, as well as their customers, from malicious hacking and computer crime. The same type of tools with legitimate ISP security applications also have COMINT interception and analysis capability.

=== Northrop Grumman ===
A major US defense industry player, Northrop Grumman makes a variety of sensors, as well as the Global Hawk UAV, which uses Raytheon SIGINT electronics. The EuroHawk variant of this UAV has SIGINT electronics from EADS.

=== Racal ===
A British company founded in 1950, Racal is now part of Thales Group.

=== Raytheon ===
A major US defense contractor, Raytheon's own materials identify it as the SIGINT contractor for the Global Hawk Unmanned aerial vehicle (UAV). See further discussion of this product under Aircraft Platforms.

=== Swedish-South African-EADS ===
A consortium of Swedish CelsiusTech (formerly Saab Technologies) and Grintek Ewation, the latter a South African partnership with the European EADS consortium. Through their common international trademark Monitoring, Reconnaissance, Counter Measures (MRCM) they field a full range of SIGINT technologies.

=== Thales ===
Thales Group is a French electronics company involved in, among others, defense and security markets. It was earlier called Thomson-CSF, but changed its name after acquiring Racal. Its ownership is split among the Government of France, Alcatel-Lucent, and Dassault Group.

Its joint venture to build the British Watchkeeper WK450 UAV, UAV Tactical Systems, is 51% majority owned by Israeli company Elbit Systems and Thales UK. US participation in Elbit imposes some US export controls.

== See also ==
- Intelligence cycle management
- Signals intelligence in modern history
