= Lourdes SIGINT station =

Soviet spy centre in Cuba

- Cuba

Site information
- Owner: Government of Cuba
- Condition: Partially demolished/converted; scheduled for a reopening

Location
- Location within Cuba
- Coordinates: 22°59′00″N 82°27′47″W

Site history
- Built: 1962
- In use: 1962–2002

Garrison information
- Garrison: (Russia) Russian Intelligence (allegedly) (China) Chinese Intelligence (allegedly)

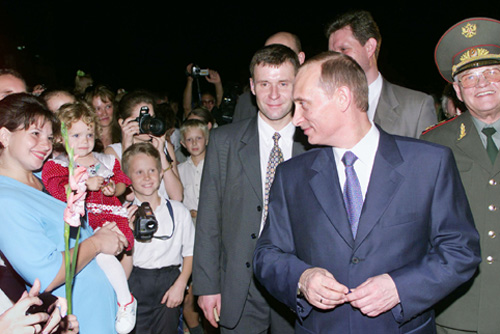
Vladimir Putin, accompanied by Minister of Defense Igor Sergeyev, visits the settlement of homes of families of the employees of the Lourdes SIGINT station in Cuba, 15 December 2000

The Lourdes SIGINT (Signals Intelligence) facility, located near Havana, Cuba, was the largest facility of its kind operated by Soviet and later Russian foreign intelligence services outside of Russia. Located less than 150 km (93 mi) from Key West, the facility covered 73 km^{2} (28 sq mi). Construction began in July 1962.

Lourdes station was able to eavesdrop on the entire US eastern seaboard.

The station purportedly closed in August 2002.

All station facilities were shut down, the buildings were abandoned and later reconstructed to become the University of Information Science.

At its peak during the Cold War over 1,500 KGB, GRU, Cuban DGI, and Eastern Bloc technicians, engineers and intelligence operatives staffed the facility.

The base closed in 2002. Russia had paid Cuba a $200 million annual subsidy from 1962 to 2002.

In July 2014 reports surfaced that Russia and Cuba had agreed to reopen the facility for usage by Russian intelligence. Russia and Cuba following imposition of sanctions on Russia after it annexed the Crimea, according to reports.

== In popular culture ==
- The station was a key plot device in the August 28, 2012 episode of the USA television network series Covert Affairs episode "Loving the Alien".
- The station was briefly mentioned in the April 9, 2017, airing of NCIS: Los Angeles, season 8, episode 20, entitled "From Havana with Love".
- The station is a main location in the book The Chaos Agent, the 13th book in The Gray Man series.
